= De Lisle carbine =

British World War II suppressed rifle

De Lisle commando carbine
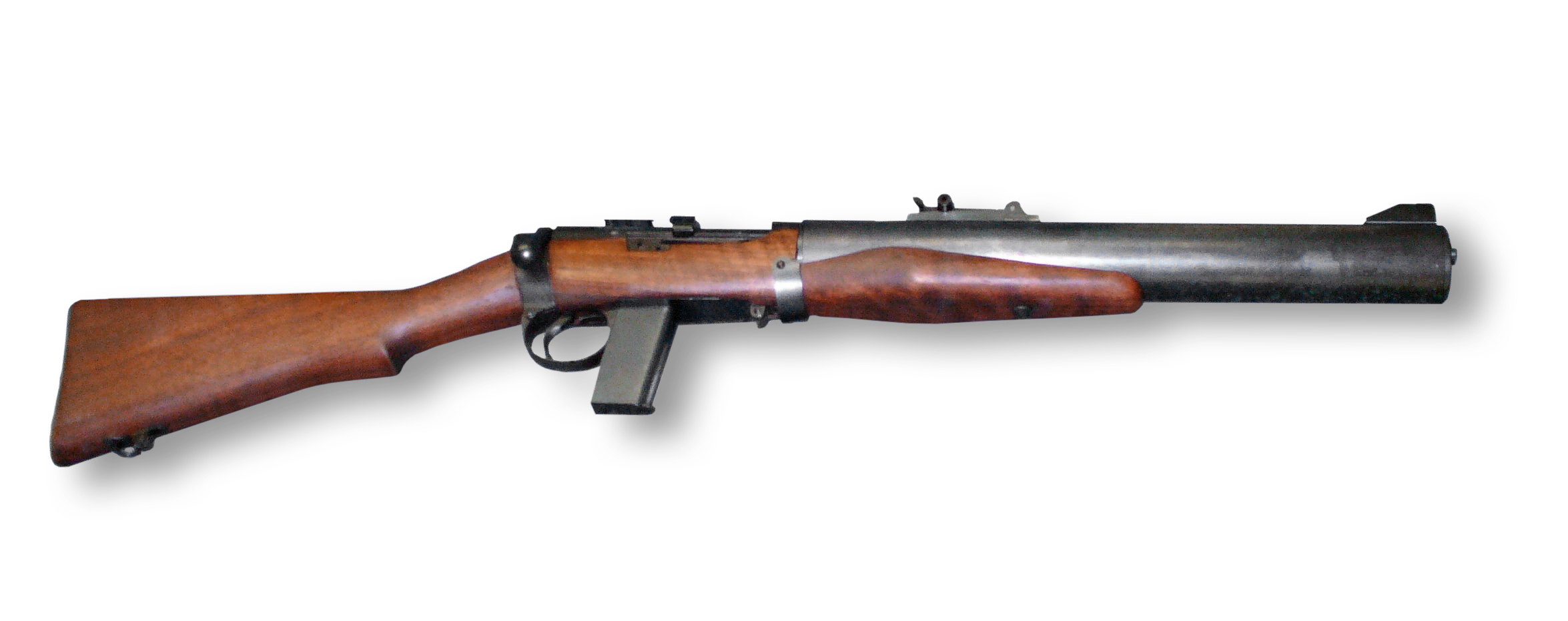
- De Lisle Carbine. Top, with wooden stock. Bottom, with folding stock from a Patchett submachine gun
- Type: Pistol-caliber carbine
- Place of origin: United Kingdom

Service history
- In service: 1943–1965
- Used by: United Kingdom
- Wars: World War II; Korean War; Malayan Emergency

Production history
- Designer: William G. De Lisle
- Designed: 1942
- Manufacturer: Ford Dagenham (17 prototypes); Sterling Armaments Company
- Produced: 1942–1945
- No. built: 129
- Variants: Ford Dagenham Prototypes; Folding stock parachute carbine, only one example produced

Specifications
- Mass: 7 lb 8 oz (3.74 kg), unloaded
- Length: 35.3 in (901.7mm)
- Barrel length: 8.25 inches (210 mm)
- Cartridge: .45 ACP (11.43×23mm)
- Calibre: .45
- Action: Bolt action
- Rate of fire: 15–25 rounds/minute
- Muzzle velocity: about 830 ft/s (250 m/s)
- Effective firing range: 200 yd (185 m)
- Maximum firing range: 400 yd (365 m)
- Feed system: 7 or 11-round detachable magazine (modified)
- Sights: Ford Dagenham: Winchester rifle sight at rear, simple ramp with modified P-14 front sight protector at front. Sterling models: Lanchester Mk I rear sight (later changed to Lanchester Mk I*), windage adjustable front sight. Airborne model: Lanchester Mk I rear sight, windage adjustable front sight

The De Lisle carbine or De Lisle commando carbine was a British firearm used during World War II that was designed with an integrated suppressor. That, combined with its use of subsonic ammunition, made it extremely quiet in action, possibly one of the quietest firearms ever made.

Few were manufactured as their use was limited to specialist military units.

== History ==
The weapon was designed as a private venture by William Godfray de Lisle (known as Godfray), an engineer who worked for the Air Ministry. He made the first prototype in .22 calibre; this he tested by shooting rabbits and other small game for the table, near his home on the Berkshire Downs. In 1943, he approached Major Sir Malcolm Campbell of Combined Operations with his prototype; this was informally tested by firing the weapon into the River Thames from the roof of the New Adelphi building in London. This was chosen to discover if people in the street below heard it firing – they did not. A patent, number 579,168, was filed by De Lisle on May 8.

Combined Operations officials were impressed with the weapon and requested De Lisle produce a 9 mm version. However, this was a failure. A third prototype, using the .45 ACP cartridge that was favoured by de Lisle, was much more successful. Tests of this showed the weapon had acceptable accuracy, produced no visible muzzle flash and was inaudible at a distance of 50 yards (46 m).

Subsequent official firing tests recorded the De Lisle produced 85.5 dB of noise when fired. As a comparison, modern testing on a selection of handguns has shown that they produce 156 to 168 dB when firing without a suppressor, and 117 to 140 dB when firing with one fitted. The De Lisle's quietness was found to be comparable to the British Welrod pistol. However, the Welrod was useful only at very short range and used fabric and rubber components in the suppressor that required replacement after a few shots. The De Lisle was able to fire hundreds of rounds before the suppressor required disassembly for cleaning.

Combined Operations requested a small production run of De Lisle carbines and an initial batch of 17 were hand–made by Ford Dagenham, with Godfray De Lisle himself released from his Air Ministry duties so he could work full-time on the project; this initial batch was immediately put into combat use by the British Commandos. In 1944, the Sterling Armaments Company was given an order for 500 De Lisle carbines, but eventually only produced around 130. The Sterling version differed in a number of details from the earlier, Ford Dagenham model. Two prototypes of a further version, for airborne forces, were made. These had folding stocks, similar to those fitted to Sterling submachine guns.

De Lisle's own .22 prototype was given to the National Army Museum in London, but it was subsequently lost and its present whereabouts are unknown.

=== Combat use ===
During the remainder of World War II, the De Lisle carbine was mainly used by the commandos, although they also saw some use by the Special Operations Executive (SOE). E. Michael Burke, the American former commander of a Jedburgh Team, stated that a De Lisle was used by them to assassinate two senior German officers in 1944.

A number of De Lisles were used during the Burma Campaign to eliminate Japanese sentries. The De Lisle would also be used during the Korean War and the Malayan Emergency.

US Army Special Forces - MACV-SOG used the weapon for many years in the Vietnam War, according to MSG Reinald "Magnet Ass" Pope in a 2024 interview.

It has been claimed the weapon was also used by the Special Air Service during the Northern Irish Troubles.

== Design ==
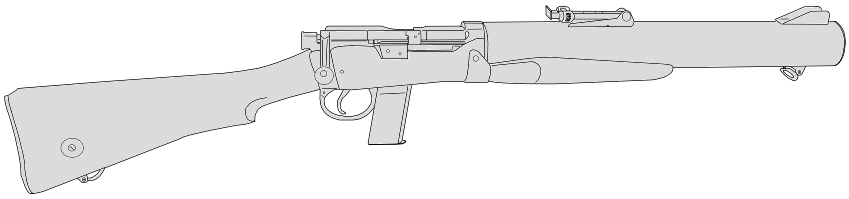
The initial wooden-stocked De Lisle with a fitted silencer

The De Lisle was based on a Short Magazine, Lee–Enfield Mk III* converted to .45 ACP. The receiver was modified, altering the bolt/bolthead, replacing the barrel with a modified Thompson submachine gun barrel (six grooves, RH twist), and using modified magazines from the M1911 pistol. The primary feature of the De Lisle was its extremely effective silencer, which made it very quiet in action. The silencer reduced the sound of the firearm discharging to such a degree that working the bolt (to chamber the next round) produced a louder noise than firing a cartridge.

The .45 ACP cartridge was selected as its muzzle velocity is subsonic for typical barrel lengths; consequently it would both retain its full lethality and not require custom-loaded ammunition to use with a silencer. Most rifle rounds are supersonic, where the bullet generates a "sonic boom" like any other object traveling at supersonic velocities, making them unsuitable for covert purposes. The Thompson gun barrel was "ported" (i.e. drilled with holes) to provide a controlled release of high pressure gas into the silencer that surrounds it before the bullet leaves the barrel. The silencer, 2 inches (5.1 cm) in diameter, went all the way from the back of the barrel to well beyond the muzzle, making up half the overall length of the weapon.

The silencer provided a very large volume to contain the gases produced by firing; this was one of the keys to its effectiveness. The MP5SD and AS Val are among other modern firearms that use the same concept.

The Lee–Enfield bolt was shortened to feed the .45 ACP rounds; the Lee–Enfield's magazine set-up was replaced with a new assembly that held a modified M1911 magazine. The bolt operation offered an advantage in that the shooter could refrain from chambering the next round if absolute silence was required after firing; a semi-automatic weapon would not have offered this option as the cycling of the bolt coupled with rearward escaping propellant gas and the clink of the empty case against any hard surface would produce a noise with each shot. While the carbine was silent, it was not very accurate.

== Clones ==
In 1970, MAC developed a 9 mm carbine called the "Destroyer", inspired by the need for a silenced weapon to be used in special forces missions during the Vietnam War. The first models were based on the Destroyer carbine with five variants made.

=== Modern reproductions ===
The first reported reproduction of the carbine was in 1983 when Gary Delsignore built a small number of De Lisle carbines, fitted with faux suppressors that had a total length of 16 inches.

Century Arms sold No. 4 Enfield rifles that were converted to fire .45 caliber.

A reproduction of the .45 calibre carbine is manufactured by the American company Valkyrie Arms based on original specifications before it went out of business.

Special Interest Arms, for a time, produced limited quantities of a De Lisle replica which incorporated an improved magazine adapter system that allows the use of unmodified M1911 magazines and also fully supports the barrel chamber in the action, later discontinued.

In May 22, 2024, US Armament Manufacturing announced pre-orders for a reproduction of the De Lisle carbine. As of September 2025, production has started.

== Users ==
- United Kingdom: Formerly used by British special forces in WWII and in the Malayan Emergency.
- United States

== See also ==
- Sten—there were silenced versions of the Sten, also used to shoot silently.
- Welrod – Covert pistol
