= Patchett =

Patchett is a surname. Notable people with the surname include:

- Alfred Patchett Warbrick (1860–1940), New Zealand boatbuilder, rugby player and tourist guide
- Ann Patchett (born 1963), American author
- Arthur Patchett Martin (1851–1902), Australian writer
- Dale Patchett (1950–2023), American politician
- George William Patchett, British motorcycle racer and engineer
- Irene Amy Patchett (1887–1989) American anatomist
- Jason Patchett, American politician
- Jean Patchett (1926–2002), American fashion model
- John Patchett (1797–1876), the first person to plant a commercial vineyard and build a commercial wine cellar in the Napa Valley
- Katrina Patchett (born 1986), professional ballroom dancer from Perth, Australia
- Terry Patchett (1940–1996), politician in the United Kingdom
- Wayne Patchett, Australian Paralympic athlete
- William Patchett (died 1843), among the Europeans who died in the Wairau Affray

== See also ==
- Patchett gun or Sterling submachine gun, British submachine gun used in the British Army from 1944 to 1994
- Patchett House, located at Ward Street (NY 17K), on the junction with Factory Street, in Montgomery, New York
- Patch (disambiguation)
- Patchen (disambiguation)
