= Partch =

Surname

Partch is a surname. Notable people with the surname include:

- Harry Partch (1901–1974), American composer, music theorist, and creator of musical instruments, uncle of Virgil Partch
- Virgil Partch (1916–1984), American cartoonist

== See also ==
- Patch (disambiguation)#People
- Pertsch
