= Patch =

Patch, Patches or The Patch may refer to:

== Arts, entertainment and media ==
=== Music ===
- "Patches" (Chairmen of the Board song), 1970, also covered by Clarence Carter
- "Patches" (Dickey Lee song), 1962
- "Patches", a song by Dala from the 2005 album Angels & Thieves
- "Patches", 1919 popular song written by Lee S. Roberts and J. Will Callahan

=== Fictional characters ===
- Patch Johnson, in Days of Our Lives
- Patch Treasurechest, a Lalaloopsy doll and character in the TV series
- Patches (character), in video games by FromSoftware

=== Other uses in arts, entertainment and media ===
- The Patch, a podcast by Rooster Teeth
- Patch Media, an American local news and information platform
- Patch Theatre Company, an Australian theatre company for children

== People ==
- Patch Adams (Hunter Adams, born 1945), American physician and clown
- Alexander Patch (1889–1945), WWII U.S. Army general
- Benjamin Patch (born 1994), American volleyball player
- Harry Patch (1898–2009), WWI British veteran
- Horace Patch (1814–1862), American politician
- John Patch (1781–1861), Nova Scotian fisherman who invented the screw propeller
- Margaret Merwin Patch (née Margaret Stone Merwin; 1894–1987) American arts administrator, and statistician
- Mark Patch (1933–2015), Australian rugby league footballer
- Thomas Patch (1725–1782), English painter, printmaker and art historian
- R. D. Matthews, nicknamed "The Patch", due to an eyepatch he wore

== Places ==
- Augusta Municipal Golf Course, also called The Patch
- Patch, Gwbert, Ceredigion, Wales
- Patch, St. Louis, Missouri, U.S.
- The Patch, Victoria, Australia
- William Clarke Park, Brighton, England, nicknamed The Patch

== Science and technology ==
=== Computing ===
- Patch (computing), data for modifying an existing software resource, and the process of applying the data
- PATCH (HTTP), an HTTP request to make a change
- patch (Unix), command for patching
- Patch, in 3D computer graphics

=== Electronics ===
- Autopatch or phone patch, from radio to telephone
- Patch antenna, with a low profile
- Patch cable, patch cord or patch lead, to connect devices
  - Patch panel

=== Medicine ===
- Eyepatch
- Patch (dermatology), a large skin lesion
- Transdermal patch, a medicated adhesive patch

== Other uses ==
- Patch (firearms), used to wrap a round shot lead ball projectile
- Compulsory figures in figure skating
- Embroidered patch
  - Shoulder sleeve insignia, on US military uniforms
  - Tactical recognition flash, on British military uniforms
- Patch, a term in landscape ecology
- Patch butterflies, several species of Chlosyne
- Pembrokeshire Action To Combat Hardship (PATCH), a British charity
- The Patch (bar), Los Angeles, California, U.S.
- Patch (dog), a Blue Peter pet

== See also ==
- Pach (disambiguation)
- Patch box (disambiguation)
- Patchwork (disambiguation)
- Coal town or coal patch, residences for miners near the coal mine
- Gang patch, insignia of street gangs in New Zealand
- Oil patch, the petroleum industry
- Patch collecting
- Patched, a protein receptor
- Contact patch, the portion of a vehicle's tire in contact with the road
- Swede Patch 2000, a guitar/synthesizer
