= Pach =

Pach may refer to:

== People ==
- Joseph Pach (1928), Canadian violinist
- Walter Pach (1883–1958), American artist, critic, lecturer, and art historian
- Marek Pach (1954), Polish combined skier and ski jumper
- János Pach (1954), Hungarian mathematician and computer scientist

== Other uses ==
- Chuathbaluk Airport, Chuathbaluk, Alaska, U.S.
- Pach Brothers, a photography studio in New York City
