= Tinderbox (disambiguation) =

A tinderbox is a container with the essential tools to make a fire.

Tinderbox may also refer to:

== Art and entertainment ==
=== Music ===
- The Tinderbox (duo), musical duo formed by Steve Ashley and Dave Menday
- Tinderbox (Siouxsie and the Banshees album), a 1986 album by Siouxsie & the Banshees
- Tinderbox (Stiff Little Fingers album), a 1997 album by Stiff Little Fingers
- Tinderbox, a 2008 album by Fred Eaglesmith
- "Tinderbox", a song by Acoustic Alchemy from the 2003 album Radio Contact
- "Tinderbox", a song by Elton John from the 2006 album The Captain & the Kid
- Tinderbox Festival, a Danish music festival in Odense

=== Other arts and entertainment ===
- "The Tinderbox", a 1835 Danish fairy tale written by Hans Christian Andersen
  - The Tinderbox (film), a 1946 Danish animated film of the story
  - The Tinder Box (film), 1959 East German film of the story
- "Tinder Box" (CSI episode), an episode of CSI: Miami
- Tinderbox Theatre Company, a theatre company in Belfast, Northern Ireland

== Other uses ==
- Tinderbox (application software), a personal content management tool developed by Eastgate Systems
- Tinderbox, Tasmania, Australia
- The Tinder Box, a chain of tobacco stores founded in Santa Monica, California in 1928

== See also ==
- Patch box (disambiguation)
