= Patchitt =

Patchitt is a surname. Notable people with the surname include:

- Basil Patchitt (1900–1991), British footballer
- Edwin Patchitt (1808–1888), British cricketer

== See also ==
- Patchett
