= Patchen =

Patchen may refer to:

== People ==
- Patchen Markell (born 1969), academic in political science
- Kenneth Patchen (1911–1972), American poet and novelist
- Miriam Patchen (1914–2000), wife and muse of Kenneth Patchen

== Other uses ==
- Joe Patchen (1889–1917), Standardbred racehorse
- Patchen, California, a ghost town in the Santa Cruz Mountains, California
- Patchen Pass, a mountain pass in the Santa Cruz Mountains of California

== See also ==
- Panchen, in Tibetan Buddhism
