= Comics poetry =

Poetry presented in comic form

Comics poetry or poetry comics is a hybrid creative form that combines aspects of comics and poetry. It draws from the syntax of comics, images, panels, speech balloons, and so on, in order to produce a literary or artistic experience akin to that of traditional poetry.

== History ==
Comics poetry traces its origins to illuminated manuscripts, graphic novels, concrete poetry, and poets who combined images and text such as Kenneth Patchen and Kenneth Koch. In the mid-2000s, a number of artist-poets began publishing independently of one another, referring to what they were doing expressly as comics poetry. According to artist and scholar Tamryn Bennett, "The term comics poetry can be applied to a growing field of works that fall outside of traditional definitions of both comics and poetry. These works include Warren Craghead’s How To Be Everywhere (2007); Matt Madden's Comic Sestina (2004), Michael Farrell's BREAK ME OUCH (2006); as well as a host of comics poetry collections by Bianca Stone, Alexander Rothman, Paul K. Tunis, Gary Sullivan, John Hankiewicz, Anders Nilsen, Derik Badman, Eroyn Franklin, Franklin Einspruch, Sommer Browning, Kimball Anderson, Mohit Trendster, Kevin Czapiewski, Malcy Duff and Julie Delporte, among others." In February 2014, Jessy Randall guest-edited a special comics poetry issue of the literary magazine Snakeskin, with contributors including Natalie Dupille and David Lasky.

== Terminology ==
Use of the terms "comics poetry" and "poetry comics" is widespread among its practitioners. Alexander Rothman, editor-in-chief of Ink Brick, has written, "I call the work that I make and publish 'comics poetry.' ...at the end of the day, more than any other practitioner, a poet is just dealing with words.... Words aren’t necessary for comics, but of course they’re there to use. Panels aren’t necessary, but they’re also there to use. Where the poet’s toolbox contains every imaginable arrangement or manipulation of words, the cartoonist’s holds analogs for the visual elements of the page."

Chrissy Williams, editor of Over the Line: An Introduction to Poetry Comics, said in an interview, "I generally say 'poetry comic' by the way, not to give any priority to the poetry, but rather to avoid any confusion with 'comic poems,' which are already their own very different hilarious genre of poem. ... the genre needs to be defined fundamentally as an inextricable combination of both comics and poetry, neither of which should be dispensable. In the best poetry comics, I believe, the piece would fail utterly (or at best be horrifically diminished) if you removed either the poetry or the artwork from the composition."

Tamryn Bennet has written, "Like [comics poet] Derik Badman, I use the term 'comics poetry', as opposed to 'graphic poetry', 'comics-as-poetry', or 'poetry comics', as it refers to the origins of the form rather than the sequential narratives of graphic novels. As Badman explains, 'Comics poetry isn't poetry as text with comics images; it's the whole comic as poetry. The images, the words, the structure, the rhythm, the page, all of it is used together to create the poetry, to create comics in a poetic register.'"

"Comics poetry" can be used to differentiate the genre from written poems later interpreted in comics form, such as the work of Dave Morice, which is also called "poetry comics."

== Comics poetry publications ==
- Comics as Poetry. Edited by Franklin Einspruch. Boston: New Modern Press, 2012. Anthology including Kimball Anderson, Derik Badman, Warren Craghead, Julie Delporte, Oliver East, Franklin Einspruch, Jason Overby, and Paul K. Tunis, with foreword by William Corbett, ISBN 978-0-9883933-1-8.
- Over the Line: An Introduction to Poetry Comics. Edited by Chrissy Williams and Tom Humberstone. London: Sidekick Books, 2016.
- Kavya Comics (Poetic Comics) Series. Edited by Mohit Trendster. Meerut: Freelance talents, 2010-Present. Contributors: Vyom Dayal, Harendra Saini, Manabendra Majumder, Yash Thakur, Husain Zamin, Youdhveer Singh, Shahab Khan, Abhilash Panda, Jyoti Singh, Pankaj Deore, Deepjoy Subba, Ravi Shankar, Amit Albert, Vishnu Madhav, Soumendra Majumder, and Anuj Kumar.
- Ink Brick: A Journal of Comics Poetry. Edited by Alexander Rothman, Paul K. Tunis, and Alexey Sokolin. Contributors have included Vidhu Aggarwal, Louise Aleksiejew, Kurt Ankeny, Kimball Anderson, Nicky Arscott, Colleen Louise Barry, Jordan Beaulieu, Alexandra Beguez, Alyssa Berg, Catherine Bresner, William Cardini, Sabin Cauldron, Angel Chen, Aaron Cockle, Letisia Cruz, Anthony Cudahy, Allie Doersch, Maëlle Doliveux, Franklin Einspruch, Shawn Eisenach, Glynnis Fawkes, Hayley Fiddler, Winnie T. Frick, Mike Getsiv, John Hankiewicz, Dina Hardy, CB Hart, Jason Hart, Isuri Merenchi Hewage, Matt Huynh, Gary Jackson, Eva Jaroňová, Keren Katz, Simone Kearney, Anna Krztoń, Nicolas Labarre, Mark Laliberte, David Lasky, Kate Laster, Laurel Lynn Leake, Aurelién Leif, Courtney Loberg, Michel Losier, Matt Madden, Maxine Marie, Antoine Medes, Simon Moreton, T. Motley, Laurence Musgrove, Myra Musgrove, L. Nichols, Douglas Noble, M. A. Noreña, Thilini Perera, Summer Pierre, Jesse Reklaw, John Robbins, James Romberger, Ellis Rosen, Sam Ross, Alexander Rothman, Samplerman, Kate Schneider, Heather Simon, Alexey Sokolin, Bishakh Som, Sasha Steinberg, Bianca Stone, Gary Sullivan, John Swogger, Deshan Tennekoon, Paul K. Tunis, Marguerite Van Cook, David Willet, Chrissy Williams, Gabriel Zacuto, and Jenny Zervakis.
