= Kenneth Patchen =

American poet and novelist (1911-1972)

- Patchen, c. 1952
- Born: December 13, 1911; Niles, Ohio, U.S.
- Died: January 8, 1972 (aged 60); Palo Alto, California, U.S.
- Spouse: Miriam Patchen
- Writing career
- Genre: American poetry
- Notable work: I Feel Drunk All the Time
- Website: Official website

Kenneth Patchen (December 13, 1911 – January 8, 1972) was an American poet and novelist. He experimented with different forms of writing and incorporated painting, drawing, and jazz music into his works, which have been compared with those of William Blake and Walt Whitman.

Patchen's biographer wrote that he "developed in his fabulous fables, love poems, and picture poems a deep yet modern mythology that conveys a sense of compassionate wonder amidst the world's violence." Along with his friend and peer Kenneth Rexroth, he was a central influence on the San Francisco Renaissance and the Beat Generation.

== Early years ==
=== Background ===
Patchen was born in Niles, Ohio. His father, Wayne, worked in the nearby steel mills of Youngstown, which Patchen would reference in his poems "The Orange Bears" and "May I Ask You a Question, Mr. Youngstown Sheet & Tube?" Patchen kept a diary from the age of twelve and read Dante, Homer, Burns, Shakespeare, and Melville.

I remember you would put daisies
On the windowsill at night and in
The morning they'd be so covered with soot
You couldn't tell what they were anymore.

— from "The Orange Bears",
Red Wine and Yellow Hair (1949)

His family included his mother Eva, his sisters Ruth, Magel, Eunice, and Kathleen, and his brother Hugh. In 1926, while Patchen was still a teenager, his younger sister Kathleen was struck and killed by an automobile. Her death deeply affected him and he would later pay tribute to her in his 1948 poem "In Memory of Kathleen."

Patchen first began to develop his interest in literature and poetry while he was in high school, and the New York Times published his first poem while he was still in college. He attended Alexander Meiklejohn's Experimental College (which was part of the University of Wisconsin), in Madison, Wisconsin, for one year, starting in 1929. Patchen had a football scholarship there but had to drop out when he injured his back. After leaving school, Patchen travelled across the country, taking itinerant jobs in such places as Arkansas, Louisiana, and Georgia.

=== Marriage ===
Next, Patchen moved to the East Coast, where he lived in New York City and Boston. While in Boston, in 1933, he met Miriam Oikemus at a friend's Christmas party. At the time, Miriam was a freshman at Massachusetts State College in Amherst. The two kept in touch, and Patchen started sending her the first of many love poems. They soon fell in love and decided to get married. First Patchen took her to meet his parents in Youngstown. They were married on June 28, 1934, in nearby Sharon, Pennsylvania.

During the 1930s the couple moved frequently between New York City's Greenwich Village and California, as Patchen struggled to make a living as a writer. Despite his constant struggle, his strong relationship with Miriam supported him and would continue to support him through the hardships that plagued him for most of his adult life. The couple moved to a cottage in Old Lyme, Connecticut, in 1947. In 1951, a few years after befriending the West Coast poet Kenneth Rexroth, the Patchens moved to the West Coast, living first in San Francisco and then moving to Palo Alto in 1957.

=== Health problems ===
In 1937 Patchen suffered a permanent spinal injury, which was to give him pain, to varying degrees, for the rest of his life and which required multiple surgical procedures. In a letter to a friend from 1960, Patchen explained, "In 1956 a spinal fusion [operation] (second of two operations) gave me relief and mobility (& for the first time I was able to go about giving readings, and so on."

By this point, he and his wife had moved from San Francisco to Palo Alto to be closer to the Palo Alto Clinic, where both were receiving treatment. Then, in 1959, Patchen noted in the letter quoted above that another surgery at the Presbyterian Medical Center of San Francisco ended in disaster. He wrote, "During [a] surgical procedure for my throat, and while under complete anesthesia, I suffered another slipped disc." Though he was heavily sedated during the procedure, Patchen suspected that he had been dropped at some point; in any event he was in considerably more pain afterward, and disabled for the rest of his life. In 1963, he sued his surgeon for medical malpractice and lost.

Around this time, Jim Morrison paid for the publication of the Mt. Alverno Review, a poetry anthology edited by his friend, Michael C. Ford, to help Patchen with medical expenses.

=== Politics ===
Throughout his life Patchen was a fervent pacifist, as he made clear in much of his work. He was strongly opposed to the involvement of the United States in World War II. In his own words, "I speak for a generation born in one war and doomed to die in another." This controversial view, coupled with his physical immobilization, may have prevented wider recognition or success beyond what some consider a "cult" following.

=== Final years ===
Patchen lived out the final years of his life with his wife in their modest home on 2340 Sierra Court, in Palo Alto, where Patchen created many of his distinctive painted poems, produced while confined to his bed after his disastrous 1959 surgery inadvertently damaged his spine. He died in Palo Alto, on January 8, 1972. His wife, Miriam, died in March 2000, also in Palo Alto.

== Career ==
=== Writing ===
Patchen's first book of poetry, Before the Brave, was published by Random House in 1936. His earliest collections of poetry were his most political and led to his being championed, in the 1930s, as a "proletariat poet". This description, which Patchen rejected, never stuck, since his work varied widely in subject, style and form. As his career progressed, he continued to push himself into more and more experimental styles and forms, developing, along with writers such as Langston Hughes and Kenneth Rexroth, what came to be known as jazz poetry. He also experimented with his childlike "painted poems," many of which were published posthumously in the 1984 collection What Shall We Do Without Us.

After the appearance of his first book, he and Miriam traveled to the Southwest and then moved to Hollywood in 1938, where he tried, unsuccessfully, writing film scripts and worked for the WPA. His next book of poems, First Will and Testament, drew the attention of James Laughlin, who was then launching New Directions Publishing as a student at Harvard. Laughlin's decision to publish Patchen's work started a relationship that would last for the remainder of both men's careers. For a short time, in 1939, Patchen even took an office job working for New Directions. In addition to their professional relationship, Patchen and Laughlin also became good friends.

The lions of fire
Shall have their hunting in this black land

Their teeth shall tear at your soft throats
Their claws kill

O the lions of fire shall awake
And the valleys steam with their fury
…
Because you have turned your faces from God
Because you have spread your filth everywhere.

— from "The Lions of Fire Shall Have Their Hunting"
The Teeth of the Lion (1942)

Patchen pioneered the "drawing-and-poem form" as well as the painting-and-poem form and produced over a thousand "painted books", special copies of his own works with original paintings on the covers. His many hundreds of drawings and paintings have been described as being reminiscent of those of Blake and Klee. During the course of a long and varied career, he also tried his hand at writing experimental novels, such as The Journal of Albion Moonlight and The Memoirs of a Shy Pornographer, and the radio play The City Wears a Slouch Hat. Patchen's Collected Poems was first published in 1969, just a few years before his death.

=== Peers ===
One of Patchen's biggest literary supporters was the novelist Henry Miller, who wrote a long essay on Patchen, entitled Patchen: Man of Anger and Light, in 1946. In this essay, Miller wrote, "Patchen's pacifism is closely tied to what he sees as the loss of innocence in society, the corrupted human spirit, and is often expressed with animals. Such is the case with the forbidding 'The Lions of Fire Shall Have Their Hunting.'" Patchen also had a close, lifelong friendship with the poet E.E. Cummings, which began when they were both living in Greenwich Village in the 1940s. Patchen was also a close peer of the West Coast poet Kenneth Rexroth, who shared Patchen's antiwar radicalism and his interest in combining poetry readings with jazz accompaniment. The two poets began a correspondence in the late 1940s and continued it in the 1950s. Rexroth encouraged the Patchens to move to San Francisco in the early 1950s.

=== Influence ===
In the 1950s, Patchen became a major influence on the younger Beat poets, including Allen Ginsberg and Lawrence Ferlinghetti. Miriam Patchen recalled some of these young poets, including Philip Lamantia, Gary Snyder, and Michael McClure, visiting the Patchens' home in San Francisco to pay their respects. However, once the Beats' popularity grew, Patchen disliked being associated with them and was highly critical of their glorification of drug use and what he perceived to be a strong desire for media attention and fame. Patchen referred to "Ginsberg and Co." and the media hype surrounding them as a "freak show."

=== Awards ===
In 1936, soon after the release of his first book, Patchen was awarded a Guggenheim Fellowship. In 1944, he won the Ohioana Award for his book Cloth of the Tempest. He received the Shelley Memorial Award in 1954. He received a $10,000 grant for his contribution to American literature from the National Foundation on the Arts and Humanities in 1967.

== Musical collaborations and recordings ==
In 1942 Patchen collaborated with the composer John Cage on the radio play The City Wears a Slouch Hat. In the 1950s Patchen collaborated with the jazz bassist and composer Charles Mingus, reading his poetry with Mingus' group, but no recordings of the collaboration are known to exist.

In the late 1950s Moe Asch of Folkways Records recorded Patchen reading his poetry and excerpts from one of his novels. These recordings were released as Kenneth Patchen Reads with Jazz in Canada (1959), Selected Poems of Kenneth Patchen (1960), Kenneth Patchen Reads His Love Poems (1961), and The Journal of Albion Moonlight (1972). Kenneth Patchen Reads with Jazz in Canada (1959) was recorded in Vancouver the same week as a live performance for CBC Radio. The original record included a mimeographed pamphlet featuring poems and credits for the jazz group who played on the record, the Allan Neil Quartet. It was re-released on CD by Locust Music in 2004.

In 1964–65, the English composer David Bedford set an extract from Patchen's 1948 poem "In Memory of Kathleen" to classical music for the piece A Dream of the Lost Seven Stars.

In November 2004 the Peter Brötzmann Chicago Tentet presented A Homage to Kenneth Patchen at the Chicago Humanities Festival with Mike Pearson reading from The Collected Poems of Kenneth Patchen. A recording was released on the German jazzwerkstatt label entitled Be Music, Night in 2006. Musicians in the performance included Peter Brötzmann (clarinets, alto and tenor saxes), Mats Gustafsson (baritone sax, bass clarinet), Ken Vandermark (baritone sax, clarinet), Joe McPhee (trumpet, alto sax), Jeb Bishop (trombone), Fred Lonberg-Holm (cello), Kent Kessler (bass) and Paal Nilssen-Love and Michael Zerang (drums). In 1984 Brötzmann had recorded a solo dedication to Patchen for FMP titled 14 Love Poems, a collection of short unaccompanied reed pieces that mirror textures and cadences found in the poet's love poems.

On January 21, 2008, El Records released the record Rebel Poets in America, which included poetry readings with jazz accompaniment by both Patchen and Lawrence Ferlinghetti, including such Patchen classics as "The Murder of Two Men by a Young Kid Wearing Lemon Colored Gloves" and "I Went to the City." Patchen made these recordings in collaboration with the musician Allyn Ferguson, who composed and arranged jazz accompaniment for each poem and also led the jazz ensemble.

In October 2011 the Claudia Quintet, with guest vocalists Kurt Elling and Theo Bleckmann, released an album on Cuneiform Records of Patchen's poetry set to music written by Claudia leader John Hollenbeck.

== Critical response ==
Patchen's work has received little attention from academic critics. However, a few scholars have published critical books on Patchen, including Raymond Nelson, Herbert P. Hogue, and Larry R. Smith. Also, a collection of essays on Patchen's work was edited by Richard Morgan for the book Kenneth Patchen: A Collection of Essays (1977).

Notable book reviews provide a reasonably accurate gauge of the public response to Patchen's work when it was initially published. For instance, Patchen biographer Larry Smith notes that "[the] initial reception to Patchen's First Will & Testament was positive and strong." Smith notes that a reviewer from the New Republic compared the book to T. S. Eliot's The Waste Land. The book was also praised in reviews by Louis Untermeyer and John Peale Bishop. However, it received a notably negative review by Delmore Schwartz in Partisan Review. Following this first negative review, Schwartz would remain one of Patchen's fiercest critics.

In response to Patchen's novel The Journal of Albion Moonlight (1941), prior to its publication, Henry Miller praised the work in the long essay Patchen: Man of Anger and Light, which was published in book form in 1946. Also prior to the book's publication, Delmore Schwartz read the manuscript and claimed to be so offended by its controversial antiwar stance that he persuaded Patchen's publisher, New Directions, against publishing it. This forced Patchen to self-publish the book by subscription. Post-publication, the book's supporters included Miller, Robert Duncan, and James Laughlin; its detractors included Schwartz, Edmund Wilson, and Anaïs Nin. Despite receiving a favorable review from William Carlos Williams in 1942, the novel's highly experimental style, limited release, and antiwar stance would guarantee it a very limited audience.

In 1943, Patchen's Cloth of the Tempest received largely negative reviews. One reviewer even accused Patchen of being "naive," a common criticism aimed at his work, particularly regarding his fervent pacifist beliefs.

In the 1950s, Patchen received praise from the jazz critic Ralph Gleason for his jazz-poetry readings with the Chamber Jazz Sextet at the Blackhawk Club in San Francisco. Gleason wrote, "I think [Patchen's reading] technique presents the possibilities of an entire new medium of expression―a combination of jazz and poetry that would take nothing away from either form but would create something entirely new." When Patchen recorded his jazz-poetry readings, one of the resulting albums drew praise from the poet John Ciardi, who wrote that "Patchen's poetry is in many ways a natural for jazz accompaniment. Its subject and its tone are close to those of jazz."

In 1958, Patchen's Selected Poems and his book When We Were Here Together received significant praise from the reviewer Frederick Eckman in Poetry magazine. Eckman favorably compared Patchen's work to that of the poet William Blake and singled out the poems "Street Corner College," "Do the Dead Know What Time It Is?," "The Origin of Baseball," "Fog," and "The Character of Love Seen As a Search for the Lost" as some of Patchen's best pieces. He called When We Were Here Together "a beautiful book, inside and out." However, in the very same issue of Poetry, the reviewer Robert Beum wrote a brief, negative review of Patchen's book Hurrah for Anything, calling it dull and clichéd.

Patchen's most important volume, The Collected Poems of Kenneth Patchen, first published in 1968, received largely positive reviews. A reviewer for the New York Times called the book "a remarkable volume" and compared Patchen's work to that of Walt Whitman, Hart Crane, and D. H. Lawrence and also compared it to the Bible. In another review, the poet David Meltzer called Patchen "one of America's great poet-prophets" and called his body of work "visionary art for our time and for Eternity." Like the Times reviewer, Meltzer also compared Patchen's work to that of Walt Whitman and to the Bible and also to the writing of William Blake.

== Legacy ==
Although he did not achieve widespread fame during his lifetime, a small but dedicated following of fans and scholars continue to celebrate Patchen's art. The University of California, Santa Cruz, hosts an archive of his work, entitled "Patchenobilia," and many bookstores around the San Francisco Bay Area, Patchen's final home, continue to host jazz and poetry events which include his works.

On Jimmy Buffett's 1973 album A White Sport Coat and A Pink Crustacean, the single "Death of An Unpopular Poet" is claimed by Buffett to have been inspired by Patchen and fellow poet Richard Farina.

Between 1987 and 1991 there were Kenneth Patchen Festivals, celebrating his work, in Warren, Ohio, which encompasses the town of Niles, where Patchen was born and grew up. These festivals were sponsored by the Trumbull Art Gallery in collaboration with the University of California, Santa Cruz. The little street where he lived as a child was renamed Patchen Avenue by the town of Niles.

In 2007, Gallery 324 in the Galleria at Erieview in downtown Cleveland, Ohio, held a Kenneth Patchen Festival reception on April 13. Featured were Larry Smith of Bottom Dog Press, Doug Manson (SUNY, Buffalo) editor of Celery Flute Player (a Kenneth Patchen newsletter), numerous colorful Kenneth Patchen silkscreens on loan from the Trumbull Art Guild in Warren, and Douglas Paisley's paintings of The Journal of Albion Moonlight with text. The following day, at the same gallery M.L. Liebler and the Magic Poetry Band from Detroit accompanied readings by poets Chris Franke, Jim Lang, and others. Later that night, the festival moved uptown to The Barking Spider Tavern in the University Circle area for poetry readings accompanied by the Cleveland band The John Richmond All-Stars. In 2011, Kelly's Cove Press published Kenneth Patchen: A Centennial Selection, edited by Patchen's friend Jonathan Clark, in celebration of the centenary of Patchen's birth.

In April 2012, Allen Frost published the Selected Correspondence of Kenneth Patchen, which includes letters between Patchen and James Laughlin, Lawrence Ferlinghetti, Henry Miller, Amos Wilder, Dylan Thomas, Thomas Wolfe and E.E. Cummings.

A full-color collection of Patchen's photos and art, An Astonished Eye: The Art of Kenneth Patchen, by Jonathan Clark, was published by Artichoke Press and the University of Rochester Library in 2014.

== Works ==
Sources:

- Before the Brave (Random House, 1936)
- First Will and Testament (Norfolk, Connecticut: New Directions, 1939), in an edition of 800 copies
- The Journal of Albion Moonlight (self-published, 1941; New Directions, 1961)
- The Dark Kingdom (New York: Harriss & Givens, 1942)
- The Teeth of the Lion (New Directions, 1942)
- Cloth of the Tempest (Harper and Brothers, 1943)
- The Memoirs of a Shy Pornographer (New Directions, 1945)
- An Astonished Eye Looks Out of the Air (Untide Press, 1945)
- Outlaw of the Lowest Planet (London: Grey Walls Press, 1946, selections from: "First Will and Testament", "The Dark Kingdom", "The Teeth of the Lion", "Cloth of the Tempest")
- The Selected Poems of Kenneth Patchen (New Directions, 1946)
- Sleepers Awake (New York: Padell Book, 1946)
- Panels for the Walls of Heaven (Berkeley, California, Bern Porter/Gillick Press, 1946)
- Pictures of Life and Death (New York: Padell Book, 1946)
- They Keep Riding Down All the Time (New York: Padell Book, 1946)
- To Say If You Love Someone (Decker Press, 1947)
- CCCLXXIV Poems (New York: Padell Book, 1948)
- Red Wine and Yellow Hair (New Directions, 1949)
- Fables and Other Little Tales (Karlsruhe Baden: Jonathan Williams, 1953)
- Poems of Humor and Protest (San Francisco: City Lights Books, 1954)
- The Famous Boating Party (New Directions, 1954)
- Hurrah for Anything (New Directions, 1957)
- When We Were Here Together (New Directions, 1957)
- Selected Poems (New Directions, 1957)
- Poemscapes (Jonathan Williams, 1958)
- Doubleheader (New Directions, 1958, includes: "Hurrah for Anything","Poemscapes", "Letter to God")
- The Love Poems of Kenneth Patchen (San Francisco: City Lights Books, 1960)
- Because It Is (New Directions, 1960)
- Hallelujah Anyway (New Directions) 1966
- But Even So (picture poems) (New Directions, 1968)
- Selected Poems (London: Jonathan Cape, 1968)
- Collected Poems (New Directions) 1969
- Aflame and Afun of Walking Faces (New Directions, 1970)
- Wonderings (New Directions, 1971)
- In Quest of Candlelighters (New Directions, 1972, includes: "Panels for the Walls of Heaven", "They Keep Riding Down All the Time", "Bury Them in God" [short story], "Angel-Carver Blues [early section from "Sleepers Awake"])
- Nothing Has Changed (Artichoke Press, 1975)
- The Argument of Innocence, (Oakland California: Scrimshaw Press, 1976)
- Patchen's Lost Plays (Santa Barbara, California: Capra Press, 1977)
- Still Another Pelican in the Breadbox, (Youngstown, Ohio: Pig Iron Press, 1980)
- What Shall We Do Without Us (picture poems) (San Francisco, California: Sierra Club Books, 1984)
- Awash with Roses: Collected Love Poems of Kenneth Patchen (Huron, Ohio: Bottom Dog Press, 1999)
- We Meet (New Directions, 2008)
- The Walking-Away World (New Directions, 2008)
- Kenneth Patchen: A Centennial Selection, Jonathan Clark (ed.) (Kelly's Cove Press, 2011)
- Selected Correspondence of Kenneth Patchen, Allen Frost (ed.) (Huron, Ohio: Bottom Dog Press, 2012)

== Discography ==
- Kenneth Patchen Reads His Poetry With The Chamber Jazz Sextet, 1957, Cadence Records CLP-3004
- Selected Poems of Kenneth Patchen: Read by the Author, 1959, Folkways Records FW09717 (cover artwork by Jackson Pollock)
- Kenneth Patchen Reads with Jazz in Canada – with the Alan Neil Quartet, 1959, Folkways Records FW09718
- Kenneth Patchen Reads His Love Poems, 1961, Folkways Records FW09719
- The Journal of Albion Moonlight, 1972, Folkways Records FW09716
- Rebel Poets of America, 2008, with Lawrence Ferlinghetti, El Records/Cherry Red Records (recorded 1957)

== See also ==
- Comics poetry
