= George William Patchett =

British motorcycle racer

George Patchett
- Occupations: Racer and specialist motorcycle designer
- Known for: Motorcycle racing and world records

George William Patchett (23 December 1901 - before 31 December 1974) was a English motorcycle racer and engineer.

== Career ==
In his early career, Patchett competed as a motorcycle racer for motorcycle manufacturers such as Brough Superior, McEvoy and the Belgian arms company FN. At Pendine, Wales, he won the Welsh TT in 1925 and the Welsh TT sidecar in 1927 on Brough machines.

In 1930, Patchett was recruited by the Czech arms manufacturer František Janeček, founder of the JAWA motorcycle company, to work as an engineer and a racer. Due to the economic recession Janeček wanted to build a cheaper motorcycle than their 500cc model. Patchett's contacts with the Villiers company enabled a new Jawa 175 Villiers to be designed around the Villiers 175cc two-stroke engine which proved very popular.

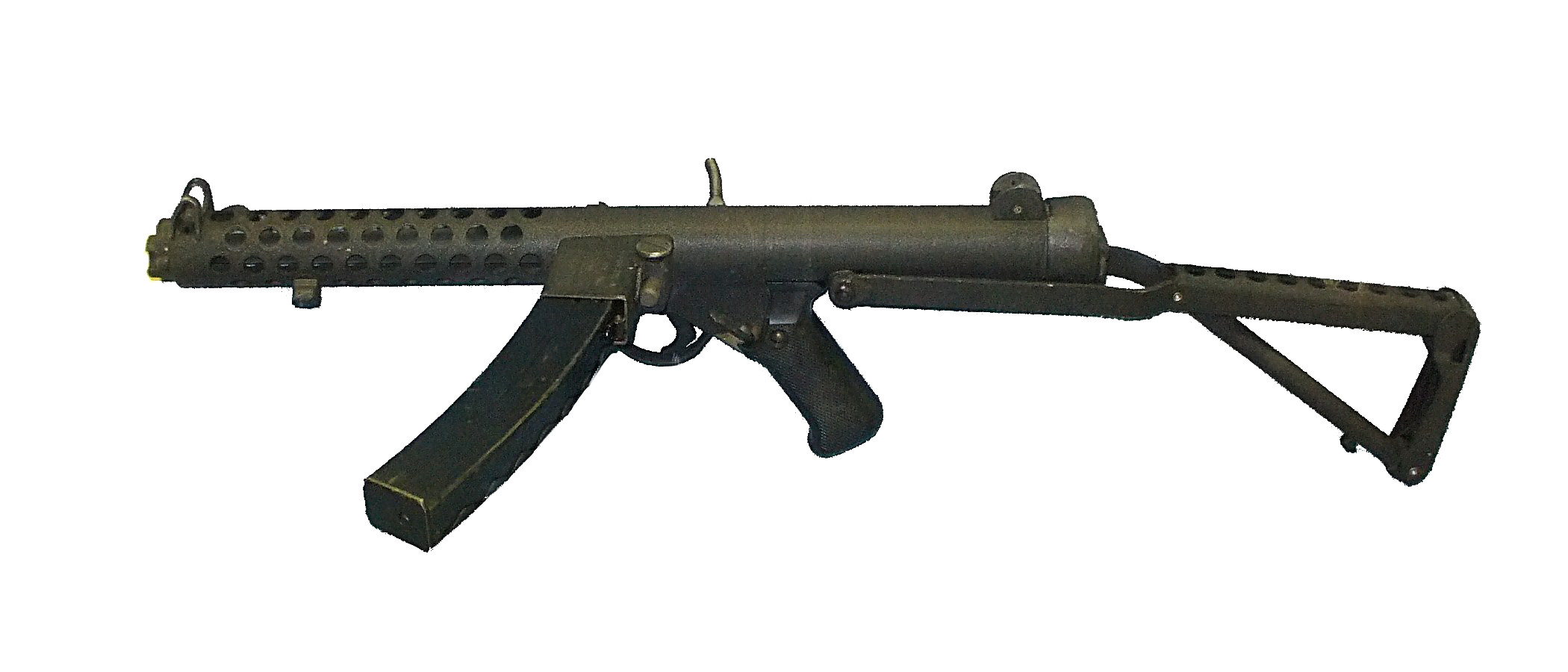
9mm Sterling submachine gun Mark IV

Patchett was an amateur photographer and took photos and films of the Nazi Occupation of Czechoslovakia on 15 March 1939. At the outbreak of World War II, Patchett returned to England and started work under the auto-engineer George Lanchester at the Sterling Armaments Company in Dagenham, Essex, helping to gear up manufacture of the Lanchester sub-machine gun. On his way out of Prague he managed to throw prototype samples of Janeček's new anti-tank device over the wall of the British Embassy.

By 1942, Patchett was leading a design team to design a new sub-machine gun to the army's specification which was referred to as the "Patchett Machine Carbine". After successfully taking part in extensive army trials in the mid to late 1940s the Sterling submachine gun was adopted by the British Army to replace the Sten gun and known by them as the "9mm Sterling sub-machine gun L2A1". A modified version, the L2A3, was the very popular Sterling Mk IV which saw service until the 1990s.

In 1966, the High Court awarded Patchett £116,975 (£1.9 million as of 2025) for the British government's use of the machine gun he patented. The same amount was awarded to Sterling, which had sued for half a million pounds. Mr. Justice Lloyd-Jacob referred to Patchett as "a distinguished inventor and valued designer" in making the award.
