= Franklin Einspruch =

American artist and writer

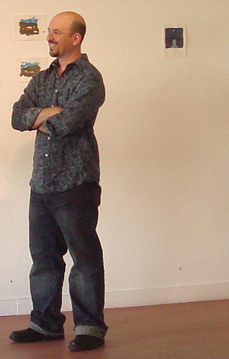
- Einspruch in 2008
- Born: 1968 (age 57–58); Dallas, Texas, U.S.
- Known for: Painting, drawing, writing
- Movement: Modernism

Franklin Einspruch is an American artist and writer based in Hillsborough, New Hampshire.

== Biography ==
Franklin Einspruch was born in Dallas, Texas. Einspruch completed a Bachelor of Fine Arts at the Rhode Island School of Design, and a Master of Fine Arts at the University of Miami, where he studied with Walter Darby Bannard. Einspruch is a member of the United States chapter of the International Association of Art Critics.

== Work ==
Franklin Einspruch has been an artist in residence at the Sam & Adele Golden Foundation for the Arts, the Heliker-LaHotan Foundation, the Morris Graves Foundation, and the Aegean Center for the Fine Arts. The critic Don Wilkinson has described his work as "handsome expressionist painting, grounded in reality, yet veering toward the abstract."

Einspruch's art criticism and other writing has appeared in publications including The New Criterion, The Spectator, The New York Sun, The Miami New Times, Art Critical, City Journal, The Arts Fuse, and Art in America. His writing has been cited in The New York Times Magazine and The Washington Post.

Einspruch's blog, Artblog.net, began in 2003 and is one of the longest-running blogs about visual art. He edits the Walter Darby Bannard Archive and edited a compilation of Bannard's art advice, Aphorisms for Artists which was published in 2022 by Letter16 Press.

An interview with Einspruch was featured on the .art domain website as an early adopter of that top-level domain.

== Comics Poetry ==
Einspruch has been involved in comics poetry since the form emerged in the mid-2000s, when he began posting comics poems online at The Moon Fell On Me. He edited and published the first anthology of comics poetry, Comics as Poetry, in 2012. In 2018 he was chosen to be the Fulbright/Q21-MuseumsQuartier Artist-in-Residence for the 2018-19 award year. His project as a Fulbright scholar was a cycle of comics poems about Vienna, titled (and published at) Regarding Th.at. Einspruch published a work of comics poetry in 2018 titled Cloud on a Mountain.
