= Larry R. Smith =

Larry R. Smith is a poet, fiction writer, literary biographer, translator, essayist and reviewer.

== Background ==
Smith was born in Mingo Junction, Ohio in 1943 and graduated from Mingo High School in 1961, Muskingum College in 1965, then on to Kent State University in Ohio for a masters and doctorate in American and Contemporary World Literature. His thesis work was on Sherwood Anderson and dissertation on Kenneth Patchen, fellow Ohio writers. He has taught at Bowling Green State University's Firelands College since 1970. The author has received an Ohio Arts Council Writing Fellowship and an Ohioana Citation for his contribution to poetry in Ohio. He also has received a National Endowment for the Humanities summer grant and a Fulbright Teaching Lectureship to Italy.

Smith is married to Ann Smith also of Mingo Junction, a professor of nursing at the Medical College of Ohio. Together with her and others they founded Converging Paths Meditation Center in Sandusky, Ohio. Smith is the director of The Firelands Writing Center and of Bottom Dog Press.

== Books ==
- Lake Winds: Poems. Bottom Dog Press 2014
- Each Moment All. March Street Press/ Bottom Dog Press 2012
- The Free Farm: A Novel. Bottom Dog Press 2012
- Mingo Junction. Arcadia Publishing 2011
- Tu Fu Comes to America: A Story in Poems. March Street Press 2010
- The Long River Home: A Novel. Working Lives Series, Bottom Dog Press 2009
- The Kanshi Poems of Taigu Ryokan, trans. by Larry Smith and Mei Hui Liu Huang. Bottom Dog Press 2008.
- Faces and Voices: Tales. Bird Dog Publishing 2006.
- A River Remains: Poems. WordTech Publishing 2006.
- Milldust & Roses: Memoirs. Ridgeway Press 2005; second edition Bottom Dog Press 2005.
- Thoreau's Lost Journal: Poems by Larry Smith. Westron Press, 2001.
- Kenneth Patchen: Rebel Poet in America. A Consortium of Small Presses, 2000 / 2012 (Revised edition) - Biography.
- Chinese Zen Poems: What Hold Has This Mountain? trans. Bottom Dog Press, 1998.
- Working It Out (novel) Ridgeway Press, 1998.
- Beyond Rust: Novella and Stories. Bottom Dog Press, 1995.
- Steel Valley: Postcards and Letters (Poems). Pig Iron Press, 1992.
- Ohio Zen Poems with D. Steven Conkle (A Twinbook) Bottom Dog Press, 1989.
- Across These States (Journal Poem) Bottom Dog Press, 1985.
- Scissors, Paper, Rock (Prose Poems) Cleveland State University Poetry Center, 1982.
- Echo Without Sound (Poems with Etchings by Stephen Smigocki) Northwoods Press, 1982.
- Lawrence Ferlinghetti: Poet-at-Large (Literary biography) Southern Illinois University Press, 1983.
- Kenneth Patchen (Literary biography) Twayne Series, G.K.Hall Publishers, 1978

== Films ==
Two docu-drama video programs, written, co-directed and co-produced with Tom Koba; funded through Ohio Humanities Council and Ohio Arts Council:

- James Wright's Ohio (30 minutes, 1986–1987)
- Kenneth Patchen: An Art of Engagement (30 and 45 minutes, 1987–1988)
- DVD double program: d.a.levy: Cleveland Rebel Poet of the Mimeograph Revolution (Interview with Ed Sanders/ Memorial Reading at levyfest 2005).
