= Sterling SAR-87 =

SAR-87
- Type: Assault rifle
- Place of origin: United Kingdom/Singapore

Production history
- Designed: 1980s
- Manufacturer: Sterling Armaments Company
- Produced: 1987
- No. built: Less than 100
- Variants: Fixed/Folding Stock, 9mm submachine gun

Specifications
- Mass: 3.7 kg
- Length: 0.95 m (3 ft 1 in), 0.75 metres (2 ft 6 in) for folding stock variant
- Cartridge: 5.56×45mm NATO, 9×19mm Parabellum
- Action: Gas-operated
- Rate of fire: 650 rpm
- Effective firing range: 400 m (1,300 ft)
- Feed system: 30-round detachable STANAG magazine
- Sights: Iron sights

The Sterling SAR-87 is a military assault rifle of the late 20th century. The Sterling Assault Rifle (SAR), which included elements from Sterling's earlier Light Automatic Rifle (LAR) design, was jointly engineered by Sterling Armaments Company and Chartered Industries of Singapore in the early 1980s as an advanced version of the AR-18 for the export sales.

It was also offered to the British Armed Forces, who declined it because they were already in the process of adopting the SA80 bullpup design manufactured by Royal Ordnance Factories.

== Design ==
The SAR-87 was a robust weapon based on the well tried AR-18 with the versatility of the M16 rifle. It could also be converted from 5.56×45mm NATO to 9×19mm Parabellum by changing the barrel and bolt assembly, to provide a submachine gun for police forces. Sterling Armaments tried to push the rifle, renamed SAR-87, for some more years, but at the end of the 1980s, it was bought out by British Aerospace/Royal Ordnance and closed. Fewer than 100 SAR-87 rifles were manufactured.
