= McEvoy Motorcycles =

British motorcycle manufacturer

- Industry: Manufacturing and engineering
- Founded: 1925
- Defunct: 1929
- Fate: Wound up
- Headquarters: Derby, UK
- Key people: Cecil Birkin
- Products: Motorcycles and sidecars

McEvoy Motorcycles was a British motorcycle manufacturer based in Derby. The company used engines from Villiers, Blackburne, British Anzani and JAP. The company ceased trading in 1929 when the financier Cecil 'Archie' Birkin was killed in an accident at the Isle of Man TT.

== History ==
Eton College graduate Michael McEvoy began his engineering career at the Rolls-Royce factory in Derby and started McEvoy Motorcycles in 1924. The first bike from McEvoy Motorcycles was a flat twin produced in 1925 with a British Anzani 1100 cc engine. By 1926 the business was successful enough for McEvoy to leave his job at Rolls-Royce and move to larger premises in Derby. The McEvoy range was developed to include a JAP8/45 hp engined V-twin in an advanced "super sports" frame that was capable of 100 miles per hour (160 km/h) and advertised by McEvoy as "the Fastest all-British big twin that holds all high speed British records worth holding in its class".

McEvoy began producing motorcycles with a range of engines, including one with a small 172 cc Villiers engine. All was going well until the company's financial backer, Archie Birkin, died practising for the 1928 Isle of Man TT; the company was wound up in 1929.

== Racing success ==
George William Patchett was a British motorcycle racer and engineer who moved from Brough Superior to work with McEvoy as Competition Manager in 1926. In the same year Patchett recorded a time of 5:32 on the demanding Mountain Course of the Isle of Man TT race. Patchett also rode Anzani and JAP-powered V-twin to successes at the banked Brooklands Circuit at Weybridge. In his time with McEvoy Patchett set nine world records and won the Championship of Southport in 1926 at more than 116 miles per hour (187 km/h).

== Surviving examples ==
In July 2009 a 1928 McEvoy motorcycle with a JAP 8/45 hp 980 cc V-twin engine sold at auction in Henley-on-Thames, UK, for £108,200 ($177,000).
