= Patchwork (disambiguation) =

Patchwork is a form of needlework that involves sewing together pieces of fabric into a larger design.

Patchwork may also refer to:

- Patchwork (Bobbie Gentry album), 1971
- Patchwork (Passenger album), 2020
- Patchwork (board game), a sewing-based board game
- Patchwork (software), a free, web-based patch tracking system
- Patchwork (2015 film), an American horror film
- Patchwork (2021 film), a drama film
- "Patchwork", a song on Tindersticks (1993 album)
