= Pertsch =

Pertsch is a surname. Notable people with the surname include:

- Jennifer Pertsch, Canadian media writer
- Matteo Pertsch (1769–1834), Austrian architect
