= Frederick Eckman =

- Born: 27 October 1924
- Died: 28 October 1996 (aged 72)
- Occupation(s): Magazine and journal editor/publisher

Frederick Eckman (27 October 1924 – 28 October 1996) was a magazine and journal editor or publisher.
