= Pach Brothers =

American photographic studio (active 1867–1947)

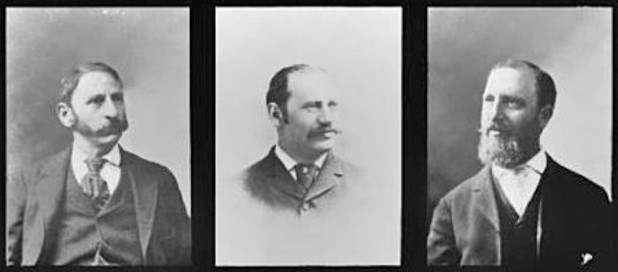
Three of the four Pach brothers (left to right): Gustavus W. Pach, Oscar Pach, and Gotthelf Pach

The Pach Brothers was a family-run photography studio by German-born brothers Gustavus and Gotthelf Pach. The brothers photographed portraits of many notable figures including former United States president Benjamin Harrison and American banker George Foster Peabody. The brother Gotthelf is the father of famed German-American painter Walter Pach.

== History ==
It was founded by the German-born brothers Gustavus Pach (1848–1904), Gotthelf Pach (1852–1925) and Morris Pach (1837–1914). Patrons included famous and ordinary Americans involved in business, politics, government, medicine, law, education, and the arts, as well as thousands of students, families and children who sat for Pach cameras from 1866 onward.

A fire in 1895 destroyed their New York studio and processing rooms as well as their entire negative archive.

The Pach Brothers firm continued photographing for another hundred years until their dissolution in 1994.

== Gallery ==
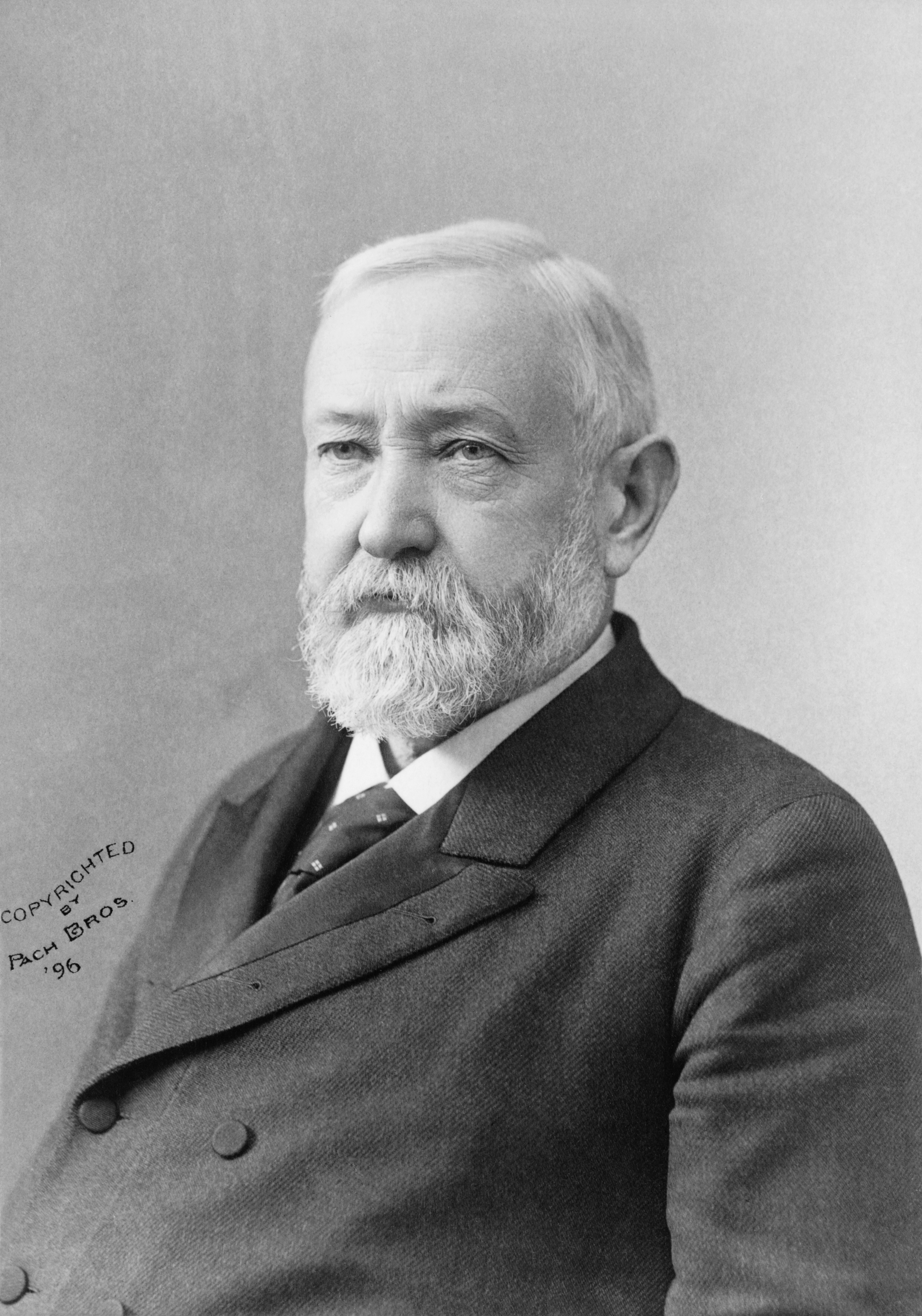
1896 photo of by-then-former United States President Benjamin Harrison, including their copyright notice

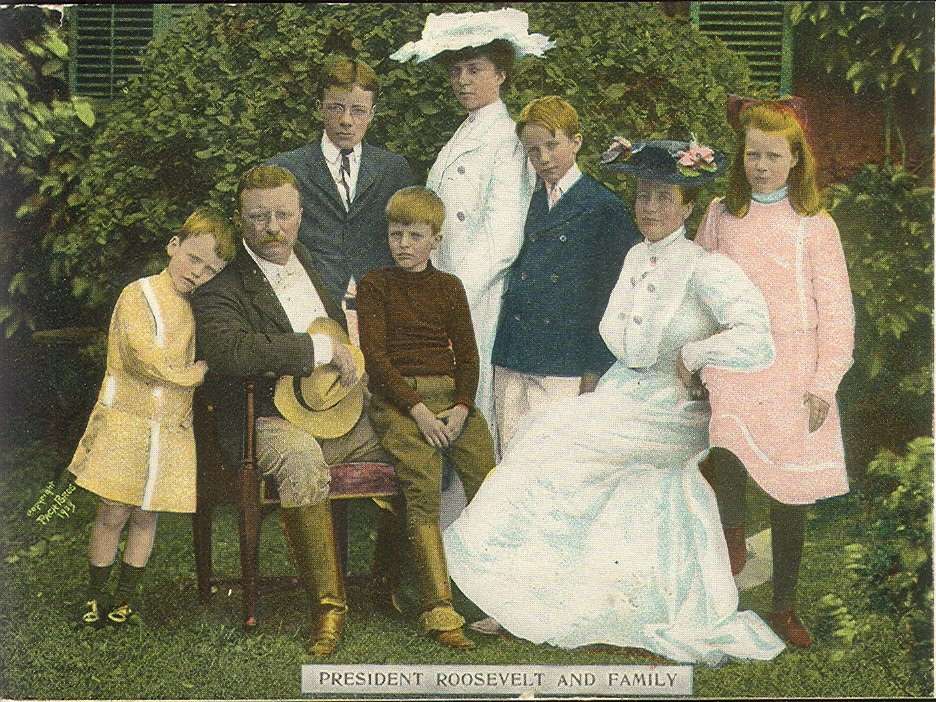
1903 Pach Brothers colorized photo of President Theodore Roosevelt and his family with copyright notice on the left side

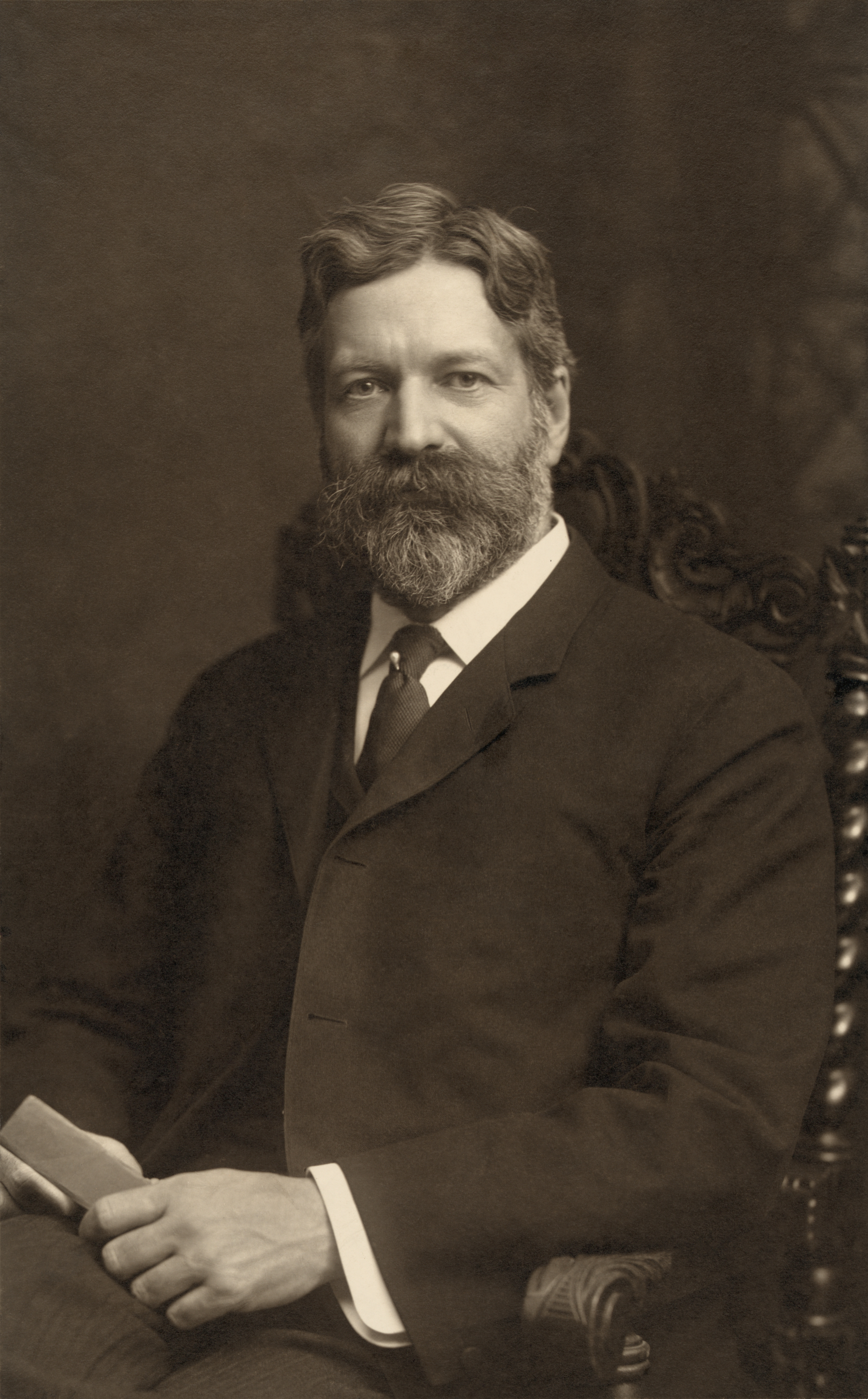
1907 Pach Brothers photo of George Foster Peabody

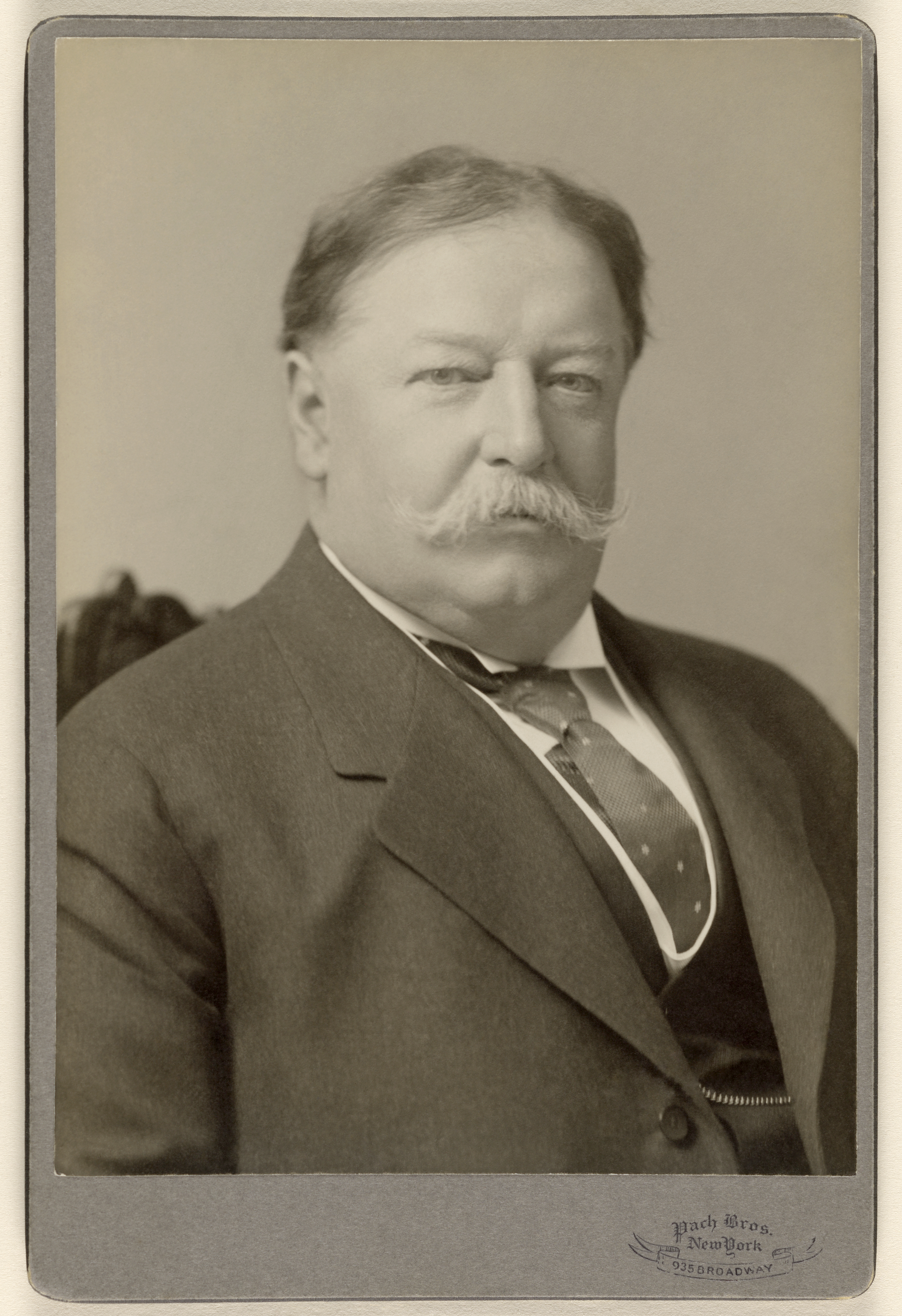
1908 cabinet card of William Howard Taft

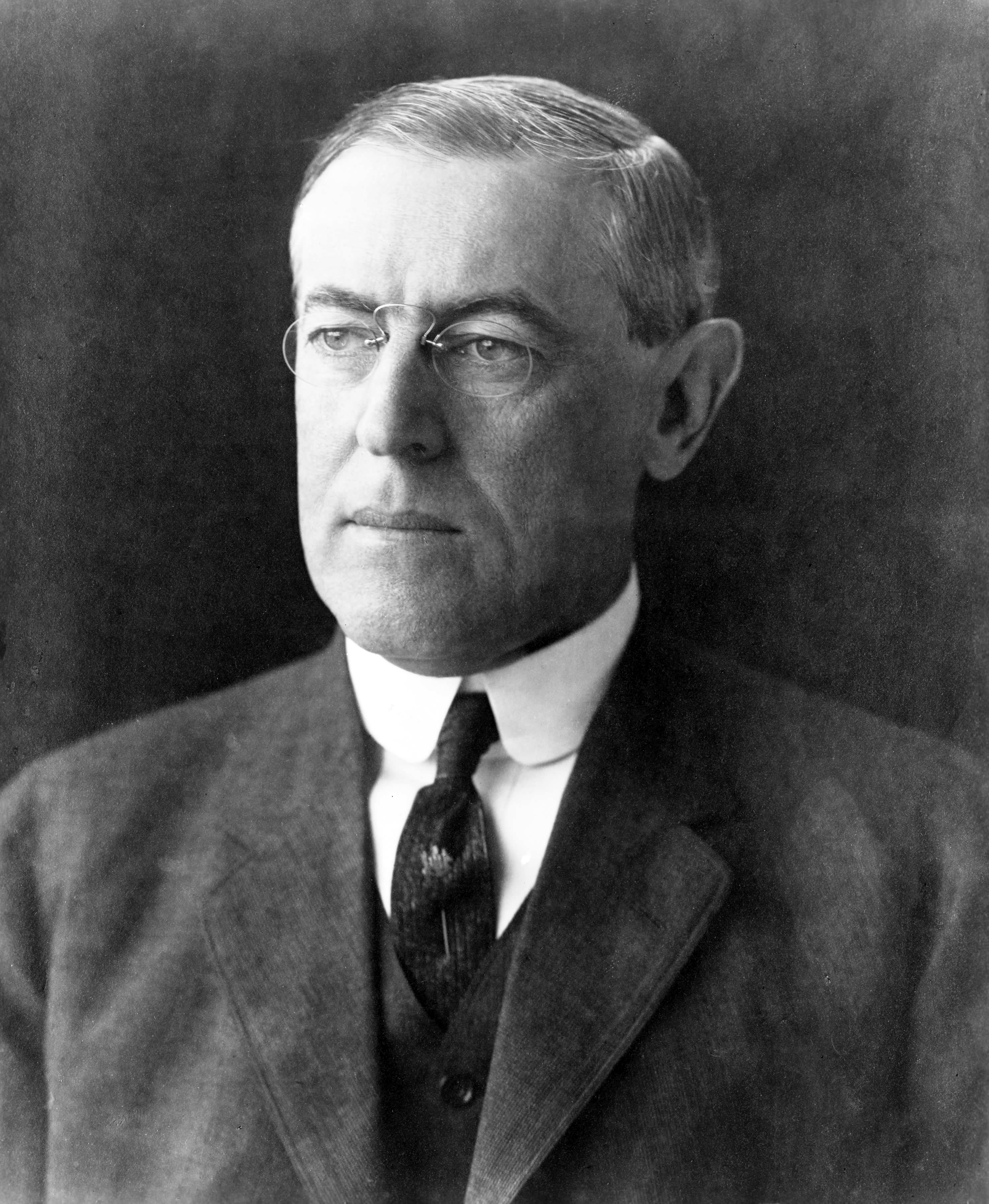
1912 portrait of President Woodrow Wilson
