= Miriam Patchen =

American activist (1914–2000)

- Born: Miriam Oikemus; September 28, 1914; Belmont, Massachusetts, U.S.
- Died: March 6, 2000 (aged 85); Palo Alto, California, U.S.
- Occupation: Activist
- Spouse: Kenneth Patchen

Miriam Patchen (née Oikemus; September 28, 1914 – March 6, 2000) was the wife and muse of poet and novelist Kenneth Patchen, who dedicated each of his more than 40 books to his wife. He also wrote and published a large number of love poems for Miriam, including well-known pieces such as 23rd Street Runs Into Heaven.

== Personal life ==
Miriam Oikemus was born in Belmont, Massachusetts, on September 28, 1914. She met Patchen in Boston in 1933 at a friend's Christmas party. At the time, Miriam was an undergraduate at Massachusetts State College in Amherst. The two kept in touch and Patchen started sending her the first of many love poems. They soon fell in love and decided to get married. First Patchen took her to meet his parents in Youngstown, Ohio, then they got married on June 28, 1934, in nearby Sharon, Pennsylvania. After their wedding, they spent much of their marriage living in New York City in Greenwich Village. Then they relocated to the West Coast, living in San Francisco and later, towards the end of Patchen's life, they settled into a cottage house in Palo Alto where Patchen died.

Miriam was Patchen's strongest supporter and stood by him as the couple struggled financially throughout their marriage. In addition to their financial struggles, the couple had to contend with serious medical problems as well. Kenneth Patchen struggled with chronic pain from a back injury for many years before he finally became incapacitated when his injury was severely aggravated by a botched surgery in 1959. Immobilized by the injury, Patchen's sole caretaker was his wife, and since he was bedridden, he wrote and painted poems from his bed with her assistance. To help make ends meet at this point, Miriam also had to take a job working in retail at a local department store. At the same time, Miriam also had serious health problems, including diabetes and multiple sclerosis.

After her husband's death on January 8, 1972, she became an activist for peace and an advocate for her husband's poetry. Laurent B. Frantz, a civil rights activist, became her companion until he died on September 20, 1998. In 1998, Miriam was the subject of a short documentary film by Kim Roberts titled Miriam Is Not Amused.

She died in Palo Alto, California, on March 6, 2000, aged 85.
