= Sterling Armaments Company =

English arms manufacturer

The Sterling Engineering Company Ltd was an arms manufacturer based in Dagenham, famous for manufacturing the Sterling submachine gun (L2A3), ArmaLite AR-18 and Sterling SAR-87 assault rifles and parts of Jaguar cars. The company went bankrupt in 1988.

During World War II, engineers George Lanchester and George William Patchett oversaw the manufacture of the Lanchester submachine gun. Patchett afterwards went on to design the Patchett machine carbine which, after a competitive trial in 1947, was adopted by the British Army in 1953 as the L2A1 Sterling submachine gun, replacing the Sten gun. The weapon was later upgraded to the L2A3, the Sterling Mk IV.

The Sterling brand name was revived in 2016 by James Edmiston, a former director of the original company. It is, however, a dormant company, according to accounts filed with Companies House, with no stated plans to do any business beyond engraving services.

== Sources ==
- The Guns of Dagenham - Collector Grade Publications, Canada (5 Jan 1996), ISBN 0-88935-204-6
- Last Enfield - SA80: The Reluctant Rifle, Steve Raw, R.Blake Stevens, ISBN 0-88935-303-4
- Military Small Arms of the 20th Century, 4th Edition, by Ian V. Hogg and John Weeks, ISBN 0-910676-28-3, Ca 1981
- AK56 magazine, December 2006
