= Walter Pach =

Artist and writer

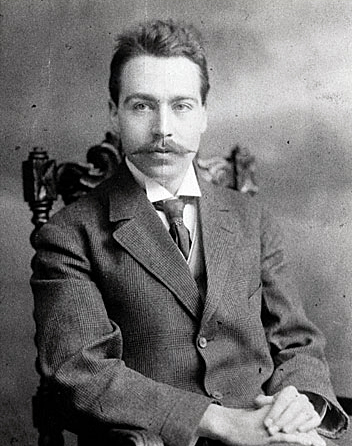
- Pach circa 1909
- Born: July 1, 1883; Manhattan, New York City
- Died: November 27, 1958 (aged 75); Manhattan, New York City
- Occupations: artist, art historian
- Spouse: Magdalene Frohberg (m. 1914; died 1950)
- Children: Raymond Pach
- Parent: Gotthelf Pach

Walter Pach (July 1, 1883 – November 27, 1958) was an American artist, critic, lecturer, art adviser, and art historian who wrote extensively about modern art and championed its cause. Through his numerous books, articles, and translations of European art texts Pach brought the emerging modernist viewpoint to the American public.

He organized exhibitions of contemporary art for New York City galleries of the period. He was also extremely helpful to Arthur B. Davies, president of the landmark exhibition of 1913, the "International Exhibition of Modern Art," known as the Armory Show, as well as to one of its founders Walt Kuhn, by bringing together leading contemporary European and American artists. Another original founder Jerome Myers spent over a year supervising the American portion of the show.

Pach helped John Quinn and Walter Arensberg gather their collections. He also secured individual works for museums, such as a portrait by Thomas Eakins for the Louvre, and Jacques-Louis David's The Death of Socrates for the Metropolitan Museum of Art.

Pach's fluency in French, German, and Spanish made it possible for him to understand and interpret the avant-garde ideas developing in Europe and translate them for the English-speaking audience. He was able to communicate personally with many noted artists in Europe and Mexico and mediate between gallery dealers and museum curators on their behalf. His correspondence with major figures in 20th-century art are an important source of information, not only about the artists but about the art world during the first half of the 20th century.

== Biography ==
Pach was born in New York City on July 11, 1883. His father, Gotthelf Pach, was a prominent commercial photographer who, with his family, ran the New York studio of Pach Bros. They did most of the photographic work for the Metropolitan Museum of Art. The young Pach often accompanied his father on museum assignments. In 1903, Pach graduated from the City College of New York with a degree in art. He studied with Robert Henri at the New York School of Art and went abroad to paint with William Merritt Chase in the summers of 1903 and 1904.

In 1907, Pach moved to France and became part of the Gertrude and Leo Stein circle, and moved among the Parisian avant-garde, exhibiting with them and writing about their work and new artistic vision. In 1908 he wrote the first article on Cézanne to be published in the U.S., which appeared in Scribner's Magazine. He also interviewed Claude Monet that year and published an article about him in the same periodical. He helped manage and teach in several of William Merritt Chase's summer art schools in various European locales.

Pach was the only American artist to be closely affiliated with the Section d'Or group of artists, including Albert Gleizes, Jean Metzinger, Duchamp brothers Marcel Duchamp, Raymond Duchamp-Villon, Jacques Villon and others. Pach was responsible for securing loans from these painters for the 1913 Armory Show. Most of the artists in Paris who sent works to the Armory Show knew Pach personally and entrusted their works to him.

Pach married artist Magdalene Frohberg in 1914, and their son Raymond was born at the end of that year. He began advising Walter and Louise Arensberg on their art collecting and introduced them to Marcel Duchamp in 1915. The following year, with Duchamp and the Arensbergs, he was a major force in the creation of the Society of Independent Artists. In the summer of 1918 Pach taught two classes, including one on modern art, at the University of California at Berkeley. In the summer of 1922 he taught at the National Autonomous University of Mexico, where he lectured and wrote about Native American art. He helped organize exhibitions and raised money for a museum to be dedicated to the indigenous arts of the Americas. He was also a friend of José Clemente Orozco and Diego Rivera and helped organize the Mexican chapter of the Society of Independent Artists. In 1923 he began an affiliation with New York University, where he taught periodically.

While he is not remembered today as a painter, Pach devoted much of his creative efforts to painting. He thought of himself both an artist and a writer, despite advice from friends like art historian Bernard Berenson who urged him to devote his time to writing.

His writings include monographs on a wide range of subjects, social commentary on the art world, and a book on museum structures. His first publications included brochures for the 1913 Armory Show, including Odilon Redon, and a book about the work of his close friend Raymond Duchamp-Villon titled A Sculptor's Architecture.

In 1923, Pach wrote Georges Seurat, a book art historian John Rewald later cited by as an important text on the artist. Masters of Modern Art and a monograph on Duchamp-Villon in French were published the following year. The first solo exhibition of his own art took place in 1925 at Joseph Brummer Galleries, New York.

He created a stir in 1928 in the art world with Ananias, or The False Artist, a well-known indictment of opportunistic artists and corruption in the art world.

Pach considered Vincent van Gogh a seminal figure in the development of modern art and was the first historian to lecture on him in America. He published his well-received monograph, Vincent Van Gogh, in 1936, and translated the journals of Eugène Delacroix in 1937. His recollections of a life spent in art, Queer Thing, Painting, appeared in 1938. Ingres was published in 1939, as well as Masterpieces of Art, written for the 1939 New York World's Fair, for which he was the exhibition director. His 1948 The Art Museum in America called into question the relevance, responsibility, and future of the American art museum. He long championed the artists of Mexico and published an essay on Diego Rivera in 1951 for the National Museum of Fine Arts, Mexico, for its 50-year retrospective exhibition on the artist. His last book, The Classical Tradition in Modern Art, was published posthumously in 1959.

He died on November 27, 1958, in Manhattan, New York City.

== Sources ==
- Malloy, Nancy and Stover, Catherine. A Finding Aid to the Walter Pach Papers, 1883-1980, in the Archives of American Art. The Walter Pach Papers Online, Smithsonian Archives of American Art.
- McCarthy, Laurette E. Walter Pach (1883-1958): The Armory Show and the Untold Story of Modern Art in America. College Park, PA: Pennsylvania State University Press, 2011. ISBN 9780271037400
- Tomkins, Calvin. Duchamp: A Biography. New York: Henry Holt and Company, 1996. ISBN 0-8050-5789-7
