= Julie Delporte =

Canadian cartoonist and illustrator

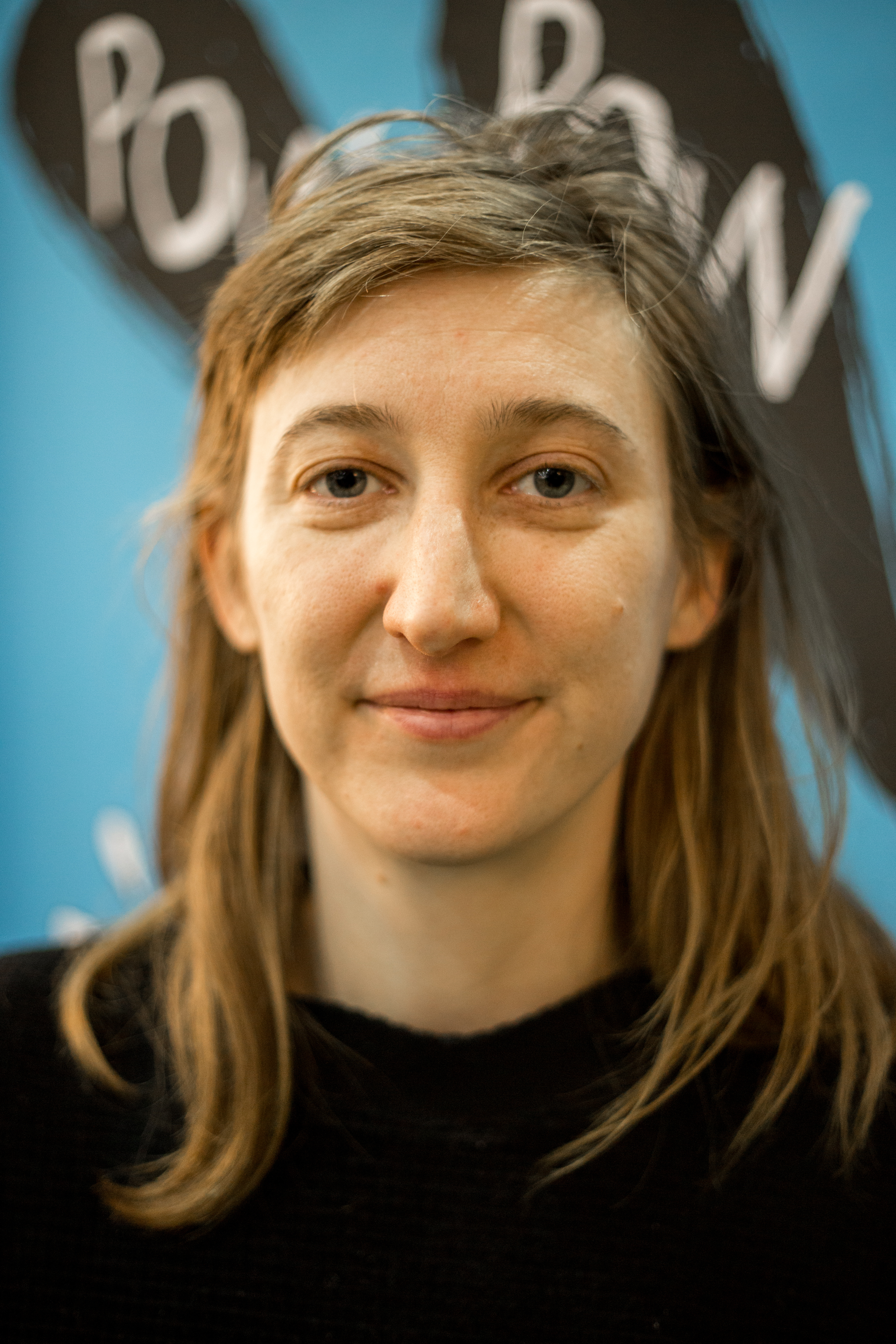
- Julie Delporte in Montreal, 2016
- Born: 1983 (age 42–43) St. Malo, France
- Area: Cartoonist

Julie Delporte (born in 1983) is a French-Canadian cartoonist and illustrator. She lives in Montreal, Quebec, Canada.

== Biography ==
Delporte immigrated to Montreal from Saint-Malo, France, in 2005. She had studied journalism in France because of her love of writing, but did not enjoy being a journalist. Delporte had not attended art school or had family role-models for living and working as an artist, and it was not until she moved to Montreal that she found what she describes as "the social and economic possibility to become an artist." In 2011, Delporte was a fellow at the Center for Cartoon Studies.

Delporte is one of the organizers of Montreal's annual "48 Heures" comics festival. Beginning in 2007 she co-hosted a radio show on comics, Dans ta bulle!, which ran for a decade. In 2017 she founded Tristesse magazine with Rosalie Lavoie, Catherine Ocelot, Marie Saur, and David Turgeon.

At age 35, Delporte began to identify as lesbian, which she explores in her comic memoir Portrait of a Body.

== Influences and themes ==
Delporte has cited Belgian cartoonist Dominique Goblet as an influence on her work, and also credits Joanna Hellgren, Amanda Vähämäki, Jean-Christophe Menu, and David Libens as influences. She also describes Tove Jansson, the creator of the Moomins, as "the first woman in comics history whose work and life I loved," and includes Jansson as a central figure in her 2019 graphic novel, This Woman's Work.

Delporte is known for her evocative drawings featuring colored pencil, and often including tape or other markings that reflect her process. She began working in colored pencils early in her career, in order to develop a deliberately unique drawing style. Her writing is often characterized by diary-like storytelling, and quotations or interjections from other cultural or historical figures, particularly women artists and writers (such as Virginie Despentes, Annie Ernaux, Elena Ferrante, Chantal Akerman, Geneviève Castrée, Kate Bush, and others), and describes art-making as a kind of "collective intelligence," in dialogue with other artists, thinkers, and readers. Delporte's work often deals with themes of womanhood and women's labour, feminism and feminist intellectual traditions, mental health, anger, sexuality, and sexual assault.

== Publications ==
- Encore ça, Colosse, 2008
- Le Rêve de la catastrophe, Colosse, 2009, with Vincent Giard
- Le Dernier kilomètre No. 1, Colosse, 2011
- La Bédé-réalité: La band dessinée autobiographique à l'heure des technologies numériques, Colosse / Essais, 2011
- Le Carnet bleu, Colosse, 2011
- Le Dernier kilomètre No. 2, Colosse, 2012
- Journal, Koyama Press, 2013
- Je suis un raton laveur, La courte échelle, 2013
- Journal , L'Agrume, 2014
- Everywhere Antennas, Drawn & Quarterly, 2014
- Je vois des antennes partout, Pow Pow, 2015
- Moi aussi je voulais l'emporter, Pow Pow, 2017
- Nous étions béguines, L'Appât, 2018
- This Woman's Work, Drawn & Quarterly, 2019
- Portrait of a Body, Drawn & Quarterly, 2024
