= Sterling submachine gun =

British submachine gun

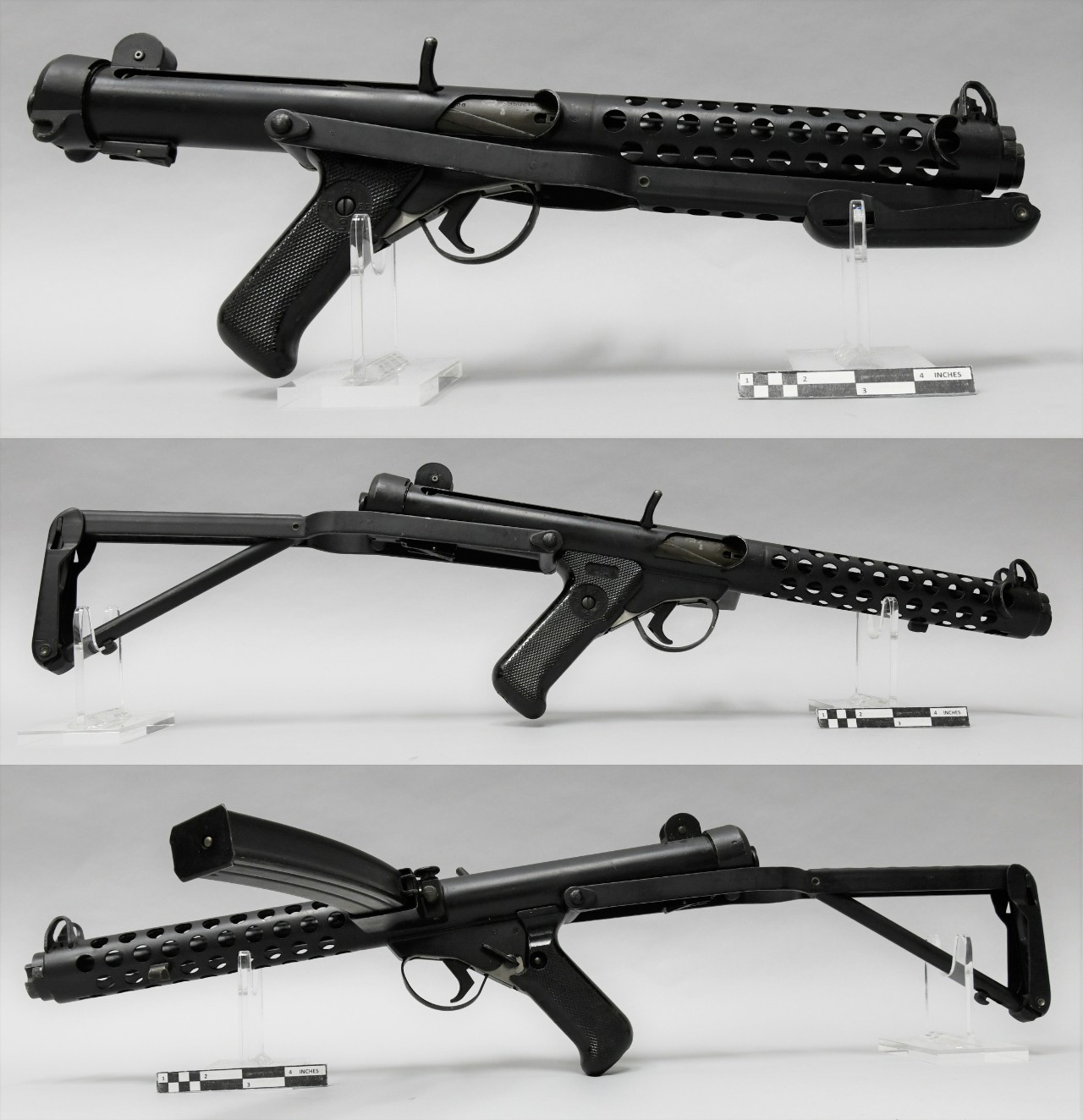
- Various views of a Sterling Mk. 4/L2A3 (right side with folded/unfolded stock, left side with unfolded stock)
- Type: Submachine gun
- Place of origin: United Kingdom

Service history
- In service: 1944–present
- Used by: See Users
- Wars: World War II (Limited); Malayan Emergency; Korean War; Mau Mau Uprising; Suez Crisis; 1958 Lebanon crisis; Bizerte crisis; Aden Emergency; Indonesia–Malaysia Confrontation; Rhodesian Bush War; Portuguese Colonial War; Vietnam War; Laotian Civil War; Bangladesh Liberation War; Indo-Pakistani wars and conflicts; Nigerian Civil War; Second Malayan Emergency; The Troubles; Angolan Civil War; Iran–Iraq War; Falklands War; Lebanese Civil War; Sri Lankan Civil War; Insurgency in Jammu and Kashmir; Gulf War; Nepalese Civil War; Iraq War; Libyan Civil War

Production history
- Designer: George William Patchett
- Designed: 1944
- Manufacturer: Sterling Armaments Company
- Produced: 1953–1988
- No. built: 400,000+
- Variants: See Variants

Specifications
- Mass: 2.7 kilograms (6.0 lb)
- Length: 686 millimetres (27.0 in); Folded stock: 481 millimetres (18.9 in)
- Barrel length: 196 millimetres (7.7 in)
- Cartridge: 9×19mm Parabellum; 7.62×51mm NATO (Prototype only).30 Carbine(PAWS ZX prototype).357 (proposal).40 S&W(PAWS ZX prototype).45 ACP(PAWS ZX)
- Action: Straight blowback
- Rate of fire: 550 rounds/min
- Effective firing range: 200 metres (220 yd); Suppressed: 50–100 metres (55–109 yd)
- Feed system: 34-round box magazine or 32- or 50-round box magazine from the Sten and Lanchester
- Sights: Iron sights

The Sterling submachine gun is a British submachine gun (SMG). It was tested by the British Army in 1944–1945, but did not start to replace the Sten until 1953. A successful and reliable design, it remained standard issue in the British Army until 1994, when it began to be replaced by the L85A1, a bullpup assault rifle.

== History ==
In 1944, the British General Staff issued a specification for a new submachine gun to replace the Sten. It stated that the new weapon should weigh no more than six pounds (2.7 kg), should fire 9×19mm Parabellum ammunition, have a rate of fire of no more than 500 rounds per minute, and be sufficiently accurate to allow five consecutive shots (fired in semi-automatic mode) to be placed inside a one-foot-square (30 cm × 30 cm) target at a distance of 100 yd (91 m).

To meet the new requirement, George William Patchett, the chief designer at the Sterling Armaments Company of Dagenham, submitted a sample weapon of new design in early 1944. The first Patchett prototype gun was similar to the Sten insofar as its cocking handle (and the slot it moved back and forth in) was placed in line with the ejection port though it was redesigned soon afterwards and moved up to a slightly offset position. The army quickly recognised the Patchett's significantly increased accuracy and reliability compared to the Sten and ordered 120 examples for trials. Towards the end of the Second World War, some of these trial samples are rumoured to have been used in combat by airborne troops during the battle of Arnhem and by special forces at other locations in Northern Europe where it was officially known as the Patchett Machine Carbine Mk 1. For example, a Patchett submachine gun (serial numbered 078 and now held by the Imperial War Museum), was carried in action by Colonel Robert W. P. Dawson while he was Commanding Officer of No. 4 Commando, during the attack on Walcheren as part of Operation Infatuate in November 1944. Because the Patchett/Sterling can use straight Sten magazines as well as the curved Sterling design, there were no interoperability problems.

After the war, with large numbers of Sten guns in the inventory, there was little interest in replacing them with a superior design. However, in 1947, a competitive trial between the Patchett, an Enfield design, a new BSA design and an experimental Australian design was held, with the Sten for comparison. The trial was inconclusive but was followed by further development and more trials. Eventually, the Patchett design won, and the decision was made in 1951 for the British Army to adopt it. It started to replace the Sten in 1953 as the "Sub-Machine Gun L2A1". Its last non-suppressed variation was the L2A3 but the model changes were minimal throughout its development life.

The price of an L2A3 in 1955 was £19.50, which is about £443 when adjusted for inflation.

Sterling submachine guns with minor cosmetic alterations were used in the production of the Star Wars films as props for the E-11 blaster rifle used by Imperial Stormtroopers. More drastically altered Sterlings were used as DH-17 blaster pistols in the hands of Rebel Alliance soldiers, though this weapon was mostly depicted via resin replicas that were cast from a "hero" prop and only a few live-firing Sterlings were modified compared to those used as E-11s. The E-11 itself would later come to be depicted by non-firing Sterling replicas, namely Model Gun Corporation replicas, which were used in Return of the Jedi and S&T Sterling L2A1 airsoft guns which have been used from Rogue One onwards.

== Design details ==
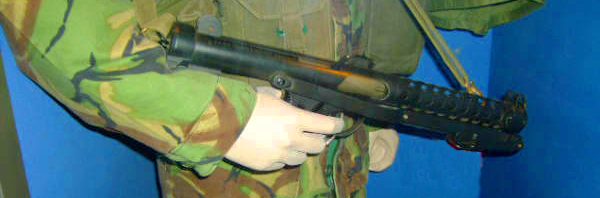
A Sterling submachine gun in the Imperial War Museum

The Sterling submachine gun is constructed entirely of steel and plastic and has a shoulder stock that folds underneath the weapon. There is an adjustable rear sight, which can be flipped between 100 and 200 yard settings. Although of conventional blowback design firing from an open bolt, there are some unusual features: for example, the bolt has helical grooves cut into the surface to remove dirt and fouling from the inside of the receiver to increase reliability. There are two concentric recoil springs which cycle the bolt, as opposed to the single spring arrangement used by many other SMG designs. This double-spring arrangement is intended to give improved reliability when firing 9mm ammunition types other than the British '2Z' standard, which typically have different propellant charges and bullet weights.

The Sterling's double-stack, double-feed box magazine was designed in 1946 by George Patchett. While the original Patchett gun was intended to take Sten or Lanchester magazines, these magazines' poor reliability led Patchett to initially redesign the Sten magazine with a roller platform to reduce friction, and then to construct a new double-feed magazine that implemented the earlier roller platform, a stamped metal construction, and a curved magazine body, allowing the 9×19mm round to feed more reliably. The bolt feeds ammunition alternately from the top and bottom of the magazine lips, and its fixed firing pin is designed so that it does not line up with the primer in the cartridge until the cartridge has entered the chamber. In its final iteration, the magazine uses a four-piece construction with scalloped, spot-welded edges and positioning notches. While originally intended to hold forty rounds, concerns over the magazine's ability to fit into the ammunition pouch of the then-new 1944 Pattern Web Equipment led the magazine to be shortened to its final capacity of thirty-four rounds; when introducing the Mk 7 Pistol variant in 1983, Sterling produced magazines with capacities of ten and fifteen rounds for that weapon, as well as introducing "twin-stacked" versions of these and the original 34 round magazine. The Sterling magazine is said to be one of the best ever designed. While Sterling provided magazines for British Armed Forces weapons, with these being designated as "Magazine, 9mm, L1A1", cost issues led the Ministry of Defence to pursue the design and production of a non-Sterling L1A2 version which used a stamped and electrically seam-welded two-piece construction with a singular positioning lug and was 9.8" long down the rear spine compared to the 9.6" of Sterling-produced magazines. Production Sterlings retain the earlier Patchett gun's compatibility with Sten and Lanchester magazines; while the Lanchester gun is theoretically capable of using Sterling magazines, the same cannot be said for the Sten gun since a Sterling magazine intrudes 3/32 inch further into the bolt way than a Sten magazine and so attempting to fire a Sten gun with a Sterling magazine fitted would cause the breech block to foul the rear of the magazine, while attempting to counteract this by withdrawing the magazine by 3/32 inch would merely result in the magazine's top round being out of alignment with the breech block by 3/16 inches. This issue is not present on Sterling guns fitted with Sten magazines; while the magazine will be 3/32 inch further away from the breech block's centre line, the top round remains in line with the breech and so can be reached by the Sterling's more robust feed horns. The Sterling gun and its magazine were purportedly designed this way in order to prevent a situation where, instead of buying the actual Sterling gun, prospective users might only buy its magazines and then use these with their pre-existing Sten guns.

The Sterling employs a degree of what is known as Advanced Primer Ignition, in that the cartridge is fired while the bolt is still moving forward, a fraction of a second before the round is fully chambered. The firing of the round thus not only sends the bullet flying down the barrel but simultaneously resists the forwards movement of the bolt. By this means it is possible to employ a lighter bolt than if the cartridge was fired after the bolt had already stopped, as in simple blowback, since the energy of the expanding gases would then only have to overcome the bolt's static inertia (plus spring resistance) to push it backwards again and cycle the weapon; whereas in this arrangement some of this energy is used up in counteracting the bolt's forwards momentum as well; and thus the bolt does not have to be so massive. The lighter bolt makes not only for a lighter gun, but a more controllable one since there is less mass moving to and fro within it as it fires.

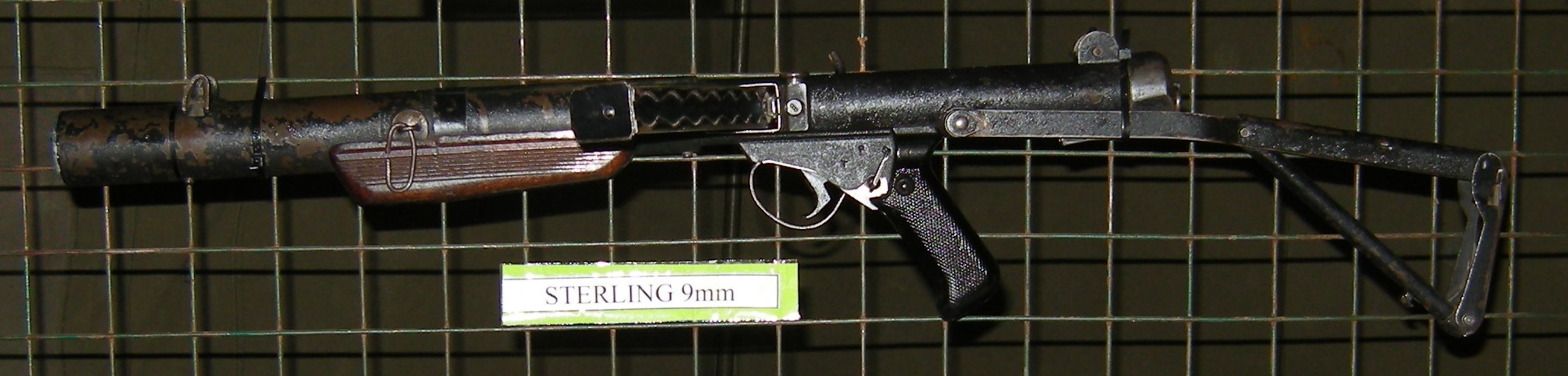
An example of the Mk 5 suppressed variant. The wooden foregrip was unique to commercial and export models and did not appear on the British-issue L34A1 model.

The suppressed version of the Sterling (L34A1/Mk.5) was developed for covert operations. This version uses a ported barrel surrounded by a cylinder with expansion chambers. The Australian and New Zealand SAS regiments used the suppressed version of the Sterling during the Vietnam War. It was used by both Argentinian and British Special Forces during the Falklands War. A Sterling was used by Libyan agents to kill WPC Yvonne Fletcher outside the Libyan Embassy in London, which sparked the 1984 siege of the building.

The Sterling has a reputation for excellent reliability under adverse conditions and, even though it fires from an open bolt, good accuracy. With some practice, it is very accurate when fired in short bursts. While it has been reported that the weapon poses no problems for left-handed users to operate, it is not recommended without the wearing of ballistic eye protection. The path of the ejected cartridge cases is slightly down and backward, so mild burns can occasionally be incurred by left-handed shooters.

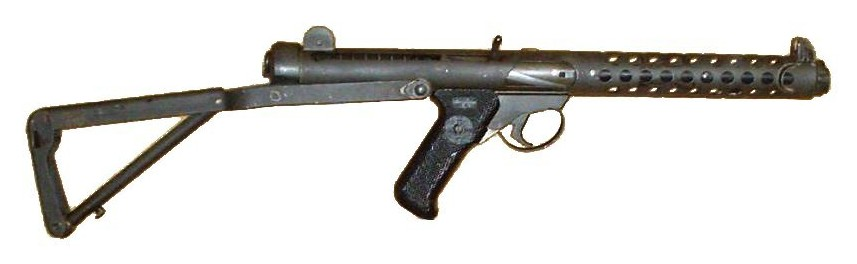
Side view showing angled ejection port and offset cocking handle. The angled ejection port deflects the spent cartridges downwards.

A bayonet of a similar design as that for the L1A1 Self-Loading Rifle was produced and issued in British Army service, but was rarely employed except for ceremonial duties. Both bayonets were derived from the version issued with the Rifle No. 5 Mk I "jungle carbine", the main difference being a smaller ring on the SLR bayonet to fit the rifle's muzzle. When mounted, the Sterling bayonet was offset to the left of the weapon's vertical line, which gave a more natural balance when used for bayonet-fighting.

For a right-handed shooter, the correct position for the left hand while firing is on the ventilated barrel-casing, but not on the magazine, as the pressure from holding the magazine can increase the risk of stoppages, and a loose magazine can lead to dropping the weapon. The barrel-casing hold provides greater control of the weapon, so the right hand can intermittently be used for other tasks. A semi-circular protrusion on the right-hand side of the weapon, approximately two inches from the muzzle, serves to prevent the supporting hand from moving too far forward and over the muzzle.

== Manufacture ==
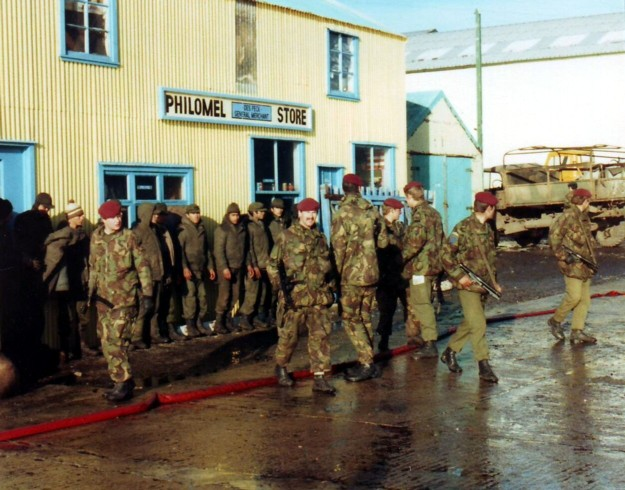
Argentine POWs guarded by soldiers of 2 PARA with Sterling submachine guns, June 1982

Over 400,000 Sterlings were manufactured between 1953 and 1988. Sterling built them at their factory in Dagenham for the British armed forces and for overseas sales, while Liverpool's Royal Ordnance Factory Fazakerley constructed them exclusively for the British military. Production ceased in 1988 with the closing of Sterling Armaments by British Aerospace/Royal Ordnance.

Sterling produced its own magazines, with those intended for British military use being marked "L1A1". L1A2 magazines were variously manufactured by Fazakerley, Royal Laboratories Woolwich, Rolls Razor, and Mettoy; out of the 1,723,623 magazines contracted for, Mettoy was to produce 227,262, Rolls Razor was to produce 309,800, and the remaining 1.2 million were produced by Fazakerley and Woolwich.

A Chilean variant was made by FAMAE as the PAF submachine gun but was different externally as it had a shorter receiver lacking the barrel shroud.

Canada also manufactured a variant under licence, called the Submachine Gun 9 mm C1 made by Canadian Arsenals Limited. It is made from stamped metal instead of cast metal and is capable of handling a C1 bayonet, which is only used during public exhibition events and not for combat operations.

A similar weapon, the Sub-Machine Gun Carbine 9 mm 1A1, was manufactured under licence by the Indian Ordnance Factory at Kanpur beginning in 1963, along with a Sub-Machine Gun Carbine 9 mm 2A1, manufactured beginning in 1977. As of 2012, it has been reported that at least 5,000 of these SMGs were made in India.

The PAWS ZX was manufactured in the United States by Police Arms Weapons Services. It was available in 9x19mm Parabellum (ZX-5) and .45 ACP (ZX-7). The weapon was available in closed-bolt semi automatic with various barrel lengths and the ability to use magazines from Stens (ZX-6), M3 Grease guns (ZX-8) and even UZI magazines (ZX-6A1). An integrally suppressed variant, the ZX7SS existed. One prototype was chambered in .40 S&W and prototypes were to be made in .30 Carbine using M1 Carbine magazines. Advantages of the ZX trigger group was the amount of only three components compared to the 36 of the Sterling. The pistol grip was rubber instead of plastic which improved comfort and handling. The molly coat crackle paint was less labour-intensive for mass production than that used by Sterling and allowed the user/armourer to repair scratches by field stripping the weapon completely and re-baking the receiver in an oven.

== Variants ==
- British Armed Forces
  - Unassigned: Patchett Machine Carbine Mark 1 (trials commenced in 1944)
  - Unassigned: Patchett Machine Carbine Mark 1 & Folding Bayonet (same as above but with folding bayonet, never accepted)
  - L2A1: (Patchett Machine Carbine Mark 2) Adopted in 1953.
  - L2A2: (Sterling Mark 3) Adopted in 1955.
  - L2A3: (Sterling Mark 4) Adopted in 1956. Last regular version in service with the British Army, Royal Marines and RAF Regiment.
  - L34A1: Suppressed version (Sterling-Patchett Mark 5).
  - Unassigned: Various unofficial drill purpose conversions of unserviceable weapons prior to 1973.
  - L49A1: Official drill purpose version introduced in 1973 and converted from unserviceable L2A3s.
- Sterling Mark 6 "Police": a semi-automatic-only closed-bolt version for police forces and private sales. A US export version had a longer barrel (16 in (410 mm)) to comply with Bureau of Alcohol, Tobacco, Firearms and Explosives (ATF) regulations. Beginning in 2009, Century Arms began marketing a similar semi-auto only carbine manufactured by Wiselite Arms. These too have a 16-inch barrel. They are assembled using a mix of newly made US parts, and parts from demilitarized Sterling Mark 4 parts kits. This is often marketed as the Sterling Sporter.
- Sterling Mark 7 "Para-pistol": Special machine pistol variant issued to commando and plainclothes intelligence units. It had a barrel shortened to 4 in (100 mm), fixed vertical foregrip designed by Black & Decker, and weighed 4.84 lb (2.20 kg). If used with a short 10- or 15-round magazine, it could be stowed in a special holster. It also could be used as a Close Quarters Battle weapon with the addition of an optional solid stock.
- Canadian Army
  - C1 Submachine Gun: Adopted in 1958, replacing the STEN gun in general service. It was different from the British L2 in that it made extensive use of stamped metal parts rather the more expensive castings used by British production SMGs. It also had a removable trigger guard for use with gloves in arctic operations as a standard option, and used a different 30-round magazine with a stamped metal follower. A 10-round magazine was also available for crews of armoured vehicles.
- Indian Army
  - SAF Carbine 1A: Indian made Sterling L2A1.
  - SAF Carbine 1A1: Improved version with safety sear to prevent bolt balance.
  - SAF Carbine 2A1: Sterling Mark V silenced carbine.

=== 7.62 NATO variant ===
A prototype rifle in the 7.62×51mm NATO calibre was manufactured, using some components from the SMG. The rifle used lever-delayed blowback to handle the more powerful rounds and was fed from 30-round Bren magazines. To prevent ammunition cookoff, the weapon fired from an open bolt. Only two examples of the rifle are known to have been produced, possibly to test the concepts of a proposed new product. One was configured to fill the role of an LMG and the other a more standard rifle setup. They were not put into production.

== Users ==
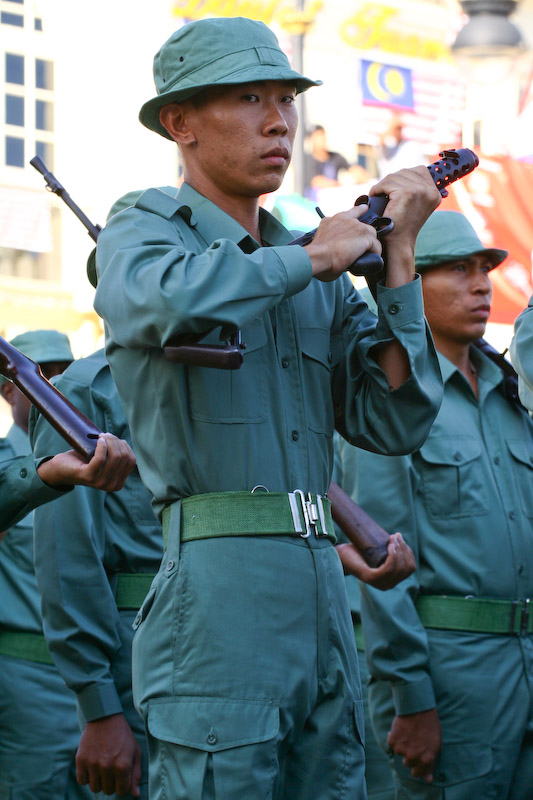
Royal Malaysian Police officer with Sterling L2A3 (Mk 4) submachine gun

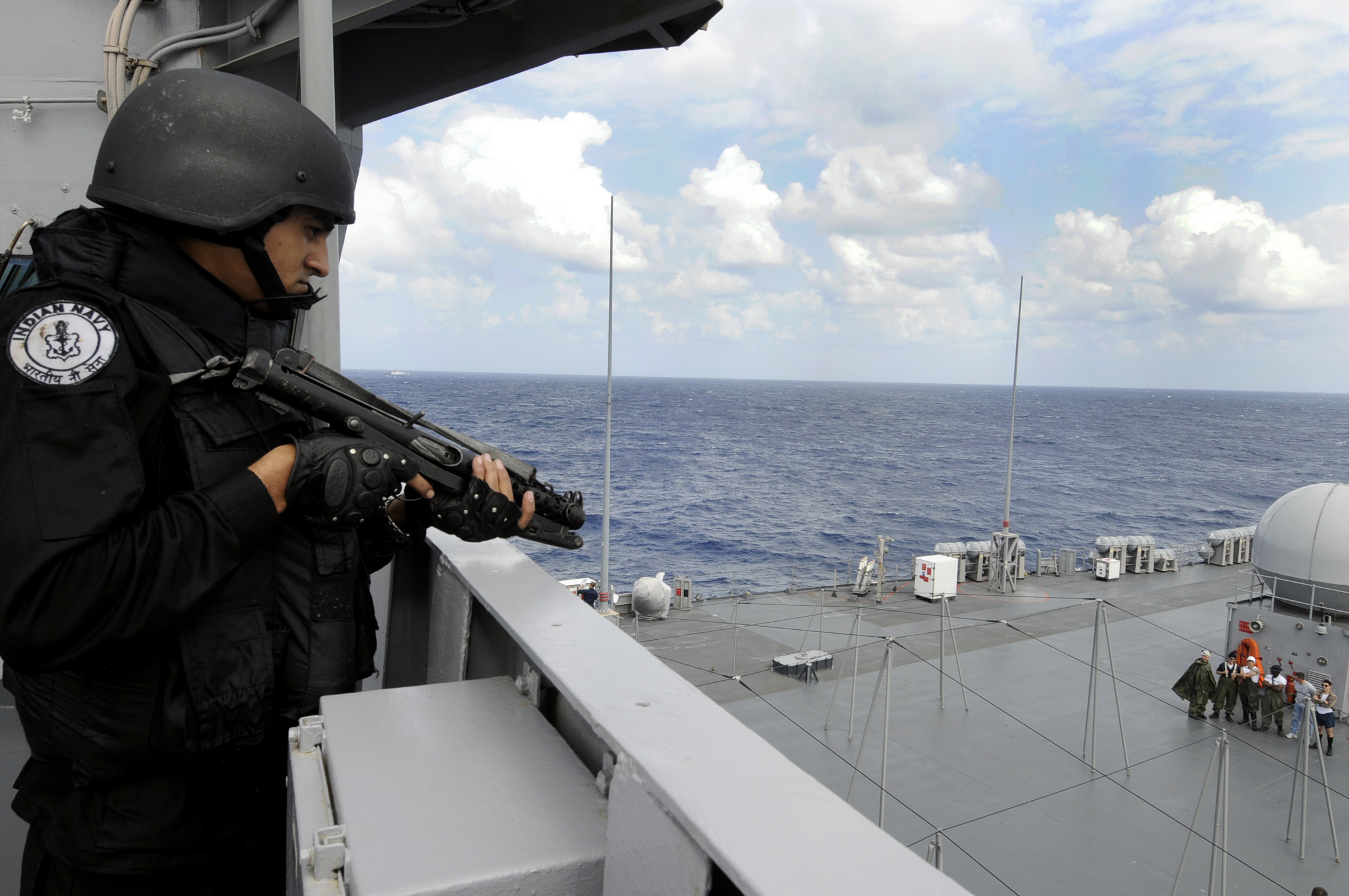
Indian Navy officer with an Indian manufactured 1A1 Carbine

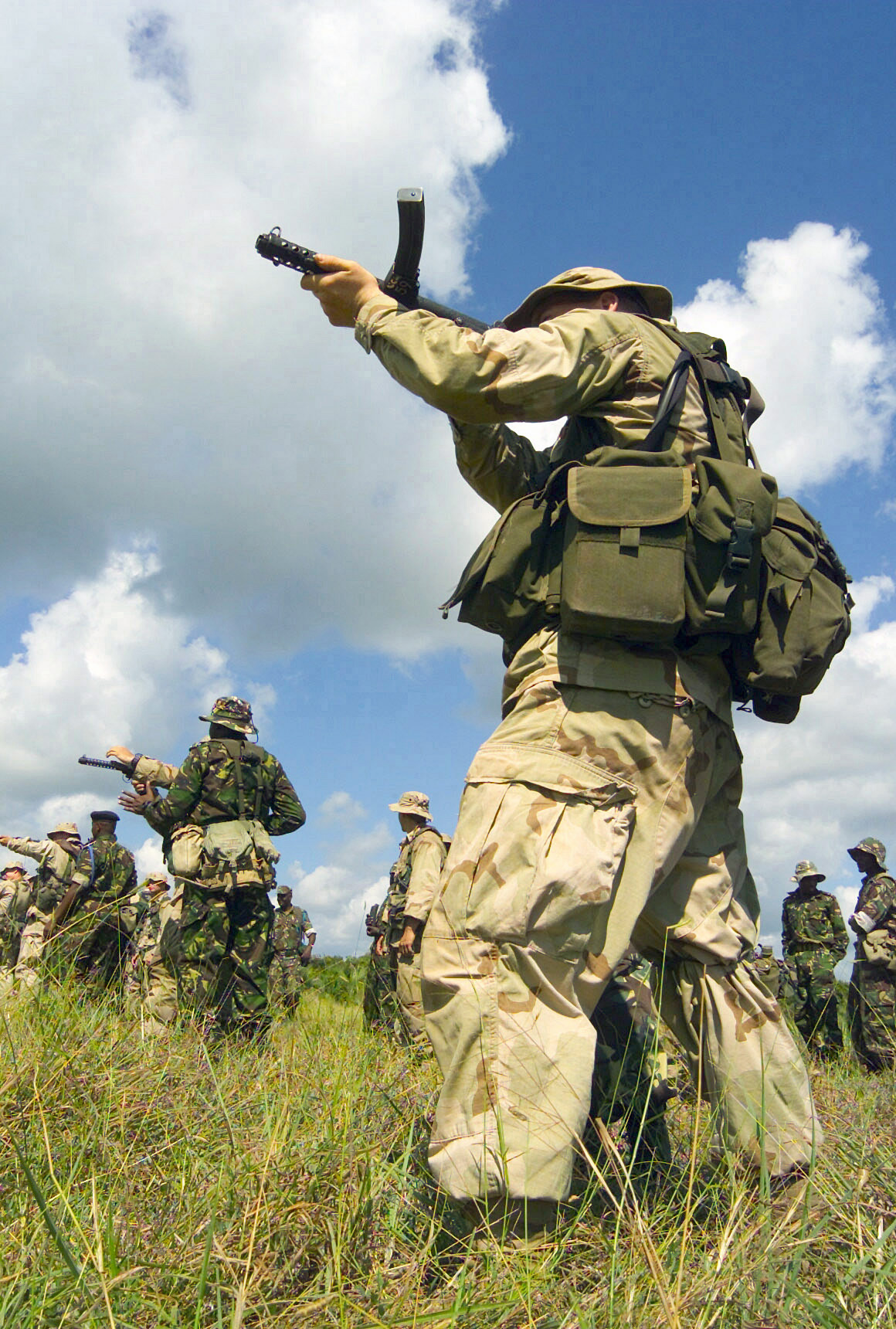
US Marines of the 2nd Marine Regiment with Kenyan-issue Sterling Mk 4s

- Argentina: Mk 4 variant and L34A1 suppressed variant.
- Australia: Mk 4 (trials) and L34A1 suppressed variant.
- Austria: L34A1 suppressed variant, used by Jagdkommando special forces only.
- Bahrain: Mk 3 variant, trials only and Mk 4 variants.
- Bangladesh: Mk 4 variant.
- Barbados
- Belize: Mk 4 variant.
- Botswana
- Brazil: Mk 3 variant, trials only
- Brunei: Mk 4 variant.
- Canada: Produced as the C1.
- Cuba: Mk 3 variant, trials only
- Cyprus
- Egypt: Mk 3 variant
- Eswatini
- France: Mk 3 variant, trials only
- Gabon
- Gambia
- Ghana
- Guyana
- Hong Kong: L2A variant. Used by the Royal Hong Kong Regiment.
- India: 32,536 Mk 4 weapons were delivered. The Indian Ordnance Factories manufactured the 1A1/2A1 version under licence until 2010. Currently all remaining weapons are being replaced.
- Iran: Replaced by MP5 Submachine Gun.
- Iraq: Mk 4 variant. Around 13,241 Mk 4s made and sold to Iraq.
- Jamaica: Used by the Jamaica Defence Force as a personal defence weapon for auxiliary units.
- Kenya
- Kingdom of Laos: Mk 3 variant, trials only
- Kuwait: L2A3 variant
- Lebanon: Mk 3 variant and L34A1 suppressed variant used by the Lebanese Commando Regiment.
- Lesotho
- Libya: Mk 2 and L34 variants and Indian-made 1A1
- Malawi
- Malaysia: at least 18,500 Mk 4 bought
- Malta
- Morocco
- Myanmar
- Nepal
- New Zealand
- Nigeria
- North Korea
- Oman
- Papua New Guinea
- Philippines: L34A1s used by Naval Special Warfare Group.
- Portugal
- Qatar
- Rhodesia
- Saudi Arabia
- Sierra Leone
- Singapore: Mk 3 variant ordered for trials. Mk 4 variant used by Singapore Police Force's paramilitary units—Gurkha Contingent, Police Coast Guard and Police Special Operations Command; replaced by the Heckler & Koch MP5 since 1999.
- Solomon Islands
- Somalia
- South Africa: Mk 3 variant, trials only
- Spain: UOE special group of the Spanish Navy.
- Sri Lanka
- Sudan
- Sweden: Mk 3 variant, trials only
- Tanzania
- Tunisia
- Trinidad and Tobago
- Uganda
- United Kingdom: L2A1 variant was accepted by the British Army in 1953. L34A1 variant entered service in 1966. Mk 3 variant used by the Royal Ulster Constabulary from 1971 to 1992.
- United States: Suppressed variants used by Military Assistance Command, Vietnam – Studies and Observations Group.
- West Germany: Mk 3 and Mk 4 variants, trials only
- Vanuatu
- Zambia
- Zimbabwe

=== Non-state users ===
- National Liberation Front of Angola (FNLA)
- Lebanese Forces
- The Ulster Volunteer Force used Sterling copies made from captured submachine guns and spare parts.

== See also ==
- CETME C2 submachine gun
- F1 submachine gun
- Lanchester submachine gun
- E-11 blaster rifle, a prop from the Star Wars film universe based on the Sterling frame
