= Lanchester submachine gun =

Lanchester
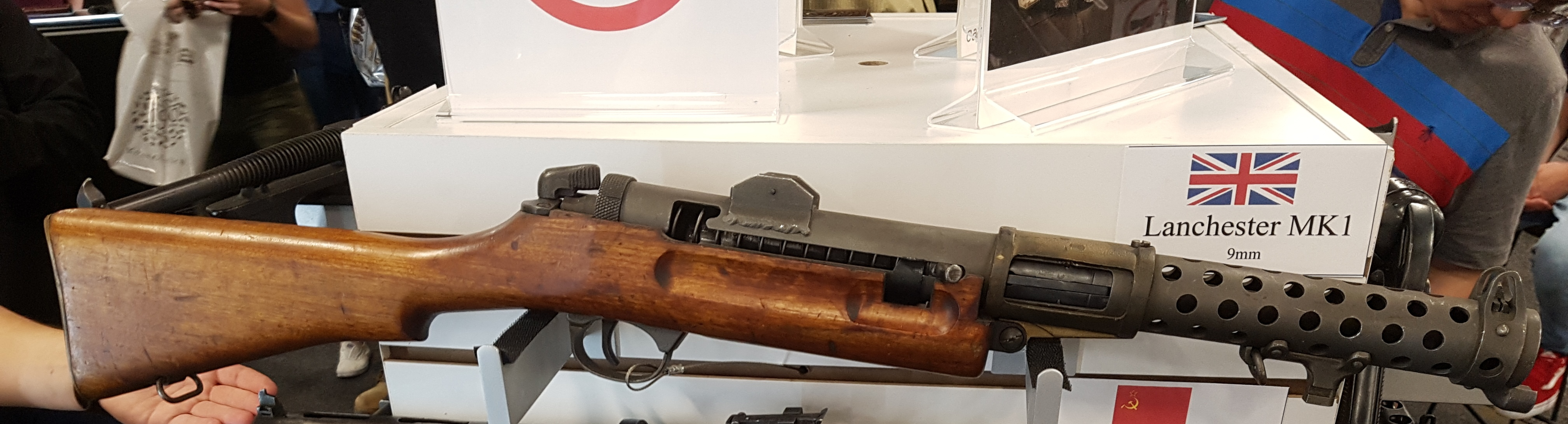
- Lanchester Mk.1
- Type: Submachine gun
- Place of origin: United Kingdom

Service history
- In service: 1941–1960
- Used by: See Users
- Wars: World War II; Indonesian National Revolution; First Indochina War; Malayan Emergency; Mau Mau rebellion Rhodesian Bush War; Suez Crisis; Dominican Civil War; Nigerian Civil War; Gaza war

Production history
- Designer: George Lanchester
- Designed: 1940
- Manufacturer: Sterling Armaments Company
- Produced: 1941–1943
- No. built: 81,000
- Variants: Mk.I, Mk.I*

Specifications
- Mass: 9.57 lb (4.3 kg)
- Length: 33.5 in (850.9 mm)
- Barrel length: 8 in (203.2 mm)
- Cartridge: 9×19mm Parabellum
- Action: Blowback, Open bolt
- Rate of fire: 600 round/min
- Muzzle velocity: 1,245 ft/s (379 m/s)
- Effective firing range: 150 m (490 ft)
- Feed system: 32- or 50-round detachable box magazine
- Sights: Front blade; rear adjustable

The Lanchester is a submachine gun ("machine carbine") assembled by the Sterling Armament Company, W. W. Greener and Boss & Co between 1941 and 1945. It is an evolution of the MP28/II and was manufactured in three versions, the MkI, MkI* and the MkI**. The MkI had an adjustable tangent sight, the MkI* had a two position flip sight and the MkI** was the MkI* but fitted with a bolt safety stop fitted from 1944. It was primarily used by the Royal Navy during the Second World War, and to a lesser extent by the Royal Air Force Regiment for use in their training facilities. It was given the general designation of Lanchester after George Lanchester, who was charged with producing the weapon at the Sterling Armament Company.

== History ==
Following the Dunkirk evacuation in 1940, the Royal Air Force decided it required a submachine gun for airfield defence. The Sterling Armament Company had demonstrated an MP28 which they held the licence to manufacture, to the Air Ministry and the Royal Navy in 1939. The British Admiralty decided to join with the RAF in adopting the new weapon and played a key role in its design, mainly in insisting on the inclusion of a bayonet fitting. Ultimately, it was within the Royal Navy that most of the Lanchesters that were produced went into service.

It was given the general designation of Lanchester after George Herbert Lanchester, who was charged with producing the weapon at the Sterling Armaments Company, the same company that later produced the Sterling submachine gun.

The Lanchester was envisioned as a weapon used for guarding prisoners and accompanying naval landing and assault parties. It was a very solid, well-made submachine gun utilising parts made by over 40 different contractors, assembled into complete guns by the three assembling companies. It was a similar process that enabled the simpler Sten to be rushed in to production so quickly.

The Lanchester had a wooden butt and stock, which was for simplicity and familiarisation in training copied from the British No4 MkI Lee Enfield rifle, a machined-steel action and breech block, a magazine housing made from bronze and a mounting on the muzzle for use of a long-bladed No1 MkI 1907 bayonet. The rifling differed from the German original in order to speed up production, dropping the 6 grooves to 2 grooves.

Produced in three versions, MkI and MkI* and MkI**. The Mk.I* was a simplified version of the original MkI, which used a simplified two position flip sight. The MkI** was the same as the MkI* but fitted with a sliding steel bolt safety that locked the bolt in the forward position.

== Production ==
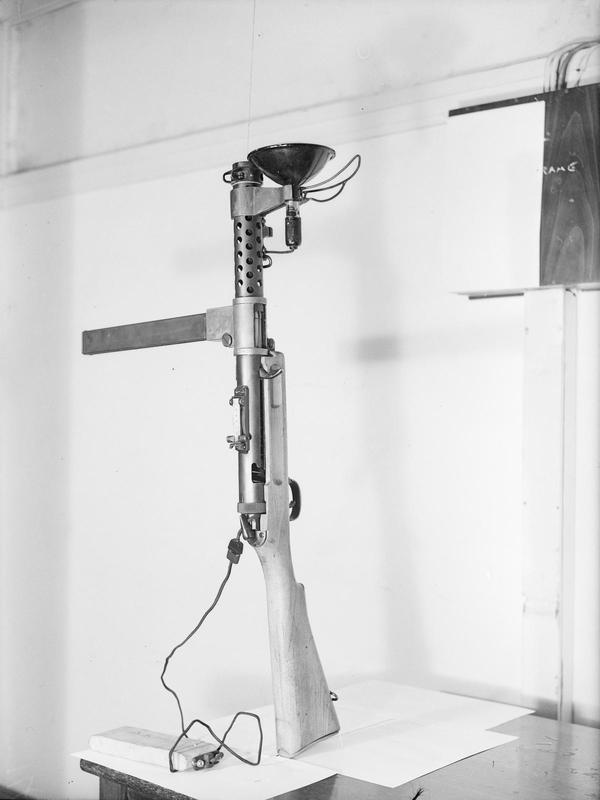
A Lanchester gun fitted with an early version of a tactical light in a Royal Navy experiment from 1943.

The first contract of 16 June 1941 produced an initial 20,000 Lanchesters that were originally to be split 50/50 between the Royal Navy and the Air Ministry. The British Army had supplies of the expensive US-produced Thompson SMG, whereas the Air Ministry, desperate for automatic weapons for air field defence had chosen to instead test the S&W Model 1940 Light Rifle (also US-produced, chambered in 9mm), which was hoped could be delivered sooner than the Lanchesters. These were never delivered following issues with the sears so the Air Ministry adopted the Sten which was by now in full production.

The final contract was issued on 14 October 1943. Production would finally be completed in 1945 with Boss & Co producing the last MkI** Lanchesters. In total 81,000 Lanchesters would be contracted from the three assembly plants.

There were three Lanchester assembly plants. Sterling assembly of the Lanchester was completed at their factory at the Kingsthorpe Road in Northampton (wartime code M619) taken over for the duration of the war from Clarke & Sherwell Limited.

Quantities produced:

- Sterling (code M619) - 59,000.
- Greener (code M94) - 18,000.
- Boss (code S156) - 4000.

Makers codes weren't applied to guns until the start of 1943. MkI Sterling guns were marked "SA" for Sterling Armament". Some MkI guns were marked with a "A" suffix after the serial number denoting some parts were not interchangeable. This was due to a lack of gauges being available at Sterling so they couldn't guarantee parts interchangeability.

== Markings ==
The year of manufacture of any particular Lanchester can be found stamped in small almost indistinguishable numbers next to the crossed flags military proof mark on the top of the rearmost magazine housing flange.

Sterling-made MkI Lanchester guns are marked on top of the magazine housing as follows:

- LANCHESTER
- MK.I
- SA.
- XXXX

("SA" stands for Sterling Armament)

== Operation ==
The Lanchester is an open-bolt, self-loading blowback-operated weapon with a selective-fire option only fitted on pre-production prototypes. Production guns were never fitted with a selector and were all fully automatic only. A tubular receiver was attached to the front of the wooden stock, which could be pivoted barrel down for maintenance and disassembly. The wooden stock was patterned after that of the No4 MkI Lee–Enfield rifle, and a bayonet lug centred below the muzzle accepted the Pattern 1907 sword-bayonet as used on the Lee–Enfield No. 1 Mk. III* (previously called the S.M.L.E.)

It used a straight 50-round magazine containing 9×19mm Parabellum cartridges (special pouches were produced to hold three magazines each) which fit into the magazine housing from the left, with spent cartridges ejected on the right. It was interchangeable with the shorter 32-round Sten magazine, originally designed for the Lanchester. A magazine loading tool was needed to load both 32- and 50-round magazines more easily. One of the two magazine pouches had a special pocket on the front for this loader.

MkI guns featured a front blade sight with adjustable tangent rifle-type sights, marked between 100 and 600 yards. MkI* and MkI** guns featured a much simplified flip-up sight marked 100 or 200 yards.

Manual safety is made in the form of locking cut, made in the receiver, which engages the bolt handle to lock bolt in open (cocked) position. By 1944 a simple sliding sheet steel bolt stop was being fitted to guns that prevented the bolt being jolting backwards, potentially discharging a round. Like every blow back gun it was susceptible to accidental discharge if the weapon were dropped. For cleaning, the weapon had a brass oiler bottle and pull through held inside the butt stock (similar to the Lee–Enfield rifle) and also a clearing rod was later fitted in the butt.

== Service ==
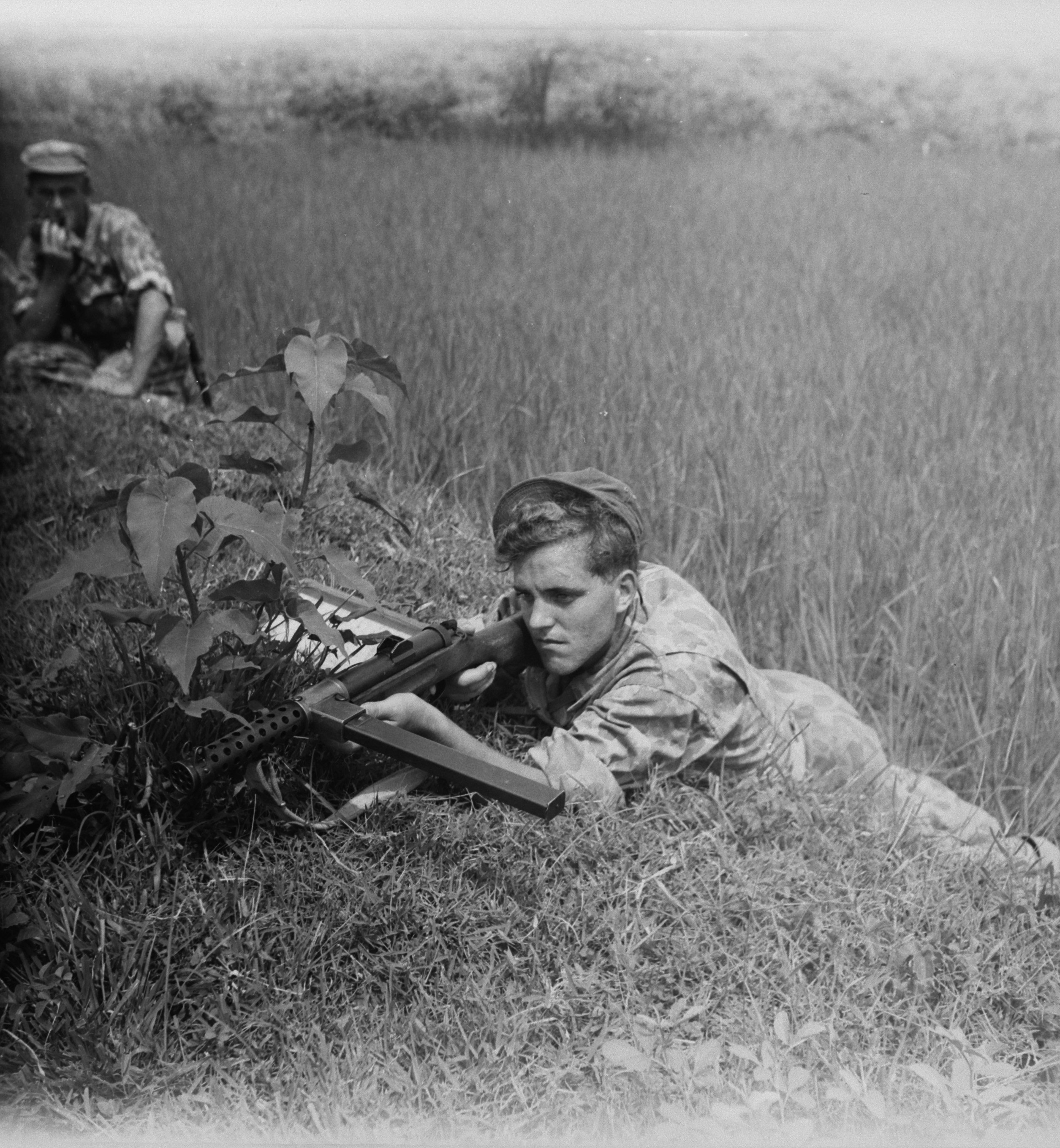
Dutch soldier deployed to Indonesia with Lanchester SMG, 1947.

The Lanchester was in service with the Royal Navy, Royal Canadian Navy and other Empire navies throughout the war and for some decades after. The last examples left Royal Naval service in the 1970s and are now collector's items.

A large number of Lanchesters were subsequently sold off to foreign nations. These are often marked with two broad arrows, point-to-point (appearing as a six-pointed star), stamped just before the serial number. This symbol is sometimes accompanied by the letter "S" and denotes "Sold out of Service".

During the resistance war against France, Vietnam used a number of Lanchester submachine guns, probably from captured war booty or purchased through secret channels from Thailand and Malaysia.

A number were acquired by Chile, Egypt and Argentina after purchasing former Royal Navy warships; those were often sold as "complete package" with everything aboard including the weapons locker.

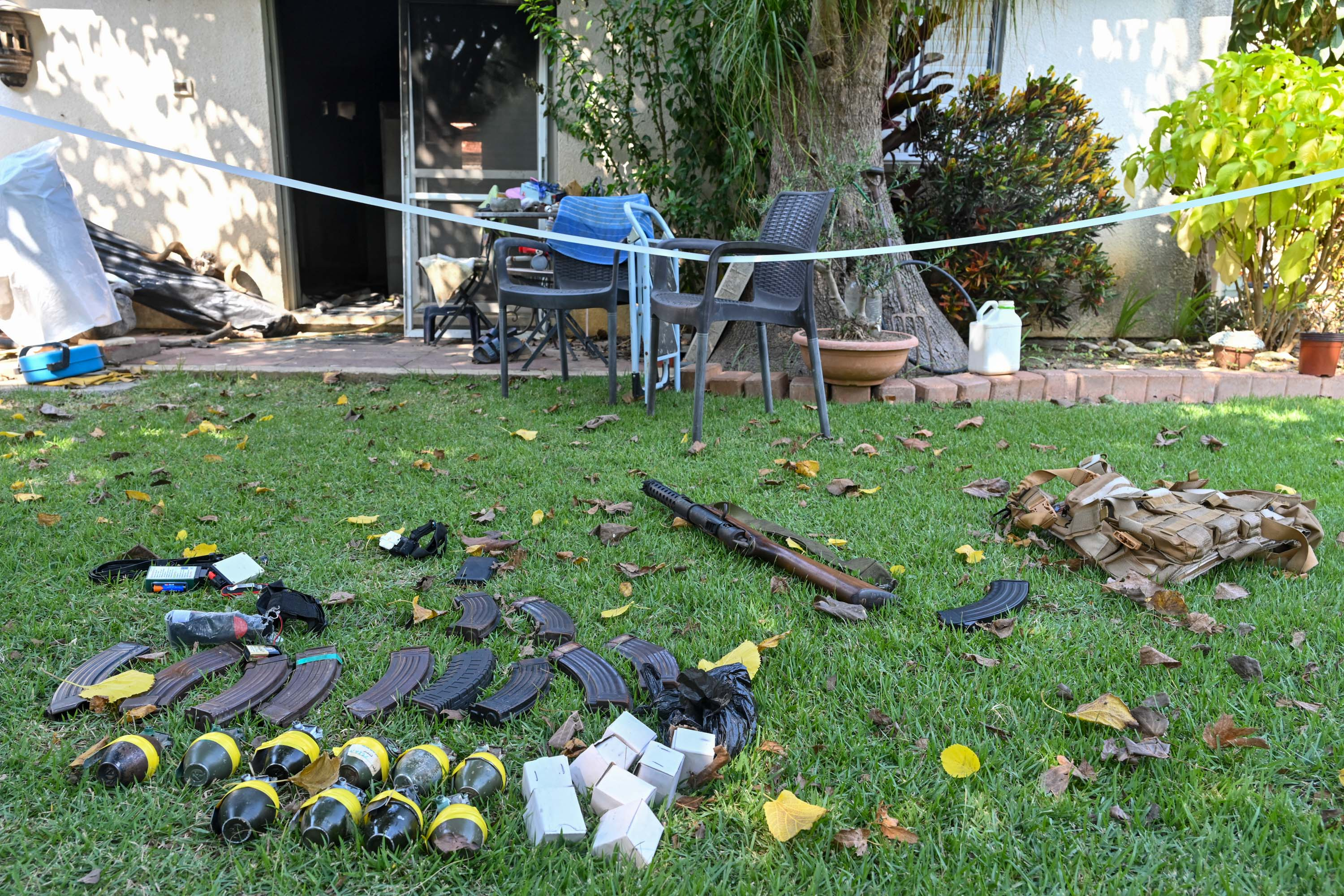
Lanchester SMG captured after the Be'eri massacre

During the Gaza war, a Lanchester was spotted in a weapons cache seized from slain Hamas fighters by the Israel Defense Forces.

== Users ==
- Argentina
- Australia
- Biafra
- Chile: In service until the 1970s
- Canada: In service with the Royal Canadian Navy until the 1960s
- Cyprus
- Dominican Republic: Bought by the Dominican Army in the 1950s; used by the Constitutionalists in the Dominican Civil War of 1965.
- Egypt: Inherited from British forces after independence; more were purchased between 1946 and 1947. Used by frontline military units until 1967. In 1969 remaining Lanchesters were transferred to the Central Security Forces; they remained in service with police until the 1980s.
- Greece Hellenic Navy
- Indonesia (captured from Dutch Forces)
- Myanmar: Retired.
- Netherlands
  - Dutch East Indies
- New Zealand
- United Kingdom
- Viet Minh
- Hamas

== See also ==
- Sten
- PPSh-41
