= Patch box =

Patch box may refer to:

- Patch box (cosmetics), a box for storing artificial beauty marks
- Patch box (firearms), a storage compartment on muzzleloader guns
- Tinderbox, or patch box, used to store flint and tinder to kindle a fire
