= Lee–Enfield =

British bolt-action rifle

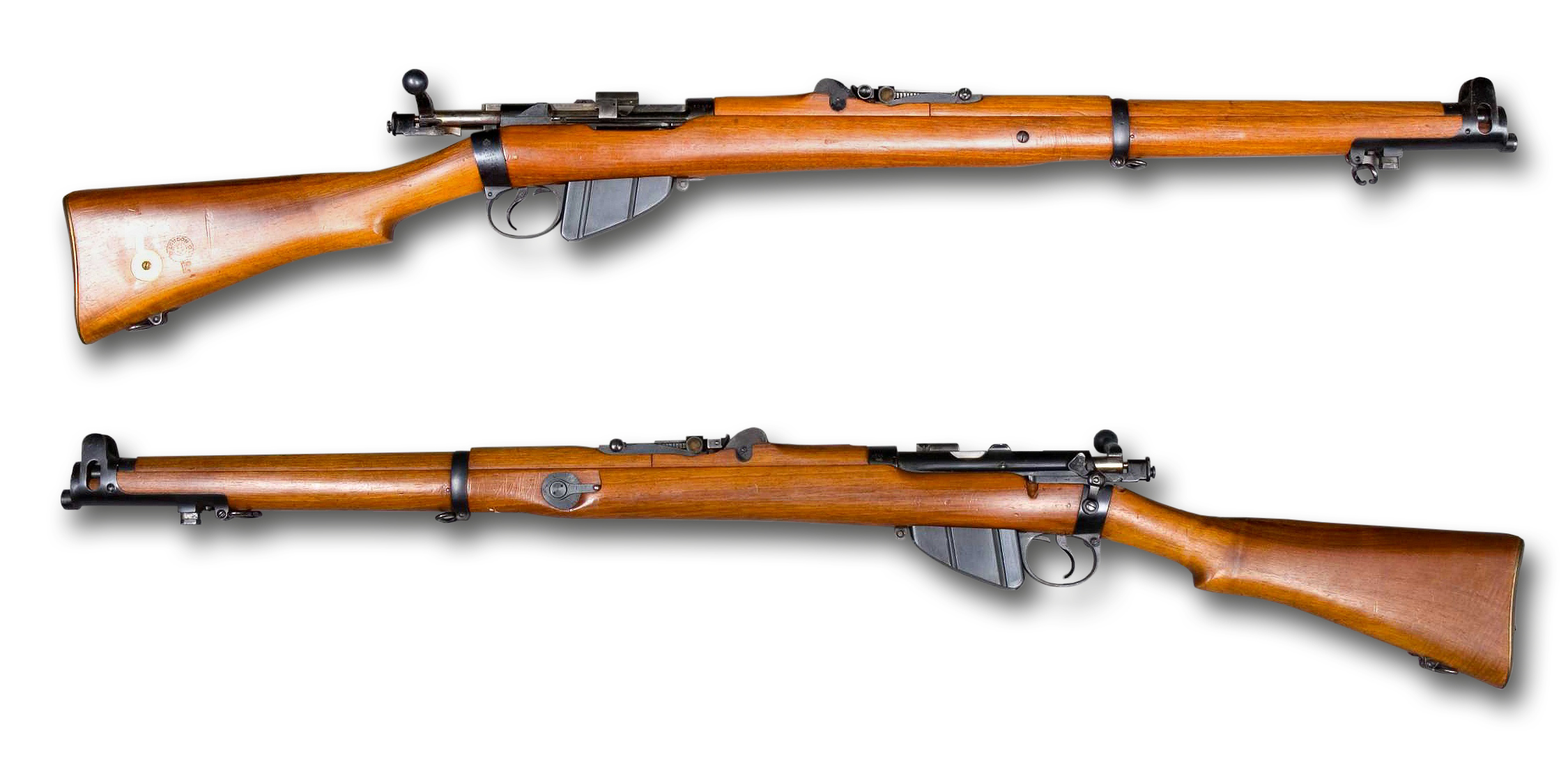
- A 1903 Short Magazine Lee–Enfield Mk I in the Swedish Army Museum
- Type: Bolt-action rifle
- Place of origin: United Kingdom

Service history
- In service: 1895–1957 (as the standard British service rifle)
- Used by: See Users
- Wars: List: Second Boer War; World War I; Easter Rising; Various colonial conflicts; Polish-Soviet War; Jallianwala Bagh Massacre; Irish War of Independence; Irish Civil War; Constitutionalist Revolution(Limited); Spanish Civil War; World War II; Indonesian National Revolution; Indo-Pakistani Wars; Greek Civil War; Malayan Emergency; French Indochina War; Korean War; 1948 Arab–Israeli War; Border Campaign (Irish Republican Army); Mau Mau Uprising; Suez Crisis; Algerian War; 1958 Lebanon crisis; 1959 Tibetan uprising; Annexation of Goa; Portuguese Colonial War; Congo Crisis; Communist insurgency in Thailand; Battle of Mengo Hill; Nathu La and Cho La clashes; Nigerian Civil War; Vietnam War; Rhodesian Bush War; Cypriot intercommunal violence; The Troubles; Sino-Indian War; Dhofar Rebellion; Zanzibar Revolution; Chadian Civil War; Bangladesh Liberation War; Turkish invasion of Cyprus; Uganda–Tanzania War; Lebanese Civil War; Soviet–Afghan War; Nepalese Civil War; War in Afghanistan (2001–2021); Mumbai Attack; Iraq War; Myanmar Civil War

Production history
- Designer: James Paris Lee
- Manufacturer: Royal Small Arms Factory; Birmingham Small Arms Company; Lithgow Small Arms Factory; London Small Arms Co. Ltd; Pakistan Ordnance Factories; Rifle Factory Ishapore; ROF Fazakerley; ROF Maltby; Savage Arms
- Produced: MLE: 1895–1904; SMLE: 1904–1957
- No. built: 17,000,000+
- Variants: See Models/marks

Specifications
- Mass: 9.24 lb (4.19 kg) (Mk I); 8.73 lb (3.96 kg) (Mk III); 9.06 lb (4.11 kg) (No. 4)
- Length: MLE: 49.6 in (1,260 mm); SMLE No. 1 Mk III: 44.57 in (1,132 mm); Rifle No. 4 Mk I: 44.45 in (1,129 mm); LEC: 40.6 in (1,030 mm); Rifle No. 5 Mk I: 39.5 in (1,003 mm)
- Barrel length: MLE: 30.2 in (767 mm); SMLE No. 1 Mk III: 25.2 in (640 mm); Rifle No. 4 Mk I: 25.2 in (640 mm); LEC: 21.2 in (540 mm); Rifle No. 5 Mk I: 18.8 in (480 mm)
- Cartridge: .303 British; 7.92×57mm Mauser (Ottoman Empire conversions); 7.62×51mm NATO (For L8 rifles, the L42A1 and some No. 4s only); 7×57mm Mauser (BSA firearms catalog 1912).375 Flanged Nitro Express (BSA firearms catalog 1912); 8×50mmR Mannlicher (BSA firearms catalog 1912)
- Action: Bolt-action
- Rate of fire: 20–30 aimed shots per minute
- Muzzle velocity: 2,441 ft/s (744 m/s)
- Effective firing range: 550 yd (503 m)
- Maximum firing range: 3,000 yd (2,743 m)
- Feed system: 10-round box magazine, loaded with 5-round charger clips (excluding MLE)
- Sights: Sliding ramp rear sights, fixed-post front sights, "dial" long-range volley; telescopic sights on sniper models. Fixed and adjustable aperture sights were incorporated onto later variants

The Lee–Enfield is a bolt-action, magazine-fed repeating rifle that served as the main firearm of the military forces of the British Empire and Commonwealth during the first half of the 20th century, and was the standard service rifle of the British Armed Forces from its official adoption in 1895 until 1957.

A redesign of the Lee–Metford (adopted by the British Army in 1888), the Lee–Enfield superseded it and the earlier Martini–Henry and Martini–Enfield rifles. It featured a ten-round box magazine which was loaded with the .303 British cartridge manually from the top, either one round at a time or by means of five-round chargers. The Lee–Enfield was the standard-issue weapon to rifle companies of the British Army, colonial armies (such as India and parts of Africa), and other Commonwealth nations in both the First and Second World Wars (such as Australia, New Zealand, South Africa, and Canada). Although officially replaced in the United Kingdom with the L1A1 SLR in 1957, it remained in widespread British service until the early/mid-1960s and the 7.62 mm L42A1 sniper variant remained in service until the 1990s. As a standard-issue infantry rifle, it is still found in service in the armed forces of some Commonwealth nations, notably with the Bangladesh Police, which makes it the second longest-serving military bolt-action rifle still in official service, after the Mosin–Nagant (Mosin-Nagant receivers are used in the Finnish 7.62 Tkiv 85). Total production of all Lee–Enfields is estimated at over 17 million rifles.

The Lee–Enfield takes its name from the designer of the rifle's bolt system—James Paris Lee—and the location where its rifling design was created—the Royal Small Arms Factory in Enfield.

== Design and history ==
The Lee–Enfield rifle was derived from the earlier Lee–Metford, a mechanically similar black-powder rifle, which combined James Paris Lee's rear-locking bolt system that had a barrel featuring rifling designed by William Ellis Metford. The bolt has a relatively short bolt throw and features rear-mounted lugs, and the bolt operating handle places the bolt knob just rearwards of the trigger at a favourable ergonomic position close to the operator's hand. The action features helical locking surfaces (the technical term is interrupted threading). This means that the final headspace is not achieved until the bolt handle is turned down all the way. Helical locking lugs were probably used both to allow the chambering of imperfect or dirty ammunition and also so that the closing cam action is distributed over the entire mating faces of both bolt and receiver lugs. This is one reason the bolt closure feels smooth. The rifle was also equipped with a detachable sheet-steel, 10-round, double-column magazine, a very modern development in its day. Originally, the concept of a detachable magazine was opposed in some British Army circles, as some feared that the private soldier might be likely to lose the magazine during field campaigns. Early models of the Lee–Metford and Lee–Enfield even used a short length of chain to secure the magazine to the rifle. To further facilitate rapid aimed fire, the rifle can be cycled by most riflemen without loss of sight picture.

These design features facilitate rapid cycling and fire compared to other bolt-action designs like the Mauser. The Lee bolt-action and 10-round magazine capacity enabled a well-trained rifleman to perform the "mad minute" firing 20 to 30 aimed rounds in 60 seconds, making the Lee–Enfield the fastest military bolt-action rifle of the day. The current world record for aimed bolt-action fire was set in 1914 by a musketry instructor in the British Army—Sergeant Instructor Snoxall—who placed 38 rounds into a 12-inch-wide (300 mm) target at 300 yards (270 m) in one minute. Some straight-pull bolt-action rifles were thought faster but lacked the simplicity, reliability, and generous magazine capacity of the Lee–Enfield. Several First World War accounts tell of British troops repelling German attackers who subsequently reported that they had encountered machine guns, when in fact it was simply a group of well-trained riflemen armed with SMLE Mk III rifles.

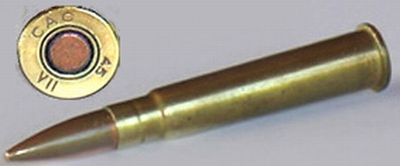
Standard Mk VII .303-inch cartridge for Lee–Enfield rifle

The Lee–Enfield was adapted to fire the .303 British service cartridge, a rimmed, high-powered rifle round. Experiments with smokeless powder in the existing Lee–Metford cartridge seemed at first to be a simple upgrade, but the greater heat and pressure generated by the new smokeless powder wore away the shallow and rounded Metford rifling after approximately 6,000 rounds. Replacing this with a new square-shaped rifling system designed at the Royal Small Arms Factory (RSAF) Enfield solved the problem, and the Lee–Enfield was born.

=== Models/marks of Lee–Enfield rifle and service periods ===
Model/Mark	In service
Magazine Lee–Enfield	1895–1926
Charger loading Lee–Enfield	1906–1926
Short Magazine Lee–Enfield Mk I	1904–1926
Short Magazine Lee–Enfield Mk II	1906–1927
Short Magazine Lee–Enfield Mk III	1907–present
Short Magazine Lee–Enfield Mk III*	1916–present
Short Magazine Lee–Enfield Mk V	1922–1924 (trials only; 20,000 produced)
Rifle No. 1 Mk VI	1930 (trials only; 1,025 produced and leftover parts assembled into rifles early in WWII)
Rifle No. 4 Mk I	1931–present (2,500 trials examples produced in the 1930s, then mass production from mid-1941 onwards)
Rifle No. 4 Mk I*	1942–present
Rifle No. 5 Mk I "jungle carbine"	1944–present (produced 1944–1947) BSA-Shirley produced 81,329 rifles and ROF Fazakerley 169,807 rifles.
Rifle No. 4 Mk 2	1949–present
Rifle 7.62 mm 2A	1964–present
Rifle 7.62 mm 2A1	1965–present

== Magazine Lee–Enfield ==
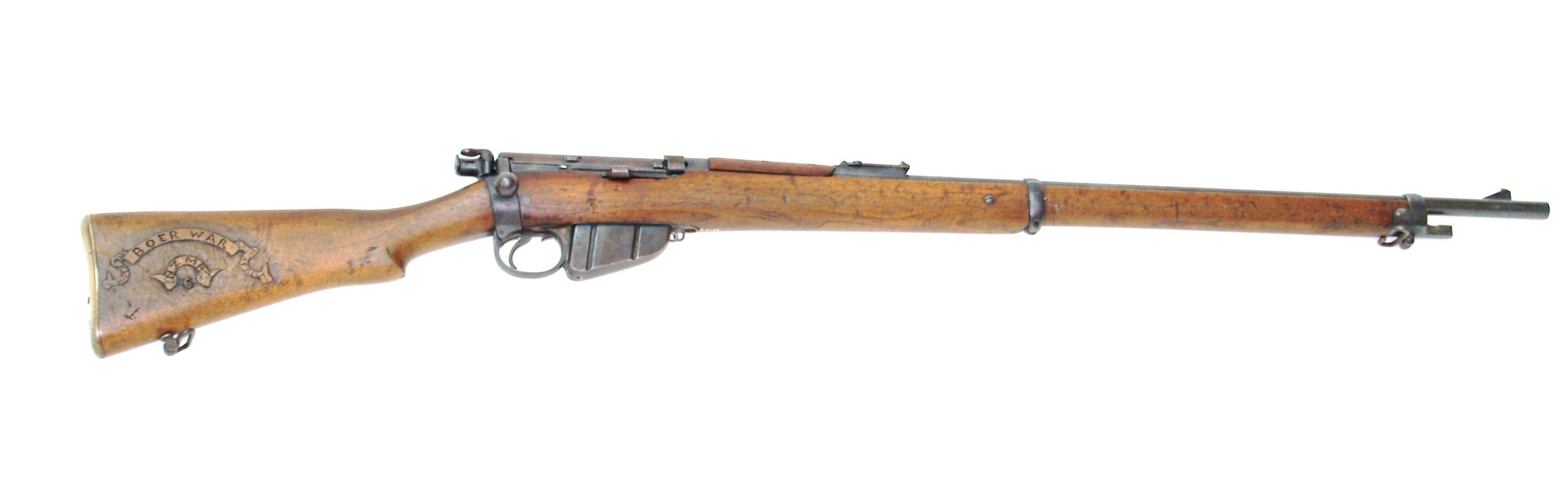
A Magazine Lee Enfield Mk I* rifle ("Long Tom"), used in the Second Boer War by the New Zealand Mounted Rifles

The Lee–Enfield rifle was introduced in November 1895 as the .303 calibre, Rifle, Magazine, Lee–Enfield, or more commonly Magazine Lee–Enfield, or MLE (sometimes spoken as "Emily" instead of M, L, E). The next year, a shorter version was introduced as the Lee–Enfield cavalry carbine Mk I, or LEC, with a 21.2-inch (540 mm) barrel as opposed to the 30.2-inch (770 mm) one in the "long" version. Both underwent a minor upgrade series in 1899 (the omission of the cleaning / clearing rod), becoming the Mk I*. Many LECs (and LMCs in smaller numbers) were converted to special patterns, namely the New Zealand carbine and the Royal Irish Constabulary carbine, or NZ and RIC carbines, respectively. Some of the MLEs (and MLMs) were converted to load from chargers, and designated Charger Loading Lee–Enfields, or CLLEs.

== Short Magazine Lee–Enfield Mk I ==
A shorter and lighter version of the original MLE—the Rifle, Short, Magazine, Lee–Enfield or SMLE (sometimes spoken as "Smelly", rather than "S-M-L-E")—was introduced on 1 January 1904. The barrel was now halfway in length between the original long rifle and the carbine, at 25.2 inches (640 mm). The SMLE's visual trademark was its blunt nose, with only the bayonet boss protruding a small fraction of an inch beyond the nosecap, being modelled on the Swedish Model 1894 cavalry carbine. The new rifle also incorporated a charger loading system, another innovation borrowed from the Mauser rifle and notably different from the fixed "bridge" that later became the standard: a charger clip (stripper clip) guide on the face of the bolt head. The shorter length was controversial at the time; many rifle association members and gunsmiths were concerned that the shorter barrel would not be as accurate as the longer MLE barrels, that the recoil would be much greater and the sighting radius would be too short.

== Short Magazine Lee–Enfield Mk III ==
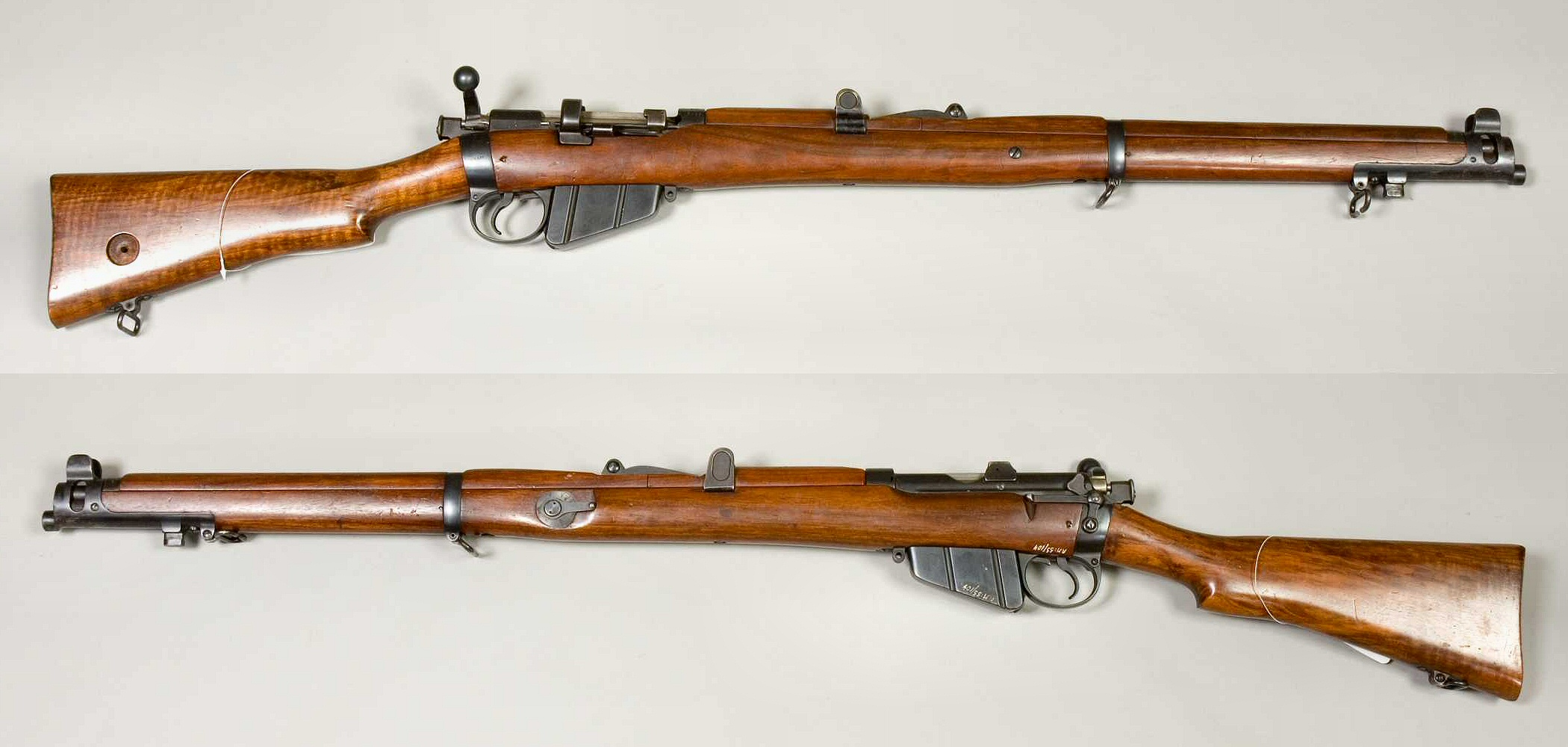
Short Magazine Lee–Enfield No. 1 Mk III

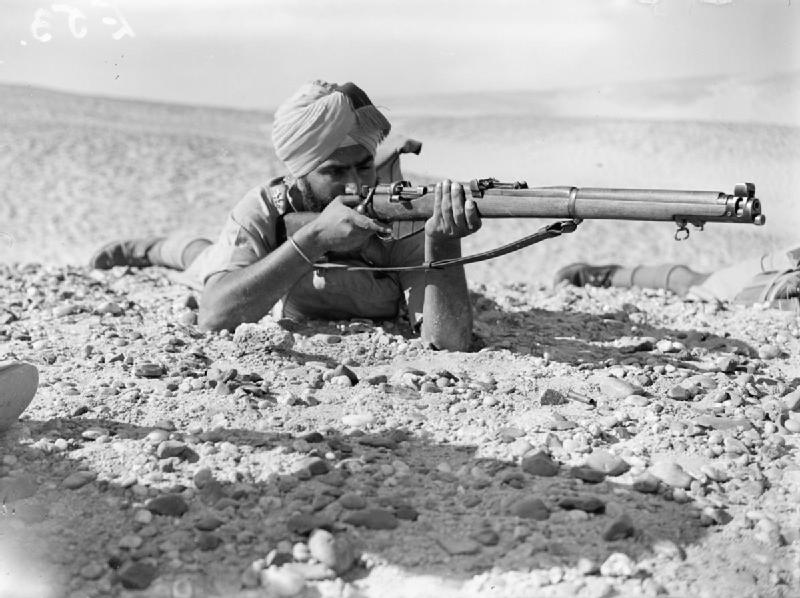
An Indian rifleman with an SMLE Mk III, Egypt, 16 May 1940

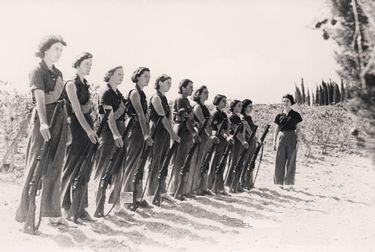
Women training at Mishmar HaEmek kibbutz with SMLE Mk IIIs during the 1948 Arab–Israeli War

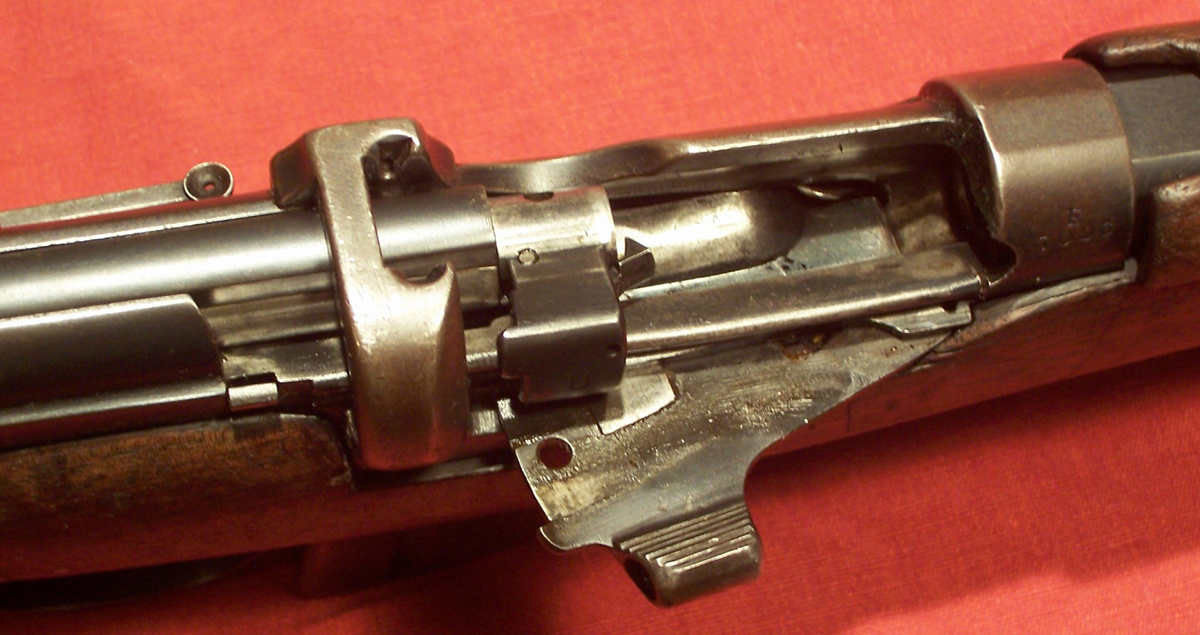
Magazine cut-off on an SMLE Mk III rifle. This feature was removed on the Mk III* rifle.

The best-known Lee–Enfield rifle, the SMLE Mk III, was introduced on 26 January 1907, along with a Pattern 1907 bayonet and featured a simplified rear sight arrangement and a fixed, rather than a bolt-head-mounted sliding, charger guide. The rear sight was of U type, the front a blade sight protected by wings. The design of the handguards and the magazine were also improved and the chamber was adapted to fire the new Mk VII high velocity spitzer .303 ammunition. Many early models, Magazine Lee–Enfields (MLEs), Magazine Lee–Metfords (MLMs) and SMLEs, were rebuilt to the Mk III standard. These are called "Mk IV Cond.", with various asterisks denoting subtypes. Another feature present on the No. 1 Mk III as well as many other models of the SMLE was a field cleaning kit enclosed behind a trapdoor in the buttstock which included a barrel pull through with various cloths and an oil bottle enclosed deeper within the compartment.

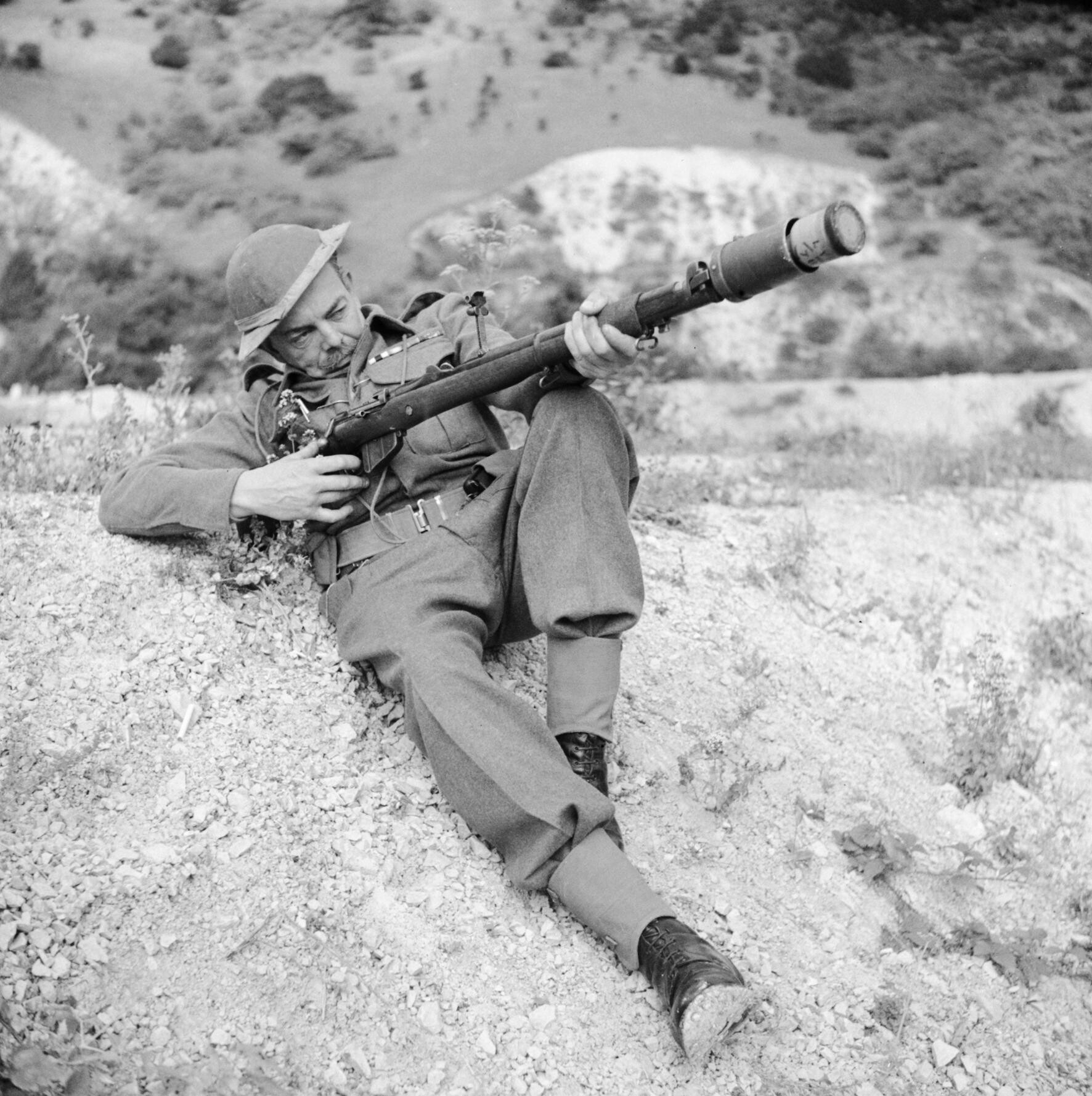
A member of the Home Guard operating an SMLE No. 1 Mk III Rifle equipped with a grenade launcher cup loaded with an Anti-Tank Grenade of the era

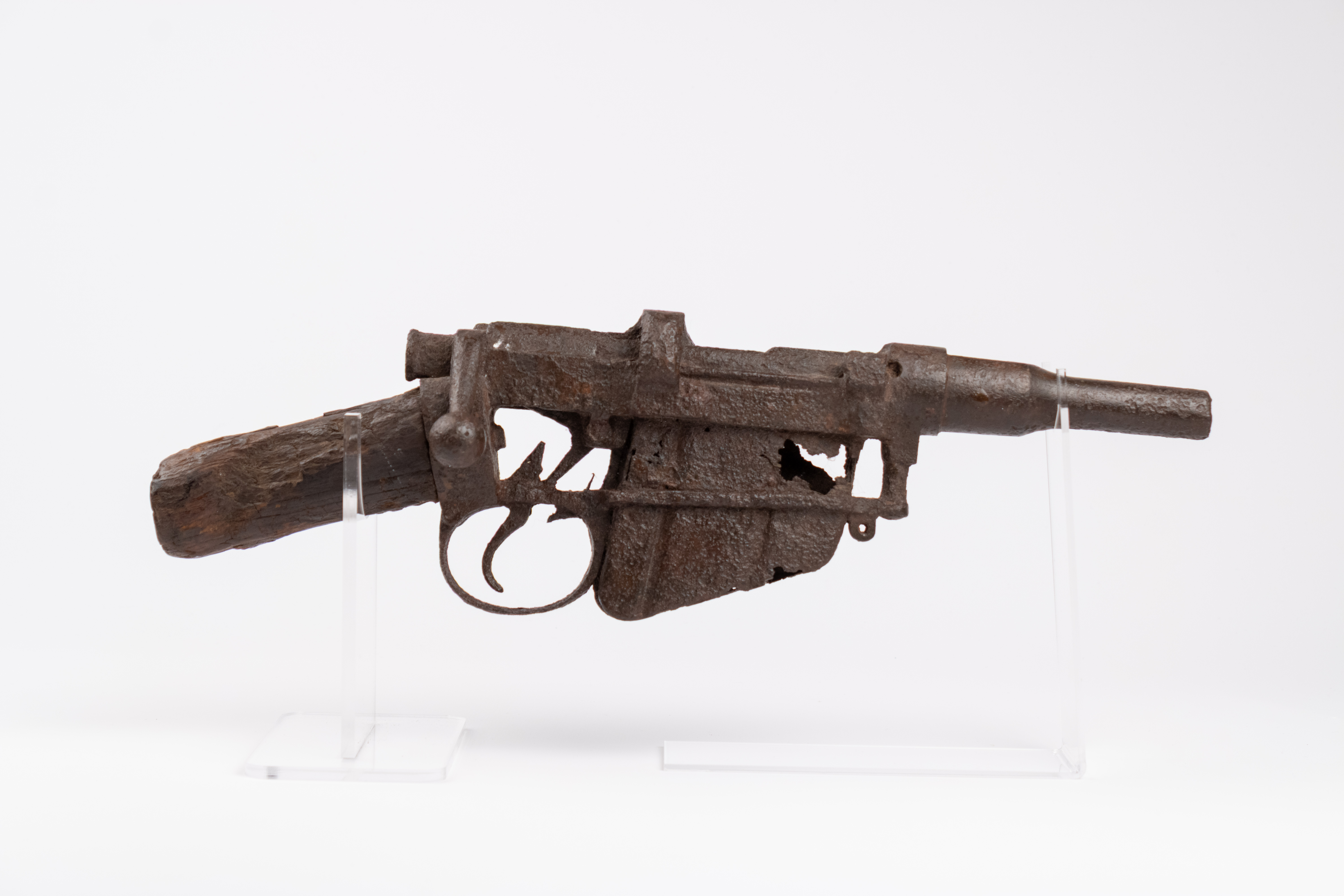
SMLE with shortened stock and barrel used during the First World War.

During the First World War, the SMLE Mk III was found to be too complicated to manufacture (an SMLE Mk III rifle cost the British government £3/15/– = £3.75), and demand outstripped supply; in late 1915 the Mk III* was introduced incorporating several changes, the most prominent of which were the deletion of the magazine cut-off mechanism, which when engaged permits the feeding and extraction of single cartridges only while keeping the cartridges in the magazine in reserve, and the long-range volley sights. The windage adjustment of the rear sight was also dispensed with, and the cocking piece was changed from a round knob to a serrated slab. Rifles with some or all of these features present are found, as the changes were implemented at different times in different factories and as stocks of parts were depleted. The magazine cut-off was reinstated after the First World War ended, and not entirely dispensed with in manufacturing until 1933; some rifles with cut-offs remained into the 1960s. One notable later use of the rifles were rifle grenade launcher conversions which involved the attachment of a removable grenade cup which would use the pressure of a blank round to launch a single modified Mills Bomb which had a launching range of about 10 to 200 yards.

The inability of the principal manufacturers (RSAF Enfield, the Birmingham Small Arms Company Limited and London Small Arms Co. Ltd, Lithgow Arms Australia) to meet military production demands led to the development of the "peddled scheme", which contracted out the production of whole rifles and rifle components to several shell companies. As a result, the production was quadrupled in the first year of the war from slightly over 100 thousands annually before the war.

SMLE production during WWI
Producer	1914 (Aug.-Dec.)	1915	1916	1917	1918	Total
Enfield	51,576	271,856	418,283	640,113	626,330	2,008,158
BSA	56,416	275,927	435,212	468,447	345,732	1,581,854
LSA	12,101	65,678	99,433	97,012	89,990	364,214
Total (UK)	120,093	613,461	852,928	1,205,572	1,062,052	3,854,106
Canada	0	2,650	33,476	82,360	0	118,486
USA	0	0	282,495	835,355	0	1,117,850
Grand total	120,093	616,111	1,168,899	2,123,287	1,062,052	5,090,442

The SMLE Mk III* (renamed Rifle No. 1 Mk III* in 1926) saw extensive service throughout the Second World War, especially in the North African, Italian, Pacific and Burmese theatres in the hands of British and Commonwealth forces. Australia and India retained and manufactured the SMLE Mk III* as their standard rifle during the conflict, and the rifle remained in Australian military service through the Korean War, until it was replaced by the L1A1 SLR in the late 1950s. The Lithgow Small Arms Factory finally ceased production of the SMLE Mk III* in 1953.

The Rifle Factory Ishapore at Ishapore in India produced the Mk III* in .303 British, and then the model 2A, with strength increased by heat treatment of the receiver and bolt to fire 7.62×51mm NATO ammunition, retaining the 2,000-yard rear sight as the metric conversion of distance was very close to the flatter trajectory of the new ammunition. The model 2|A1 changed the rear sight to 800 m, and was manufactured until at least the 1980s; a sporting rifle based on the Mk III* action remained in production.

The rifle became known simply as the "three-oh-three".

=== Pattern 1913 Enfield ===
Due to the poor performance of the .303 British cartridge during the Second Boer War from 1899 to 1902, the British attempted to replace the round and the Lee–Enfield rifle that fired it. The main deficiency of the rounds at the time was that they used heavy, round-nosed bullets that had low muzzle velocities and poor ballistic performance. The 7×57mm Mauser rounds fired from the Mauser Model 1895 rifle had a higher velocity, flatter trajectory and longer range, making them superior for the open plains of South Africa. Work on a long-range replacement cartridge began in 1910 and resulted in the .276 Enfield in 1912. A new rifle based on the Mauser design was created to fire the round, called the Pattern 1913 Enfield. Although the .276 Enfield had better ballistics, trials by British Army soldiers in 1913 revealed problems including excessive recoil, muzzle flash, barrel wear and overheating. It was hoped that a propellant with a lower burning temperature would be an improvement, but the onset of the First World War in 1914 ended development before a suitable propellant could be found. Wartime demand and the improved Mk VII loading of the .303 round caused the Lee–Enfield to be retained for service. Circa 1914 the Pattern 1913 design was modified as the Pattern 1914 Enfield, mainly to use the .303 British cartridge. This weapon was mainly produced in the United States for British forces during the First World War. Upon the US entry into that war in 1917 the weapon was further redesigned for US service as the M1917 Enfield rifle, using the .30-06 Springfield cartridge.

== Inter-war period ==
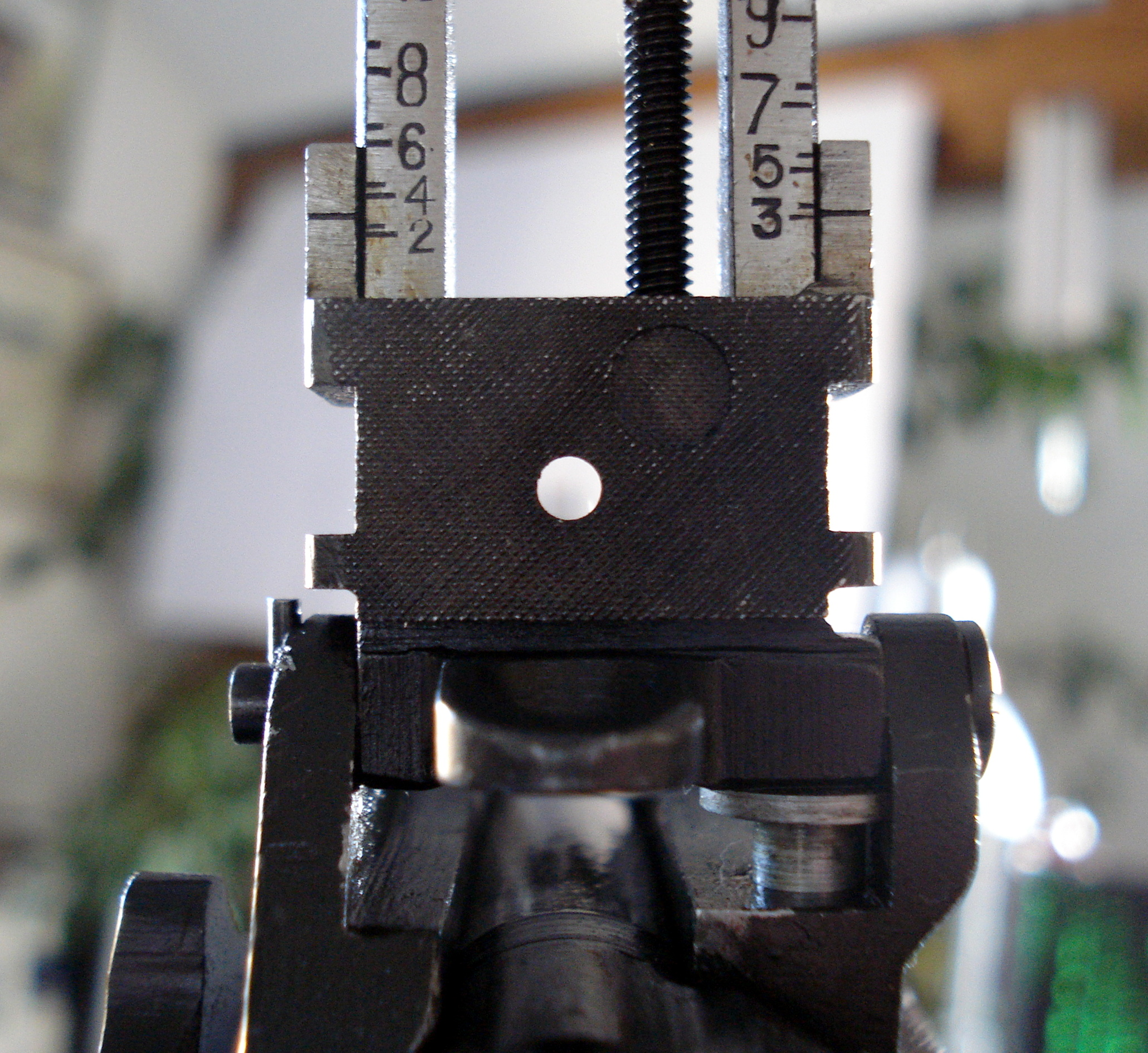
Lee–Enfield No. 4 Mk I Long Branch aperture sights

In 1926, the British Army changed its nomenclature; the SMLE became known as the Rifle No. 1 Mk III or III*, with the original MLE and LEC becoming obsolete along with the earlier SMLE models. Many Mk III and III* rifles were converted to .22 rimfire calibre training rifles, and designated Rifle No. 2, of varying marks. (The Pattern 1914 became the Rifle No. 3.)

== Lee–Enfield No. 1 Mk V ==
The SMLE design was relatively expensive to manufacture, because of the many forging and machining operations required. In the 1920s, a series of experiments were carried out to help with these problems, resulting in design changes which reduced the number of complex parts and refining manufacturing processes. The SMLE Mk V (later Rifle No. 1 Mk V), adopted a new receiver-mounted aperture sighting system, which moved the rear sight from its former position on the barrel. The increased gap resulted in an improved sighting radius, improving sighting accuracy and the aperture improved speed of sighting over various distances. In the stowed position, a fixed distance aperture battle sight calibrated for 300 yd (274 m) protruded saving further precious seconds when laying the sight to a target. An alternative developed during this period was to be used on the No. 4 variant, a "battle sight" was developed that allowed for two set distances of 300 yards and 600 yards to be quickly deployed and was cheaper to produce than the "ladder sight". The magazine cutoff was also reintroduced and an additional band was added near the muzzle for additional strength during bayonet use.

Long before the No. 4 Mk I, Britain had settled on the rear aperture sight prior to WWI, with modifications to the SMLE being tested as early as 1911, as well as later on the No. 1 Mk III pattern rifle. These unusual rifles have something of a mysterious service history, but represent a missing link in SMLE development. The primary distinguishing feature of the No. 1 Mk V is the rear aperture sight. Like the No. 1 Mk III* it lacked a volley sight and had the wire loop in place of the sling swivel at the front of the magazine well along with the simplified cocking piece. The Mk V did retain a magazine cut-off, but without a spotting hole, the piling swivel was kept attached to a forward barrel band, which was wrapped over and attached to the rear of the nose cap to reinforce the rifle for use with the standard Pattern 1907 bayonet. Other distinctive features include a nose cap screw which was slotted for the width of a coin for easy removal, a safety lever on the left side of the receiver was slightly modified with a unique angular groove pattern, and the two-piece hand guard being extended from the nose cap to the receiver, omitting the barrel mounted leaf sight. The design was found to be even more complicated and expensive to manufacture than the Mk III and was not developed or issued, beyond a trial production of about 20,000 rifles between 1922 and 1924 at RSAF Enfield all of which marked with a "V".

The No. 1 Mk VI also introduced a heavier "floating barrel" that was independent of the forearm, allowing the barrel to expand and contract without contacting the forearm and interfering with the "zero", the correlation between the alignment of the barrel and the sights. The floating barrel increased the accuracy of the rifle by allowing it to vibrate freely and consistently, whereas wooden forends in contact with barrels, if not properly fitted, affected the harmonic vibrations of the barrel. The receiver-mounted rear sights and magazine cutoff were also present and 1,025 units were produced in the 1930 period.

== Rifle No. 4 ==
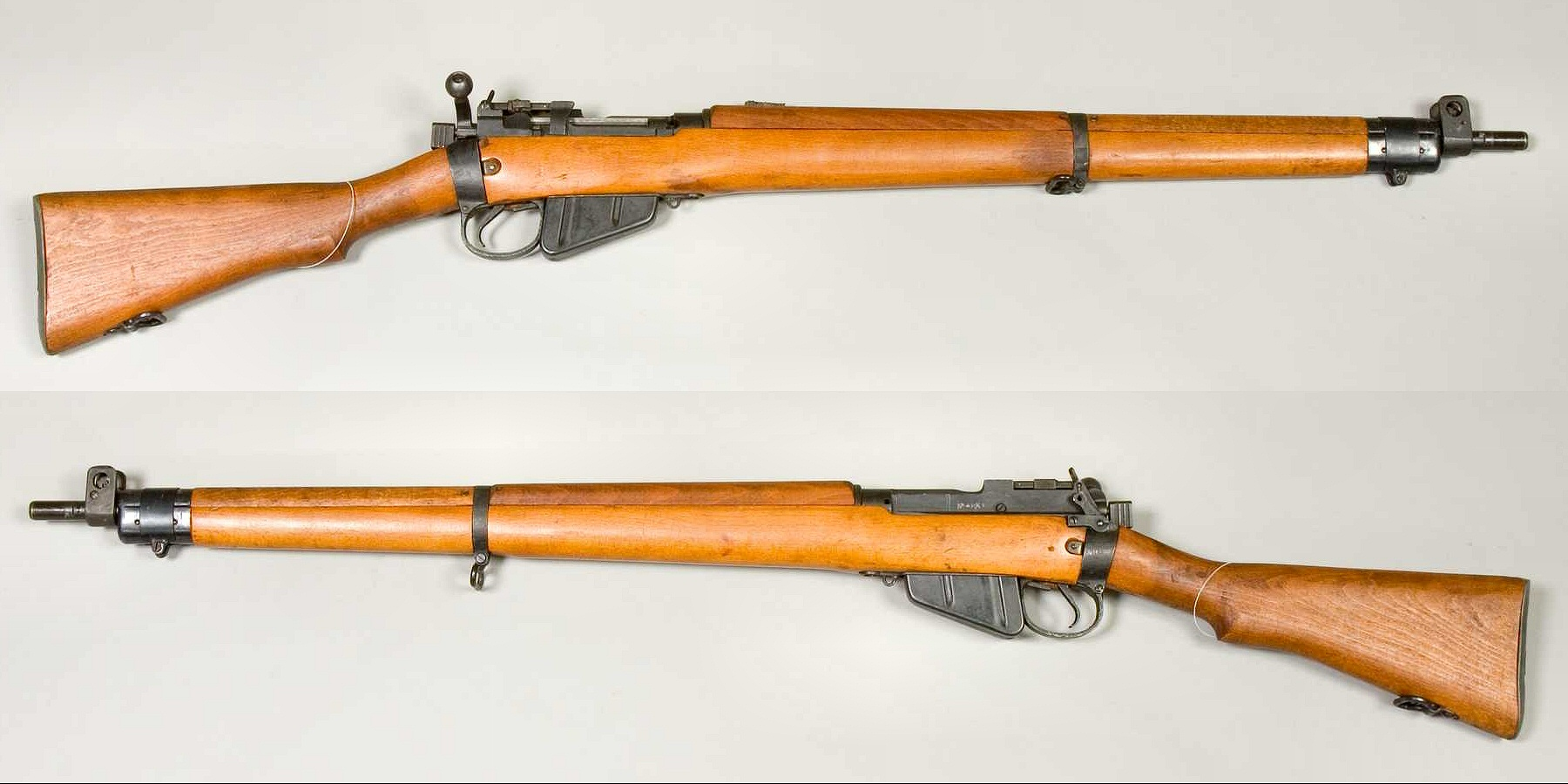
Lee–Enfield No. 4 Mk I (1943), Swedish Army Museum, Stockholm

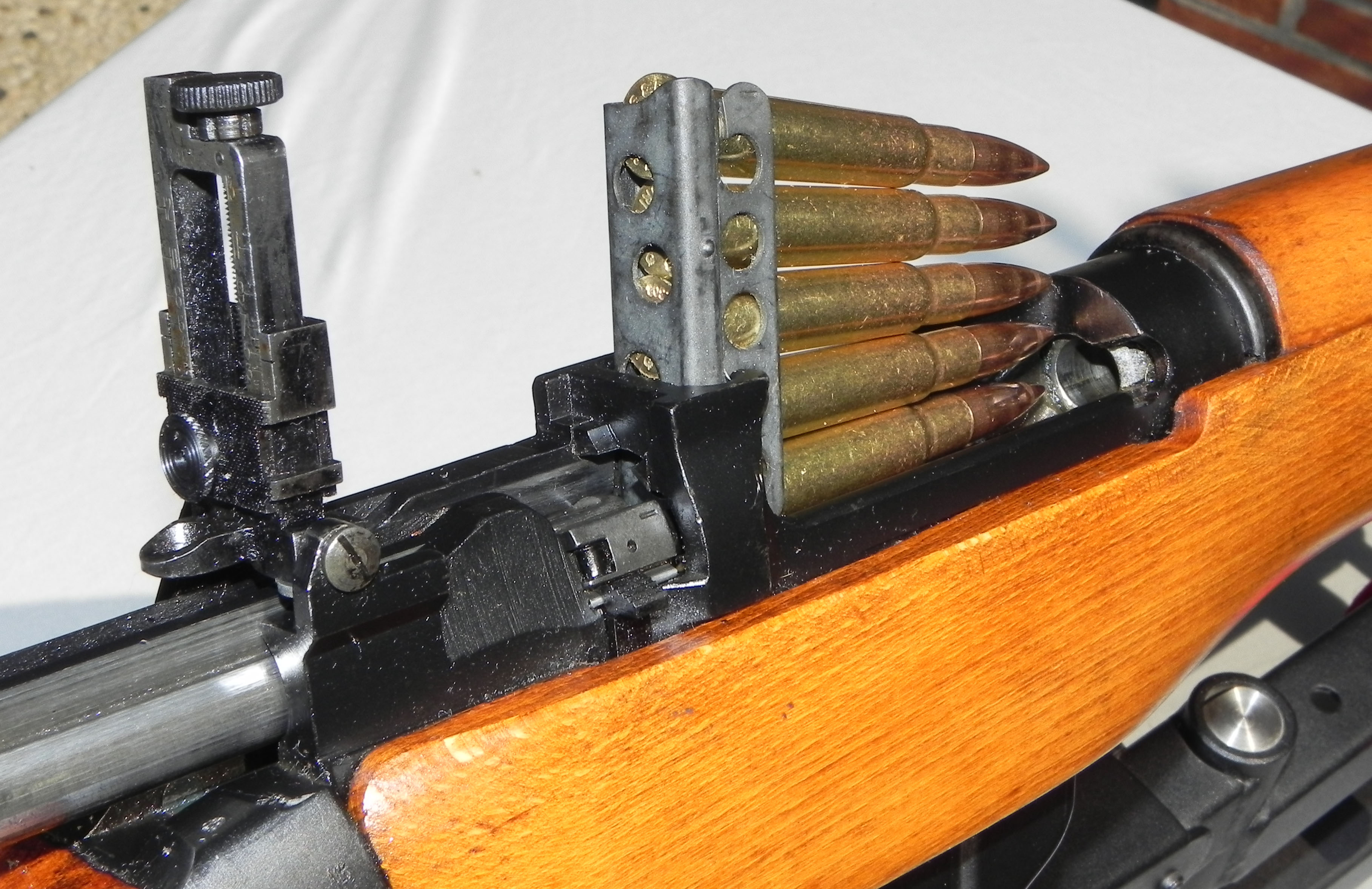
Lee–Enfield No. 4 Mk 2 with the ladder aperture sight flipped up and 5-round charger

In the early 1930s, a batch of 2,500 No. 4 Mk I rifles was made for trials. These were similar to the No. 1 Mk VI but had a flat left side and did away with the chequering on the furniture. Observed examples are dated 1931 and 1933. Roughly 1,400 of these were converted to No. 4 Mk I (T) sniper rifles in 1941–1942 at RSAF Enfield.

By the late 1930s, the need for new rifles grew and the Rifle, No. 4 Mk I was officially adopted in 1941. The No. 4 action was similar to the No. 1 Mk VI but stronger and easier to mass-produce. Unlike the SMLE, that had a nose cap, the No 4 Lee–Enfield barrel protruded from the end of the forestock. For easier machining, the charger bridge was no longer rounded. The iron sight line was redesigned and featured a rear receiver aperture battle sight calibrated for 300 yd (274 m) with an additional ladder aperture sight that could be flipped up and was calibrated for 200–1,300 yd (183–1,189 m) in 100 yd (91 m) increments. This sight, like other aperture sights, proved to be faster and more accurate than the typical mid-barrel open rear sight elements sight lines offered by Mauser, previous Lee–Enfields or the Buffington battle sight of the M1903 Springfield.

The No. 4 rifle was heavier than the No. 1 Mk III, largely due to its heavier barrel. A new bayonet was designed to go with the rifle: a spike bayonet the No. 4 bayonet, essentially a steel rod with a sharp point, nicknamed "pigsticker" by soldiers. Towards the end of the Second World War, a bladed bayonet was developed for the No. 5 Mk I rifle ("jungle carbine"). Post-war versions were made that would fit No. 4 rifles and were designated No. 7 and No. 9 blade bayonets.

During the course of the Second World War, the No. 4 rifle was further simplified for mass-production with the creation of the No. 4 Mk I* in 1942, with the bolt release catch replaced by a simpler notch on the bolt track of the rifle's receiver. It was produced only by Small Arms Limited at Long Branch in Canada, and Stevens-Savage Firearms in the US. The No. 4 rifle was primarily produced for the United Kingdom, Canada and some other Commonwealth countries including New Zealand. In 1943 it cost £7 15s (£7.75) to produce By comparison, a Sten Mk II submachine gun cost £2 10s (£2.50).

In the years after the Second World War, the British produced the No. 4 Mk 2 (Arabic numerals replaced Roman numerals in official names in 1944) rifle, a refined and improved No. 4 rifle with the trigger hung forward from the butt collar and not from the trigger guard, beech wood stocks (with the original reinforcing strap and centre piece of wood in the rear of the forestock on the No. 4 Mk I/Mk I* being removed in favour of a tie screw and nut) and brass "gunmetal" buttplates (during the war the British, Americans and Canadians replaced the brass buttplates on the No. 4 rifles with a zinc alloy (Zamak) type to reduce costs and speed production). Near the end of the war and after, Canada made blued steel buttplates. With the introduction of the No. 4 Mk 2 rifle, the British refurbished many of their No. 4 rifles and brought them up to the same standard as the No. 4 Mk 2. The No. 4 Mk 1 rifles were renamed No. 4 Mk I/2, while No. 4 Mk I* rifles that were brought up to Mk 2 standard were renamed No. 4 Mk I/3.

The refurbishment of the No. 4 Mk I's and No. 4 Mk I*s to the No. 4 Mk 2 specifications were done during the 1950s at ROF Fazakerley and BSA Shirley. The No. 4 rifles refurbished at ROF Fazakerley were for British military use while No. 4 rifles refurbished at BSA Shirley were for commercial sale to various British Commonwealth countries and to civilian rifle shooters in the UK and the Commonwealth.

== Rifle No. 5 Mk I—the "jungle carbine" ==
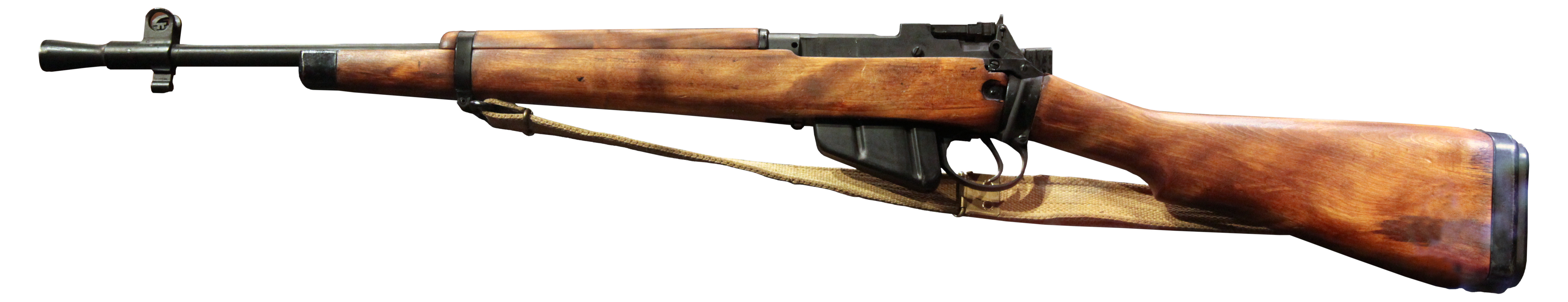
Rifle No. 5 on display at the Parachute Regiment and Airborne Forces Museum

Later in the war, the need for a shorter, lighter rifle forced the development of the Rifle, No. 5 Mk I (the "jungle carbine"). With a cut-down stock, a prominent flash hider, and a "lightening-cut" receiver machined to remove all unnecessary metal, reduced barrel length of 18.8 in (478 mm) the No. 5 was shorter and 2 lb (0.9 kg) lighter. Despite a rubber butt-pad, the .303 round produced excessive recoil due to the shorter barrel. It was unsuitable for general issue and production ceased in 1947, due to an "inherent fault in the design", often claimed to be a "wandering zero" and accuracy problems.

The No. 5 iron sight line was similar to the No. 4 Mark I and featured a rear receiver aperture battle sight calibrated for 300 yd (274 m) with an additional ladder aperture sight that could be flipped up and was calibrated for 200–800 yd (183–732 m) in 100 yd (91 m) increments. The No. 5 Mk I was popular with soldiers owing to its light weight, portability and shorter length than a standard Lee–Enfield rifle. The No. 5 was first issued to the British 1st Airborne Division and used during its liberation of Denmark and Norway in 1945. BSA-Shirley, Birmingham produced 81,329 rifles and ROF Fazakerley, Liverpool 169,807 rifles. It was equipped with a No. 5 Mk I blade bayonet which had a large muzzle ring to fit over the flash hider. The No. 7 Mk I/L bayonet, which has a rotating handle and a large ring on the cross-guard was not for the No. 5 Mk I rifle as many collectors believe.

An Australian experimental version of the No. 5 Mk I, designated Rifle, No. 6, Mk I was also developed, using an SMLE MK III* as a starting point (as opposed to the No. 4 Mk I used to develop the No. 5 Mk I). The Australian military was not permitted to manufacture the No. 4 Mk I, because the Lithgow Small Arms Factory was producing the SMLE Mk III. The No. 6 Mk I never entered full production and examples are rare and valuable to collectors. A "shortened and lightened" version of the SMLE Mk III* rifle was also tested by the Australian military and a very small number were manufactured at SAF Lithgow during the course of the Second World War.

The term "jungle carbine" was popularised in the 1950s by the Santa Fe Arms Corporation, a U.S. importer which refurbished many surplus rifles, converting many of the No. 4 marks, in the hope of increasing sales of a rifle that had little U.S. market penetration. It was never an official military designation but British and Commonwealth troops serving in the Burmese and Pacific theatres during World War II had been known to unofficially refer to the No. 5 Mk I as a "jungle carbine". The No. 4 and No. 5 rifles served in the Korean War (as did the No. 1 Mk III* SMLE and sniper "T" variants, mostly with Australian troops).

== Lee–Enfield conversions and training models ==
=== Sniper rifles ===
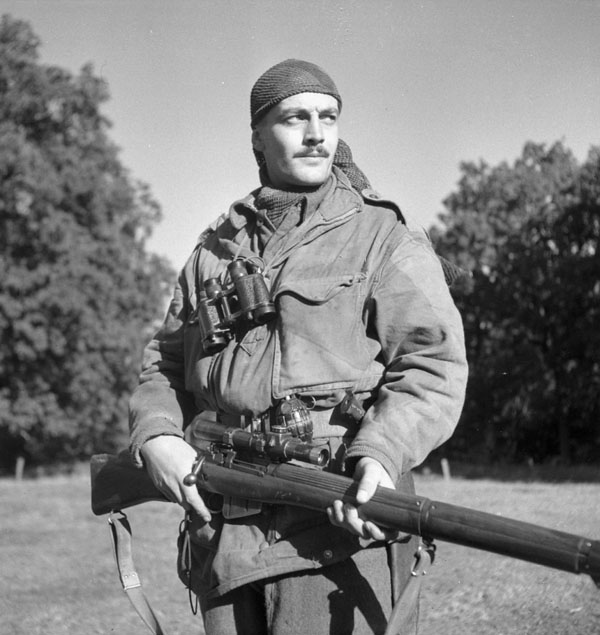
Canadian sniper Sergeant Harold Marshall carries a No. 4 Mk I (T) chambered in .303 British

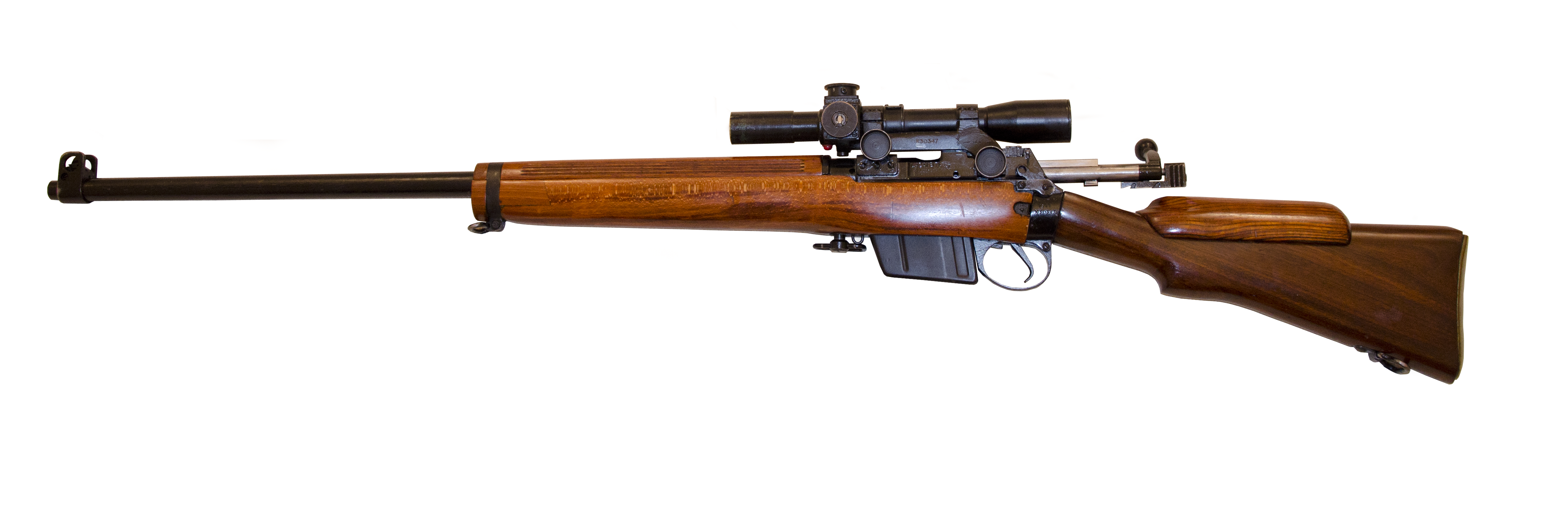
L42A1 sniper rifle chambered in 7.62×51mm NATO

During both World Wars and the Korean War, Lee–Enfield rifles were modified for use as sniper rifles. The Australian Army modified 1,612 Lithgow SMLE No. 1 Mk III* rifles by adding a heavy target barrel, cheek-piece, and a World War I era Pattern 1918 telescope, creating the SMLE No. 1 Mk III* (HT). (HT standing for "heavy barrel, telescopic sight), which saw service in the Second World War, Korea, and Malaya and was used for sniper training through to the late 1970s.

During the Second World War, standard No. 4 rifles, selected for their accuracy during factory tests, were modified by the addition of a wooden cheek rising-piece, and telescopic sight mounts designed to accept a No. 32 3.5× telescopic sight. The telescopic sight had a field of view of 8 degrees 20 minutes and featured a bullet drop compensation range drum on top of the sight graduated in 50 yards (45.7 m) increments from 0 to 1,000 yards (914 m). Side adjustments in 2 MOA increments were made by the drum mounted at the side of the sight. These rifles were designated as the No. 4 Mk I (T). The accuracy requirement was ability to place seven of seven shots in a 5 inches (12.7 cm) circle at 200 yards (183 m) and six of seven shots in a 10 inches (25.4 cm) circle at 400 yards (366 m). The wooden cheek-piece was attached with two screws. The rear "battle sight" was ground off to make room to attach the No. 32 telescope sight to the left side of the receiver. Each No. 32 and its bracket (mount) were matched and serial numbered to a specific rifle.

In British service, the No. 32 telescope—which was designed as an aiming optic for the Bren light machine gun—progressed through three marks with the Mk I introduced in 1942, the Mk II in 1943 which offered side adjustments in finer 1 MOA increments, and finally the Mk III (Mk 3) in 1944 which had an improved field of view of 8 degrees 30 minutes. A transitional model the No. 32 Mk 2/1 was also made. The Canadian scopes made by Research Enterprises Limited and were prefixed with a letter C and went through C No. 32 Mk I, Mk I A (a transitional model), Mk II and Mk 3. Many Mk 3s and Mk 2/1s (Mk 2s Modified to Mk 3 standard) were later modified for use with the 7.62×51mm NATO L42A1 sniper rifle. They were then known by the designation Telescope Straight, Sighting L1A1.

Initial production was 1,403 conversions of 1931–1933 troop trials No. 4 Mk I rifles at RSAF Enfield and a few others including Stevens-Savage No. 4s. These were converted in late 1941 and into the later part of 1942. Then, the work was assigned to Holland & Holland, the famous British sporting gun manufacturers, which converted about 23,000 No. 4 Mk I (T) and No. 4 Mk I* (T) sniper rifles. The Holland & Holland conversions usually have the contractor code "S51" on the underside of the buttstock. BSA Shirley undertook 100 conversions to .22". James Purdey and Sons fitted special buttstocks later in the war. About 3,000 rifles, mostly Stevens-Savage, appear to have been partially converted by Holland & Holland but never received brackets, scopes of the final "T" mark. Canada converted about 1,588 rifles at Small Arms Limited (to the end of 1945) and, in 1946, at Canadian Arsenals Limited. Both were located at Long Branch, Ontario. Most of the Canadian made No. 4 Mk I* (T) sniper equipments went into British service. The No. 4 (T) rifles were extensively employed in various conflicts until the late 1960s.

The British military switched over to the 7.62×51mm NATO round in the 1950s; starting in 1970, over 1,000 of the No. 4 Mk I (T) and No. 4 Mk I* (T) sniper rifles were converted to this new calibre and designated L42A1. The L42A1 sniper rifle continued as the British Army's standard sniper weapon being phased out by 1993, and replaced by Accuracy International's L96.

=== .22 training rifles ===
Numbers of Lee–Enfield rifles were converted to .22 calibre training rifles, in order to teach cadets and new recruits the various aspects of shooting, firearms safety, and marksmanship at a markedly reduced cost per round. Initially, rifles were converted from obsolete Magazine Lee–Metford and Magazine Lee–Enfield rifles but from the First World War onwards SMLE rifles were used instead. These were known as .22 Pattern 1914 short rifles during The First World War and Rifle, No. 2 Mk IV from 1921 onwards. They were generally single-shot affairs, originally using Morris tubes chambered for the cheap .22L cartridge and some larger types, circa 1907. Some were later modified with special adaptors to enable magazine loading. In 1914, Enfield produced complete .22 barrels and bolts specifically for converting .303 units, and these soon became the most common conversion. A five-round .22 cal Parker-Hiscock magazine was also developed and in service for a relatively short period during the later period of the First World War, but was subsequently withdrawn from issue due to reliability problems with its quite complicated loading and feeding mechanisms. No. 2 Mk IV rifles are externally identical to .303 calibre SMLE Mk III* rifles, the only difference being the .22 calibre barrel, empty magazine case, bolthead and extractor which have been modified to fire .22 calibre rimfire cartridges.

After the Second World War, the Rifle, No. 7, Rifle, No. 8 and Rifle, No. 9, all .22 rimfire trainers and target rifles based on the Lee action, were adopted or in use with cadet units and target shooters throughout the Commonwealth, the No.8 as of 2017 has been replaced among cadet forces due to obsolescence.

In Britain, a .22RF version of the No. 5 rifle was prototyped by BSA and trialled with a view to it becoming the British Service training rifle when the .303" CF No. 5 was initially mooted as being a potential replacement for the No. 4 rifle.

The C No.7 22" MK.I rifle is a .22 single-shot, manually fed, training version of the No. 4 Mk I* rifle manufactured at Long Branch. Production of this model was 1944–1946 and a few in 1950 to 1953.

=== Muskets and shotguns ===
Conversion of rifles to smoothbore guns was carried out in several locations, at various times, for varying reasons.

SAF Lithgow, in Australia, produced shotguns based on the Mk III action under the "Slazenger" name, chambering the common commercial .410 shotgun shell. Commercial gunsmiths in Australia and Britain converted both Mk III and No. 4 rifles to .410 shotguns. These conversions were prompted by firearms legislation that made possession of a rifle chambered in a military cartridge both difficult and expensive. Smoothbore shotguns could be legally held with far less trouble.

RFI, in India, converted a large number of Mk III rifles to single-shot muskets, chambered for the .410 Indian musket cartridge. These conversions were for issue to police and prison guards, to provide a firearm with a much-reduced power and range in comparison to the .303 cartridge. A further likely consideration was the difficulty of obtaining replacement ammunition in the event of the rifle's theft or the carrier's desertion.

While British and Australian conversions were to the standard commercially available .410 shotgun cartridge (though of varying chamber lengths) the Indian conversions have been the source of considerable confusion. The Indian conversions were originally chambered for the .410 Indian musket cartridge, which is based on the .303 British cartridge, and will not chamber the common .410 shotgun cartridge. Many of these muskets were rechambered, after being sold as surplus, and can now be used with commercially available ammunition. Unmodified muskets require handloading of ammunition, as the .410 Indian Musket cartridge was not commercially distributed and does not appear to have been manufactured since the 1950s.

Numerous attempts have been made to convert the various single-shot .410 shotgun models to a bolt-action repeating model by removing the wooden magazine plug and replacing it with a standard 10-round SMLE magazine. None of these is known to have been successful, though some owners have adapted three-round magazines for Savage and Stevens shotguns to function in a converted SMLE shotgun, or even placing such a magazine inside a gutted SMLE magazine.

=== Civilian conversions and variants ===
From the late 1940s, legislation in New South Wales, Australia, heavily restricted .303 British calibre (and other "military calibre") rifles, so large numbers of SMLEs were converted to "wildcat" calibres such as .303/25, .303/22, .303/270 and the popular 7.7×54mm round. 303/25 calibre sporterised SMLEs are very common in Australia today, although ammunition for them has been very scarce since the 1980s. The restrictions placed on "military calibre" rifles in New South Wales were lifted in 1975, and many people who had converted their Lee–Enfields to the "wildcat" rounds converted their rifles back to .303 British. Post-Second World War, SAF Lithgow converted a number of SMLE rifles to commercial sporting rifles- notably the .22 Hornet model- under the "Slazenger" brand.

In the early 1950s Essential Agencies Ltd. (E.A.L.), of Toronto, Ontario, produced a run of several thousand survival rifles based on the No. 4 action, but lightened and shortened, chambered in .303 British. Serial numbers below 6000 were for civilian sale, serial numbers 6000 and higher were built under contract to the Canadian government. The Royal Canadian Air Force also used these as a survival rifle in the remote parts of Canada.

=== L59A1 Drill Rifle ===
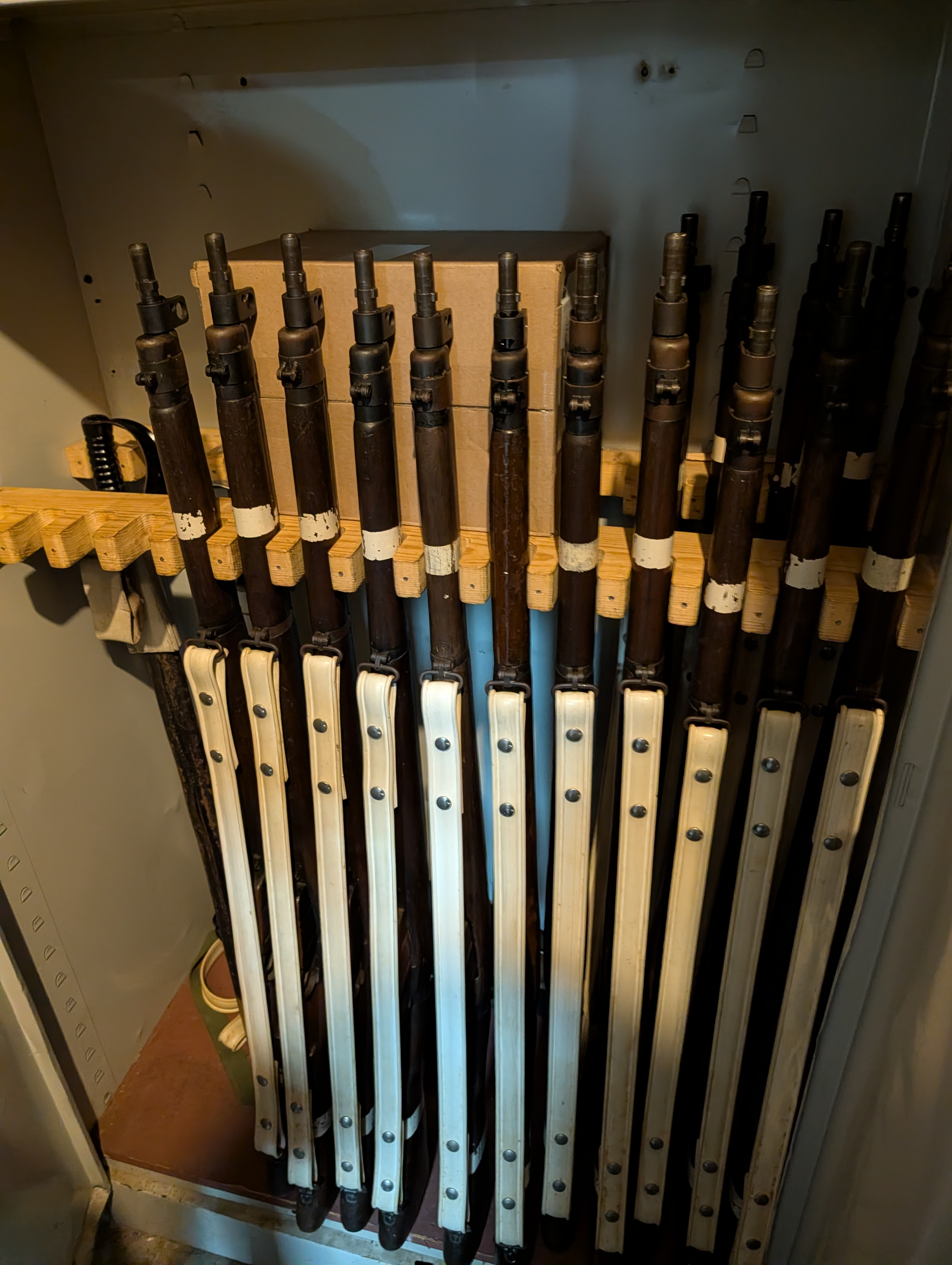
15 drill purpose Lee-Enfield No.4 MK I (1942-1944) rifles used by 307 RCSCC Mariner.

The L59A1 was a conversion of the No. 4 rifle (all marks) to a drill purpose rifle that was incapable of being restored to a firing configuration. It was introduced in service in the 1970s. A conversion specification of No. 1 rifles to L59A2 drill purpose was also prepared but was abandoned due to the greater difficulty of machining involved and the negligible numbers still in the hands of cadet units.

The L59A1 arose from British government concerns over the vulnerability of the Army Cadet Force and school Combined Cadet Forces' (CCF) stocks of small arms to theft by terrorists, in particular the Irish Republican Army following raids on CCF armouries in the 1950s and 1960s. Previous conversions to drill purpose (DP) of otherwise serviceable rifles were not considered to be sufficiently incapable of restoration to fireable state and were a potential source of reconversion spares.

L59A1 drill rifles were rendered incapable of being fired, and of being restored to a fireable form, by extensive modifications that included the welding of the barrel to the receiver, modifications to the receiver that removed the supporting structures for the bolt's locking lugs and blocking the installation of an unaltered bolt, the removal of the striker's tip, the blocking of the striker's hole in the bolt head and the removal of most of the bolt body's locking lugs. Most bolts were copper plated for identification. A plug was welded in place forward of the chamber, and a window was cut in the side of the barrel. The stock and fore end were marked with broad white painted bands (often with red bands, and also rarely seen blue bands or stripes) and the letters DP for easy identification.

== Special service Lee–Enfields: Commando and automatic models ==
=== De Lisle commando carbine ===
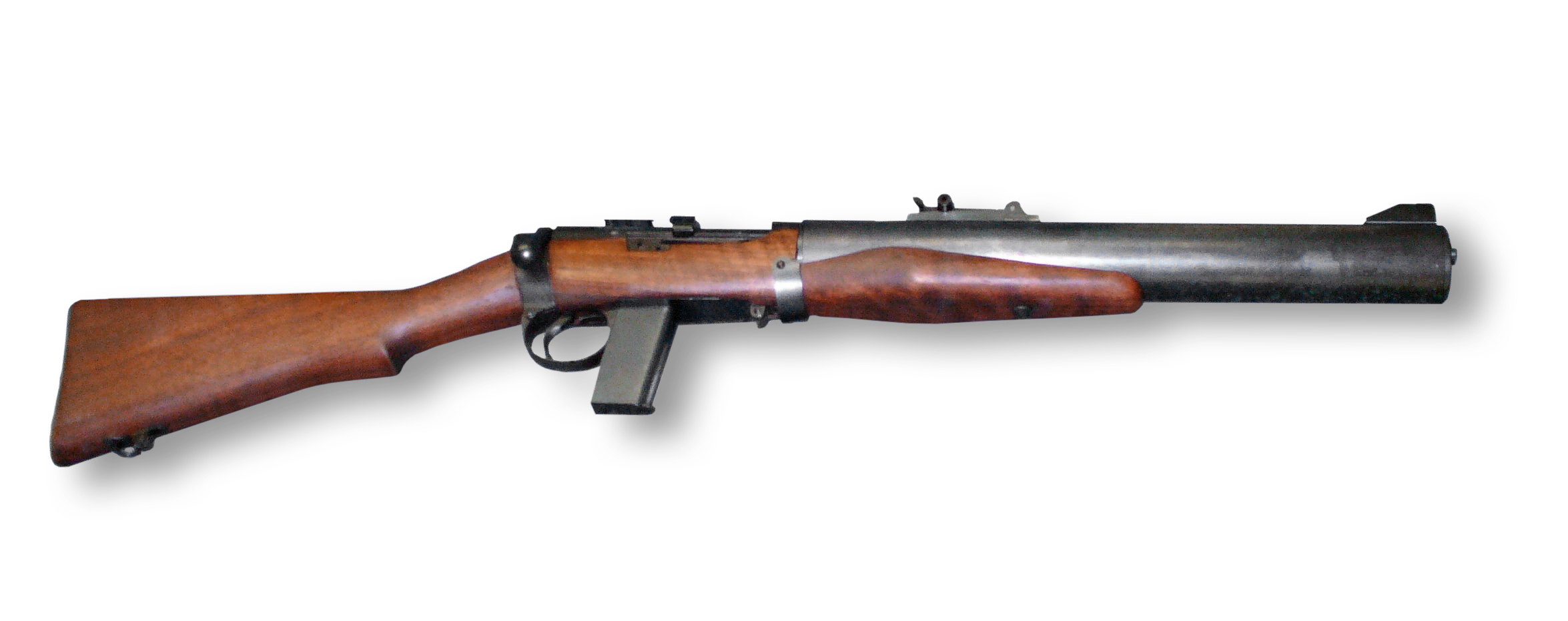
The initial wooden-stocked De Lisle with a suppressor

The commando units of the British military requested a suppressed rifle for killing sentries, guard dogs and other clandestine operational uses during the Second World War. The resulting weapon, designed by Godfray de Lisle, was effectively an SMLE Mk III* receiver redesigned to take a .45 ACP cartridge and associated magazine, with a barrel from a Thompson submachine gun and an integrated suppressor. It was produced in very limited numbers and an experimental folding stock version was made.

=== Ekins automatic rifle ===
The Ekins automatic rifle was one of the numerous attempts to convert a Lee–Enfield SMLE to an automatic rifle. Similar developments were the South African Rieder automatic rifle and the New Zealand and Australian Charlton automatic rifles.

=== Howard Francis carbine ===
Howard Francis self-loading carbine
- Type: Carbine
- Place of origin: United Kingdom

Production history
- Designer: Howard Francis

Specifications
- Mass: 3.7 kg (8.2 lb)
- Length: 812 mm (32.0 in)
- Barrel length: 324 mm (12.8 in)
- Cartridge: 7.63×25mm Mauser
- Rate of fire: Semi-automatic
- Feed system: 12-round box magazine
- Sights: Iron sights

The Howard Francis self-loading carbine was a conversion of a No. 1 Mk III to the 7.63×25mm Mauser pistol cartridge. It fired in semi-automatic only and suffered some feeding and extraction problems and, despite meeting accuracy and soundness of design concept, never made it past the prototype stage.

=== Howell automatic rifle ===
The Howell automatic rifle was the first attempt to convert the Lee–Enfield SMLE into a semi-automatic rifle. The weapon was reliable but unergonomic for the user as the force of the recoiling bolt interfered with handling.

=== Rieder automatic rifle ===
The Rieder automatic rifle was an automatic (full automatic only) Lee–Enfield SMLE rifle of South African origin. The Rieder device could be installed straight away without the use of tools.

=== Turner automatic conversion ===
Long-stroke piston tilting bolt semi automatic conversion developed by Turner Russel, proposed for the Canadian government in 1941 but was rejected.

== Conversion to 7.62×51mm NATO ==
In 1954, the War Office adopted the 7.62×51mm NATO-calibre L1A1 Self-Loading Rifle for use by frontline infantry units. While it was intended that rear-echelon and reserve units would continue to use the Lee–Enfield No. 4 in order to avoid the expense of rearming those units with the L1A1 as well, Britain's commitments as a NATO member meant that the .303in cartridge could no longer be used; thus, the early 1960s saw the approval of a plan to convert the Lee–Enfield No. 4 to the newer NATO cartridge. Rifles that were thus converted were re-designated as the L8 series of rifles and refitted with 7.62×51mm NATO barrels, new bolt faces and extractor claws, new rear sights, and 7.62×51mm NATO magazines. The appearance of the L8 series rifles was no different from the original No. 4 rifles, except for the new barrel (which still retained the original No. 4 rifle bayonet lugs) and magazine. The L8 series of rifles consisted of L8A1 rifles (converted No. 4 Mk 2 rifles), L8A1 (T) rifles (converted No .4 Mk 1 (T) rifles), L8A2 rifles (converted No. 4 Mk 1/2 rifles), L8A3 rifles (converted No. 4 Mk 1/3 rifles), L8A4 rifles (converted No. 4 Mk 1 rifles), and L8A5 rifles (converted No. 4 Mk 1* rifles).

The results of the trials that were conducted on the L8 series rifles were mixed; the L8A1 (T) rifles fired test groups that bore no relation to those fired while they were still No. 4 Mk 1 (T) rifles nor was there any consistent accuracy between those rifles that had been chosen for conversion, while the regular L8 rifles gave a better performance but with little or no improvement over .303in weapons; consequently, the conversion programme was abandoned and what was now known as the Ministry of Defence was forced to expand the issue of L1A1 rifles to non-frontline units. However, experience from the programme, including the magazine design, was used to aid the later L42A1 conversion programme.

In the late 1960s, RSAF Enfield entered the commercial market by producing No. 4-based 7.62×51mm rifles for sale. The products were marketed under alliterative names e.g. Enfield Envoy, a rifle intended for civilian competition target shooting and Enfield Enforcer, a rifle fitted with a Pecar telescopic sight to suit the requirements of police firearms teams.

Sterling Armaments of Dagenham, Essex, produced a conversion kit comprising a new 7.62 mm barrel, magazine, extractor and ejector for commercial sale. The main difference between the two conversions was in the cartridge ejection arrangement; the Enfield magazine carried a hardened steel projection that struck the rim of the extracted case to eject it, the Sterling system employed a spring-loaded plunger inserted into the receiver wall.

=== Ishapore 2A/2A1 ===
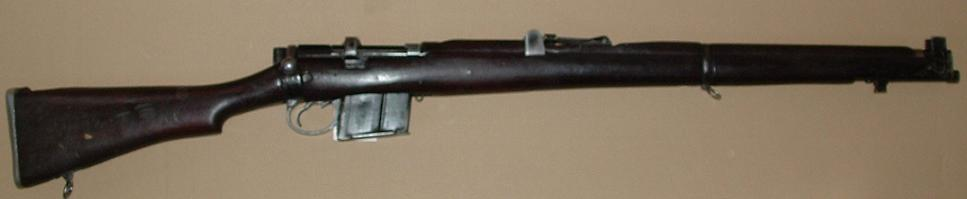
Ishapore 2A1

At some point just after the Sino-Indian War of 1962, the Rifle Factory Ishapore in India began producing a new type of rifle known as the Rifle 7.62 mm 2A, which was based on the SMLE Mk III* and was slightly redesigned to use the 7.62×51mm NATO round. Externally the new rifle is very similar to the classic Mk III*, with the exception of the buttplate (the buttplate from the 1A SLR is fitted) and magazine, which is more "square" than the SMLE magazine, and usually carries twelve rounds instead of ten, although a number of 2A1s have been noted with 10-round magazines.

Ishapore 2A and Ishapore 2A1 receivers are made with improved (EN) steel (to handle the increased pressures of the 7.62×51mm round) and the extractor is redesigned to suit the rimless cartridge. From 1965 to 1975 (when production is believed to have been discontinued), the sight ranging graduations were changed from 2,000 to 800, and the rifle re-designated Rifle 7.62 mm 2A1. The original 2,000 yards (1,800 m) rear sight arm was found to be suitable for the ballistics of the 7.62×51mm, which is around 10% more powerful and equates to a flatter trajectory than that of the .303 British Mk VII ammunition, so it was a simple matter to think of the 2,000 as representing metres rather than yards. It was then decided that the limit of the effective range was a more realistic proposition at 800 m.

The Ishapore 2A and 2A1 rifles are often incorrectly described as ".308 conversions". The 2A/2A1 rifles are not conversions of .303 calibre SMLE Mk III* rifles. Rather, they are newly manufactured firearms and are not technically chambered for commercial .308 Winchester ammunition. However, many 2A/2A1 owners shoot such ammunition in their rifles with no problems, although some factory loaded .308 Winchester cartridges may appear to generate higher pressures than 7.62×51mm NATO, even though the rounds are otherwise interchangeable – this is due to the different systems of pressure measurement used for NATO and commercial cartridges.

=== 4 Mk 4 Rifle ===
Locally produced Lee Enfield rifle. There was a lot controversy over the weapon because these are the same Lee Enfields once sold by Australian International Arms (AIA) as the M10 No. 4 Mk IV, AIA denying multiple times they were using Vietnam to manufacture the rifles. The company went out of business in 2011. Limited used by Militia Forces. Modernized as the SBT7MK4, chamber in 7.62x51mm NATO.

== Manufacturers ==
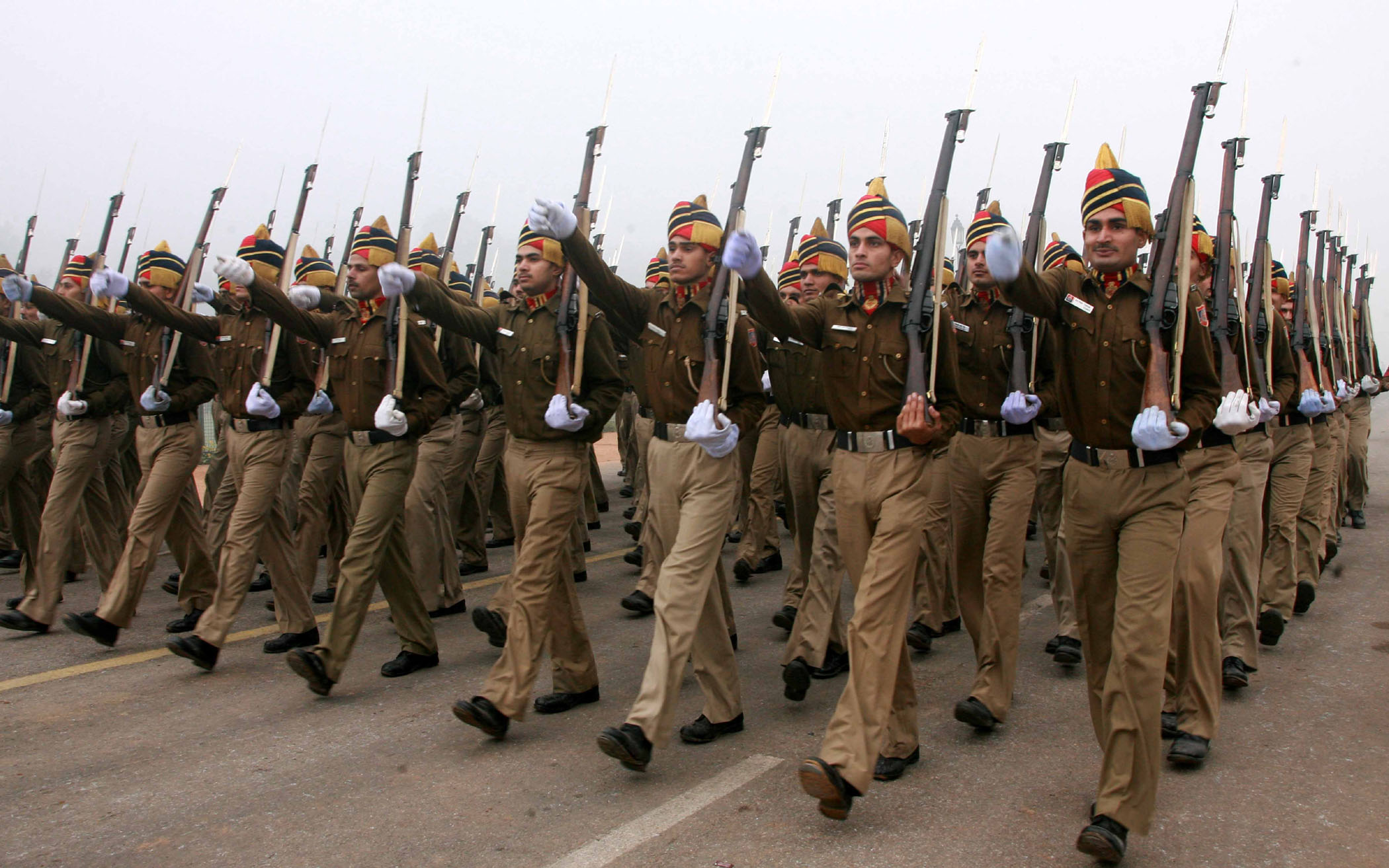
A Delhi Police marching contingent passes through the Rajpath during the rehearsal for the celebration of 60th Republic Day -2009 carrying the Indian version of the Lee Enfield SMLE

In total, over 16 million Lee–Enfields had been produced in several factories on different continents when production in Britain ended in 1956 at the Royal Ordnance Factory ROF Fazakerley in Liverpool, after that factory had been plagued with industrial unrest. The machinery from ROF Fazakerley was sold to Pakistan Ordnance Factories (POF) in Rawalpindi where production and repair of the No. 4 Mk I started from 1952 till 1957 and then production changed over to No. 4 Mk II from 1957.

Also contributing to the total was the Rifle Factory Ishapore (RFI) at Ishapore in India, which continued to produce the SMLE in both .303 and 7.62×51mm NATO until the 1980s, and is still manufacturing a sporting rifle based on the SMLE Mk III action, chambered for a .315 calibre cartridge, the Birmingham Small Arms Company factory at Shirley near Birmingham, and SAF Lithgow in Australia, who finally discontinued production of the SMLE Mk III* with a final 'machinery proving' batch of 1000 rifles in early 1956, using 1953-dated receivers. During the First World War alone, 3.8 million SMLE rifles were produced in the UK by RSAF Enfield, BSA, and LSA.

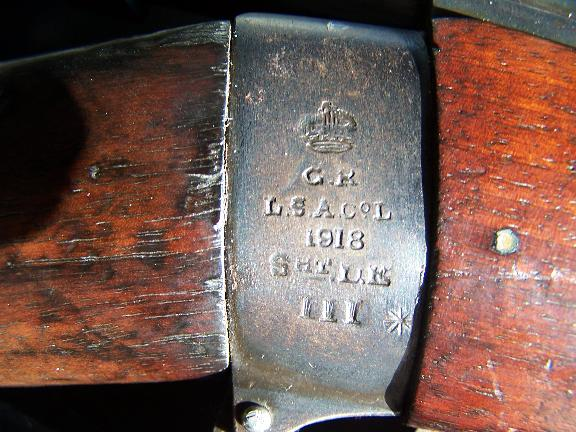
The wristguard markings on a 1918-dated Short Magazine Lee–Enfield Mk III* rifle's receiver manufactured by the London Small Arms Co. Ltd. The "G.R." under the crown stands for "George Rex" and refers to the reigning monarch at the time the rifle was manufactured.

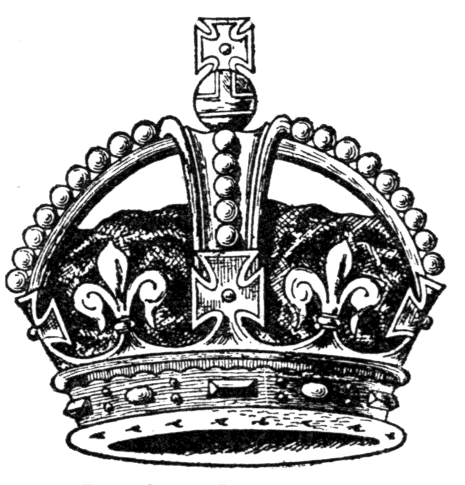
Tudor Crown seen on King George V era manufactured SMLE Mk III rifle receivers

=== List of manufacturers ===
Manufacturer markings of MLE, CLLE, and SMLE Mk I—Mk III*
Marking	Manufacturer	Country
Enfield	Royal Small Arms Factory Enfield	United Kingdom
Sparkbrook	Royal Small Arms Factory Sparkbrook	United Kingdom
BSA Co	Birmingham Small Arms Company	United Kingdom
LSA Co	London Small Arms Co. Ltd	United Kingdom
Lithgow	Lithgow Small Arms Factory	Australia
GRI	Rifle Factory Ishapore	British India
RFI	Rifle Factory Ishapore	India (Post-Independence)

"SSA" and "NRF" markings are sometimes encountered on First World War-dated SMLE Mk III* rifles. These stand for "Standard Small Arms" and "National Rifle Factory", respectively. Rifles so marked were assembled using parts from various other manufacturers, as part of a scheme during the First World War to boost rifle production in the UK. Only SMLE Mk III* rifles are known to have been assembled under this program. GRI stands for "Georgius Rex, Imperator" (Latin for 'King George, Emperor (of India)', denoting a rifle made during the British Raj. RFI stands for "Rifle Factory, Ishapore", denoting a rifle made after the Partition of India in 1947.

Manufacturer marks for No. 4 Mk I, No. 4 Mk I* and No. 4 Mk 2
Marking	Manufacturer	Country
ROF (F)	Royal Ordnance Factory Fazakerley	United Kingdom
ROF (M)	Royal Ordnance Factory Maltby	United Kingdom
B	The Birmingham Small Arms Company Limited	United Kingdom
M47 and later M47C	Birmingham Small Arms Factory (Shirley)	United Kingdom
Long Branch	Small Arms Limited and later, Canadian Arsenals Limited	Canada
Squared S and US property	Savage Arms	United States
POF	Pakistan Ordnance Factories	Pakistan

Second World War UK production rifles had manufacturer codes for security reasons. For example, BSA Shirley is denoted by M47C, ROF(M) is often simply stamped "M", and BSA is simply stamped "B". Savage-made Lee–Enfield No. 4 Mk I and No. 4 Mk I* rifles are all stamped "US property". They were supplied to the UK under the Lend-Lease programme during the Second World War. No Savage Lee–Enfields were ever issued to the US military; the markings existed solely to maintain the pretense that American equipment was being lent to the UK rather than permanently sold to them.

==== Australian International Arms No. 4 Mk IV ====
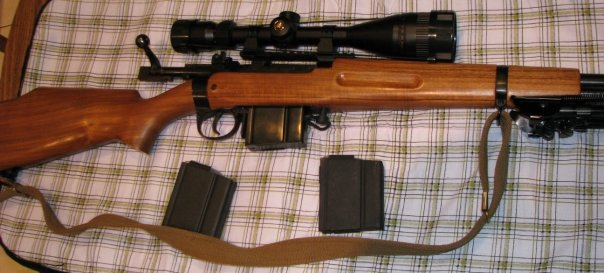
AIA M10-B2 match rifle

The Brisbane-based Australian International Arms also manufactured a modern reproduction of the No. 4 Mk II rifle, which they marketed as the AIA No. 4 Mk IV. The rifles were manufactured by parts outsourcing and were assembled and finished in Australia, chambered in 7.62×51mm NATO and fed from modified M14 magazines. The No. 4 Mk IV was designed with the modern shooter in mind, and has the ability to mount a telescopic sight without drilling and tapping the receiver.

AIA also offered the AIA M10-A1 rifle, a jungle carbine-styled version chambered in 7.62×39mm Russian, which uses AK-47 magazines. Magazine supply and importation (M14 and AK 10 single stack mag) whilst legal in Australia, has been spasmodically curtailed by Australian Federal Customs (for more information, see Gun politics in Australia). It is possible to obtain a 10-round (the maximum allowed by law) M14 magazines for the M10-B2 match rifles in particular, provided an import permit from the appropriate licensing services division can be obtained in some states, yet Australian Federal Customs may still refuse importation on no valid grounds.

=== Khyber Pass copies ===
A number of British Service Rifles, predominantly the Martini–Henry and Martini–Enfield, but also the various Lee–Enfield rifles, have been produced by small manufacturers in the Khyber Pass region of the Pakistani-Afghan border.

"Khyber Pass copies", as they are known, tend to be copied exactly from a "master" rifle, which may itself be a Khyber Pass copy, markings and all, which is why it's not uncommon to see Khyber Pass rifles with the N in "Enfield" reversed, amongst other things.

The quality on such rifles varies from "as good as a factory-produced example" to "dangerously unsafe", tending towards the latter end of the scale. Khyber Pass copy rifles cannot generally stand up to the pressures generated by modern commercial ammunition, and are generally considered unsafe to fire under any circumstances.

Khyber Pass copies can be recognised by a number of factors, notably:

- Spelling errors in the markings; as noted the most common of which is a reversed "N" in "Enfield")
- V.R. (Victoria Regina) cyphers dated after 1901; Queen Victoria died in 1901, so any rifles made after 1901 should be stamped "E.R" (Edwardius Rex—King Edward VII or King Edward VIII) or "G.R" (Georgius Rex—King George V or King George VI).
- Generally inferior workmanship, including weak or soft metal, poorly finished wood, and badly struck markings.

=== Armalon ===
British company Armalon Ltd developed a number of rifles based on the Lee Enfield No. 4. The PC rifle is a carbine in pistol and revolver calibres, the AL42 is a 5.56 mm rifle and the AL30C, a carbine in .30 carbine.

== Contemporary service ==
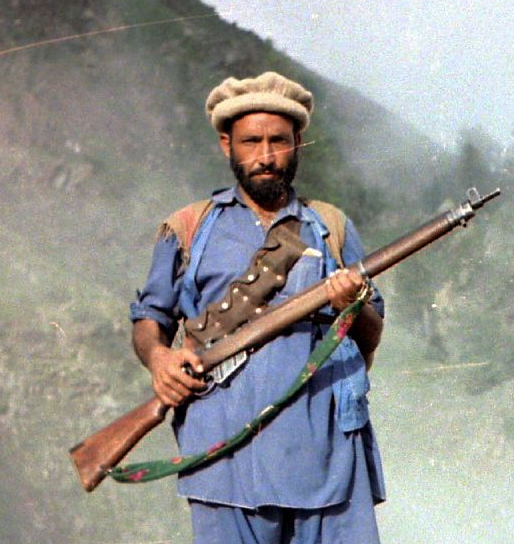
An Afghan mujahid carries a Lee–Enfield in August 1985

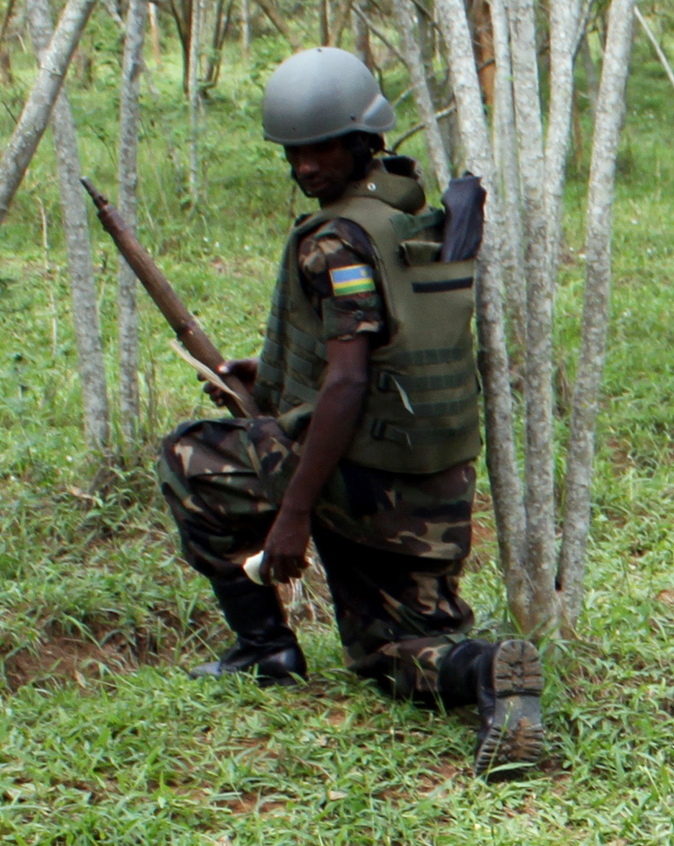
A Rwandan soldier trains with a Lee-Enfield, 2011

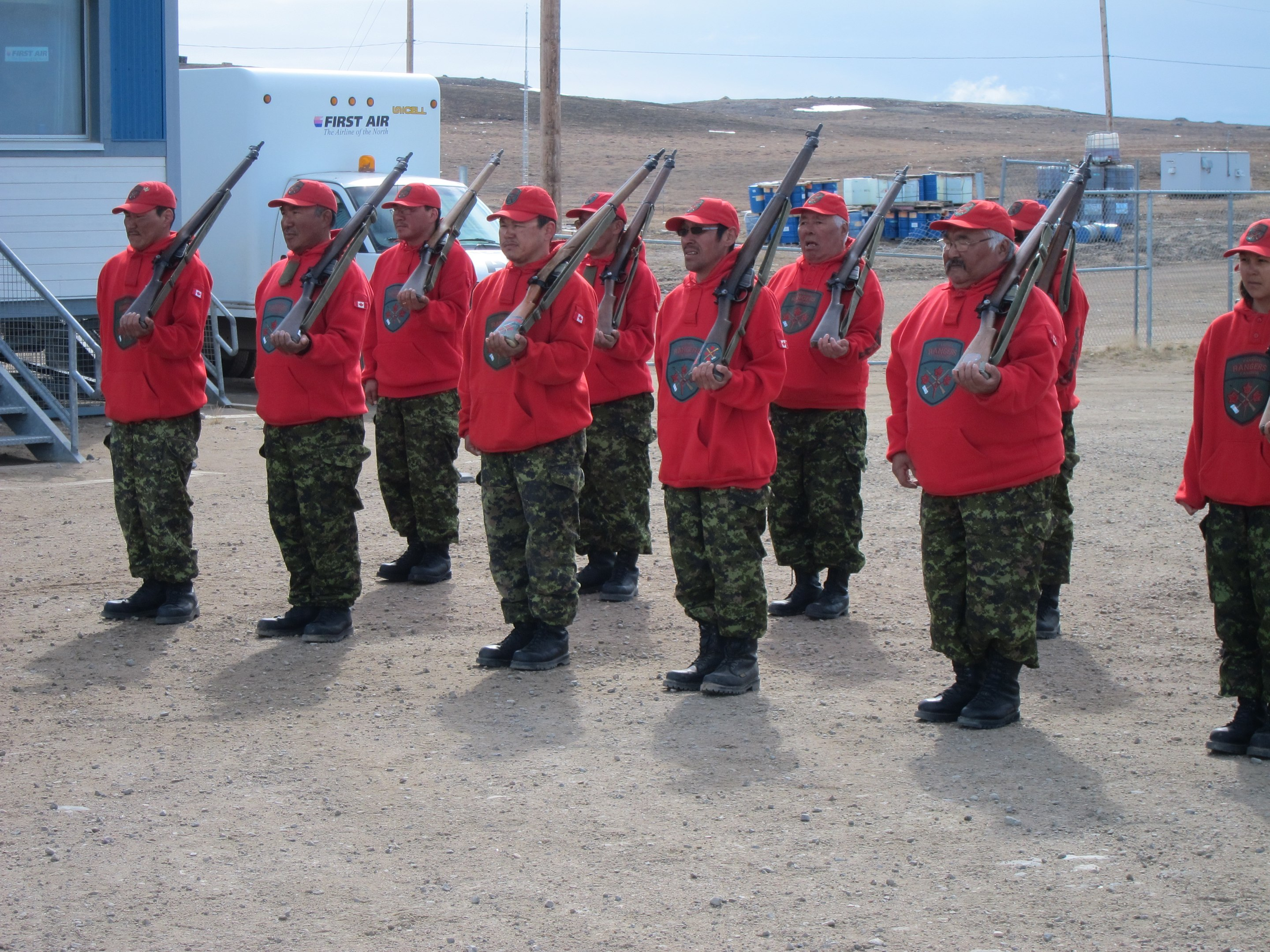
Canadian Rangers, photographed in Nunavut, June 2011

The Lee–Enfield family of rifles is the second oldest bolt-action rifle design still in official service, after the Mosin–Nagant. Lee–Enfield rifles are used by reserve forces and police forces in many Commonwealth countries, including Malawi. In Canada the .303 and .22 models were being phased out between 2016 and 2019. The Canadian Rangers had been using the .303 model for over 70 years but switched to the Colt Canada C19 due to increasing lack of spare parts. The Indian Army phased them out in 1990–92, replacing them with AKM-type rifles (see Indo-Russia Rifles). Indian police officers carrying SMLE Mk III* and Ishapore 2A1 rifles were a familiar sight throughout railway stations in India after Mumbai train bombings of 2006 and the 2008 Mumbai attacks. They are also still seen in the hands of Pakistani and Bangladeshi second-line police units. However, the Lee–Enfield was mainly replaced in main-line service in the Pakistani Police in the mid-1980s by the AK 47, in response to increasing proliferation of the Kalashnikov in the black market and civilian use. In Jordan, the Lee–Enfield was in use with the police and gendarmerie until 1971, and with the armed forces until 1965. In Iraq and Egypt, the Lee–Enfield was replaced by the Kalashnikov as the standard-issue rifle in the armed forces by the late 1950s, and in police forces by the late 1970s. In the UK, the single-shot .22 calibre Rifle No. 8 is in regular use with UK Cadet Forces as a light target rifle. Enfields continue to be used as drill weapons by the National Ceremonial Guard of the South African National Defence Force (SANDF) as well as the Australian Defence Force Cadets.

Many Afghans resisting the Soviet invasion of Afghanistan were armed with Lee–Enfields. The CIA's Operation Cyclone provided hundreds of thousands of Enfields to the Afghan mujahideen, funneling them through Pakistan's ISI. CIA officer Gust Avrakotos later arranged for the Egyptian Ministry of Defence to set up production lines of Enfield .303 ammunition specifically for the conflict. Later on when Avrakotos asked Michael Vickers to revamp their strategy, he stopped the Enfield system and, with the large amounts of money available thanks to Charlie Wilson, replaced them with a mix of modern weapons like AK-47s and mortars.

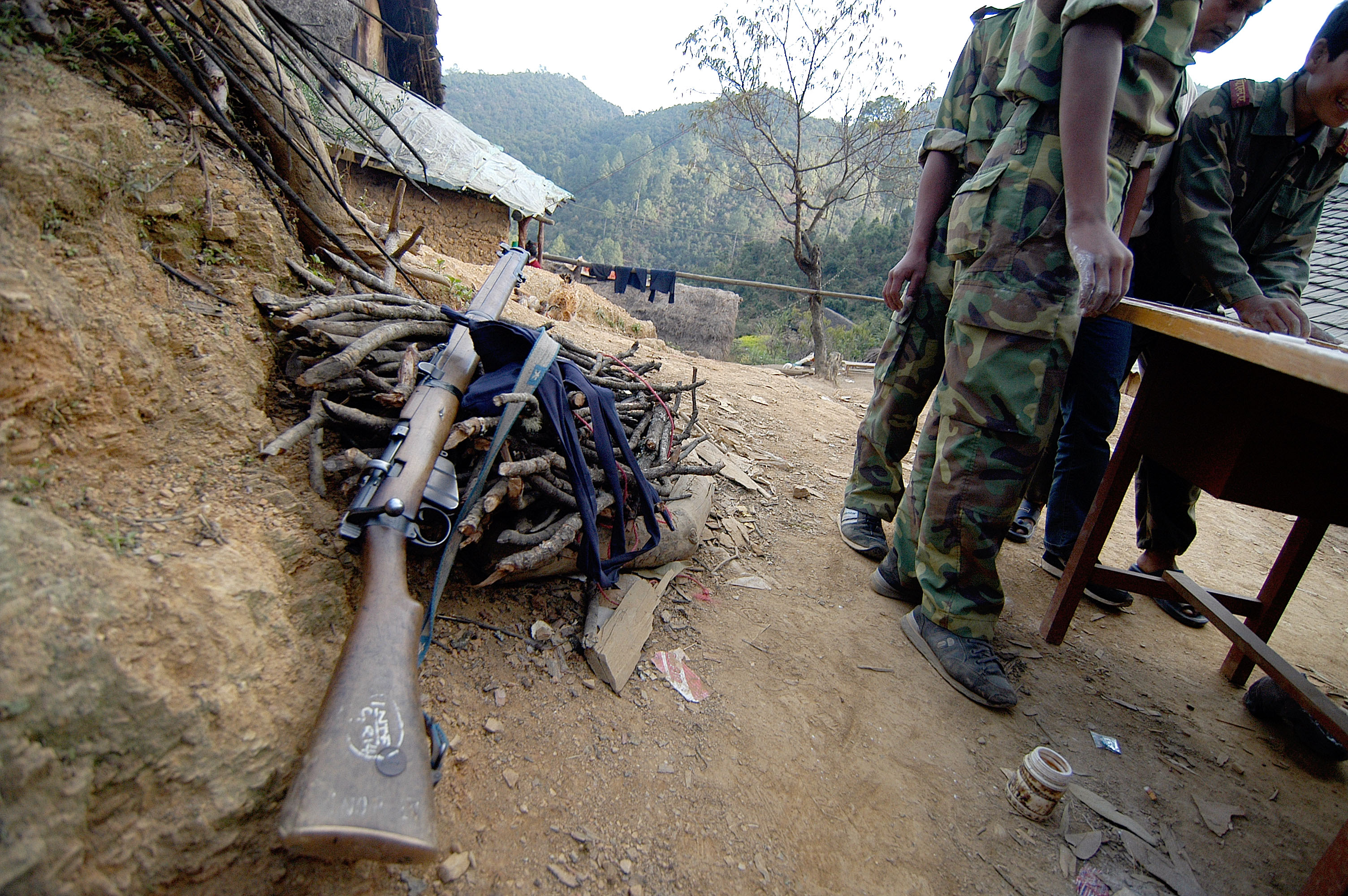
An SMLE owned by Maoist rebels in Nepal, 2005

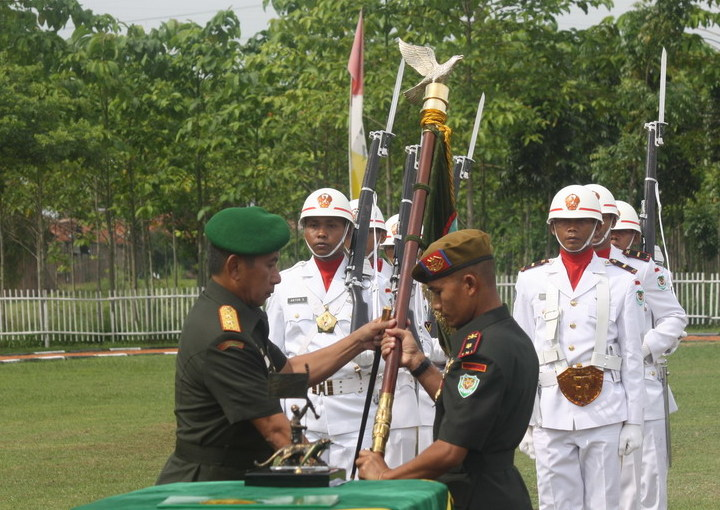
Change of command ceremony in Indonesian Army with colour guard holding Lee-Enfield rifles, 2013

Khyber Pass Copies patterned after the Lee–Enfield are still manufactured in the Khyber Pass region, as bolt-action rifles remain effective weapons in desert and mountain environments where long-range accuracy is more important than rate of fire. Lee–Enfield rifles are still popular in the region, despite the presence and ready availability of more modern weapons such as the SKS-45, the AKM, the Chinese Type 56 assault rifle, and the AK-74. As of 2012, Lee–Enfield rifles are still being used by the Taliban.

During the Nepalese Civil War, government troops were issued Lee–Enfield rifles to fight the Maoist rebels; Maoists also had access to SMLE rifles. Nepalese Police constables may also be usually seen equipped with SMLE rifles. Lee–Enfield rifles have also been seen in the hands of both the Naxalites and the Indian police in the ongoing Maoist insurgency in rural India.

Village Defence Guards (VDGs) formerly known as Village Defence Committees is a civilian militia first established in the mid-1990s in Indian-administered Jammu and Kashmir for the self-defence of locals, especially minorities such as Hindus, Sikhs and vulnerable section of Muslims in remote hilly villages against militancy have been with Lee–Enfield rifles, however same are being phased in favour of more advance self loading rifle (SLR) and INSAS.

Police forces in both the Solomon Islands and Vanuatu continue to operate and maintain stocks of No. 4 rifles. The Tongan security forces also retain a substantial number of No. 4 rifles donated from New Zealand's reserve stocks.

Lee Enfield rifles are used by the Jamaica Constabulary force for training recruits during field-craft exercises and drills.

== Civilian use ==
Lee–Enfields are very popular as hunting rifles and target shooting rifles. Many surplus Lee–Enfield rifles were sold in Australia, Canada, New Zealand, South Africa, the United Kingdom and the United States after the Second World War, and a fair number have been 'sporterised', having had the front furniture reduced or removed and a scope fitted so that they resemble a bolt-action sporting rifle. Top-notch accuracy is difficult to achieve with the Lee–Enfield design, as it was intended to be a battle rifle rather than a sharpshooter's weapon, and thus the Enfield is nowadays overshadowed by derivatives of Paul Mauser's design as a target shooting arm. They did, however, continue to be used at Bisley up into the 1970s with some success, and continue to perform extremely well at Military Service Rifle Competitions throughout the world.

Many people still hunt with as-issued Lee–Enfield rifles, with commercial .303 British ammunition proving especially effective on medium-sized game. Soft-point .303 ammunition is widely available for hunting purposes, though the Mark 7 military cartridge design often proves adequate because its tail-heavy design makes the bullet yaw violently and deform after hitting the target.

Rifle Factory Ishapore of India still manufactures a sporting/hunting rifle chambered in .315 with a Lee–Enfield action.

The Lee–Speed Sporter was a higher quality British made version of the Lee–Enfield.

The Lee–Enfield rifle is a popular gun for historic rifle enthusiasts and those who find the 10-round magazine, loading by charger clips, and the rapid bolt-action useful for Practical Rifle events. Since formation in 1998, organisations such as the Lee Enfield Rifle Association have assisted in not just preserving rifles in shooting condition (many Lee–Enfields are being deactivated and sold as "wall-hangers" to collectors who do not hold a Firearms Licence in countries where they are required), but holding events and competitions. Lee–Enfields are also popular with competitors in service rifle competitions in many Commonwealth countries.

The Lee–Enfield series is very popular for service rifle shooting competitions in the UK and Australia due to the prohibitions on the legal ownership of semi-automatic centrefire rifles in Great Britain and restrictions on the legal ownership of semi-automatic centrefire rifles in Australia. (For more information see Gun politics in the United Kingdom and Gun politics in Australia.)

=== Conversions ===
Rhineland Arms produces .45 ACP conversion kits for the Lee–Enfield action using M1911 pistol magazines.

Special Interest Arms created conversion kits for Lee–Enfield rifles, including Enfield .45-SC, Enfield K and Enfield .45 Carbines.

== Variants ==
- Magazine Lee–Enfield (MLE), .303, introduced 1895.
- Lee–Enfield cavalry carbine Mk I (LEC), .303, introduced 1896.
- Magazine Lee–Enfield Mk I*, .303, introduced 1899.
- Lee–Enfield cavalry carbine Mk I*, .303, introduced 1899.
- New Zealand carbine, .303
- Royal Irish Constabulary carbine, .303
- Short Magazine Lee–Enfield Mk I (SMLE), .303, introduced 1904.
- Short Magazine Lee–Enfield Mk II, .303, introduced 1906.
- Charger loading Lee–Enfield (CLLE), .303, introduced 1906.
- No. 1 Short Magazine Lee–Enfield Mk III, .303, introduced 1907.
- No. 1 Short Magazine Lee–Enfield Mk IV Cond, .303, converted from No. 1 Mk I, I*, II and II* rifles, introduced 1907.
- No. 1 Short Magazine Lee–Enfield Mk III*, .303, introduced 1915.
- No. 1 Short Magazine Lee–Enfield Mk III* (HT), .303, "Heavy Barrel, Telescopic Sight" Australian sniper rifle.
- No. 1 Short Magazine Lee–Enfield Mk V, .303, introduced 1922.
- No. 1 Short Magazine Lee–Enfield Mk VI, .303, introduced 1930.
- No. 2, .22, converted from .303 SMLE Mk III and Mk III*.
- No. 2 Mk IV, .22
- No. 2 Mk IV*, .22
- No. 4 Mk I, .303, introduced 1931.
- No. 4 Mk I (T), .303, sniper rifle converted from No. 4 Mk I, introduced 1941.
- No. 4 Mk I*, .303, introduced 1941.
- No. 4 Mk I* (T), .303, Sniper rifle converted from No. 4 Mk I*, introduced 1941.
- No. 4 Mk 2, .303, introduced 1949.
- No. 4 Mk I/2, .303, converted from No. 4 Mk I to No. 4 Mk 2 standard.
- No. 4 Mk I/3, .303, converted from No. 4 Mk I* to No. 4 Mk 2 standard.
- No. 5 Mk I, jungle carbine, .303, introduced 1944.
- No. 6 Mk I, .303, Australian experimental version of the No. 5 Mk I.
- No. 7, .22
- No. 8 Mk I, .22
- No. 9, .22
- RCAF survival rifle
- L8A1, 7.62 mm, converted from No. 4 Mk 2
- L8A2, 7.62 mm, converted from No. 4 Mk I/3
- L8A3, 7.62 mm, converted from No. 4 Mk I/3
- L8A4, 7.62 mm, converted from No. 4 Mk I
- L8A5, 7.62 mm, converted from No. 4 Mk I*
- L39A1, 7.62 mm
- L42A1, 7.62 mm
- L59A1, drill rifle, converted from No. 4.
- E.A.L. rifle, built by Essential Agencies Limited (E.A.L.)
- BA 93, a rifle grenade launcher made from surplus Lee–Enfield parts, which consist of stocks and receiver with a rifle grenade launcher in the chamber and a sheet metal buttstock while attaching a G3-type pistol grip.

== Users ==
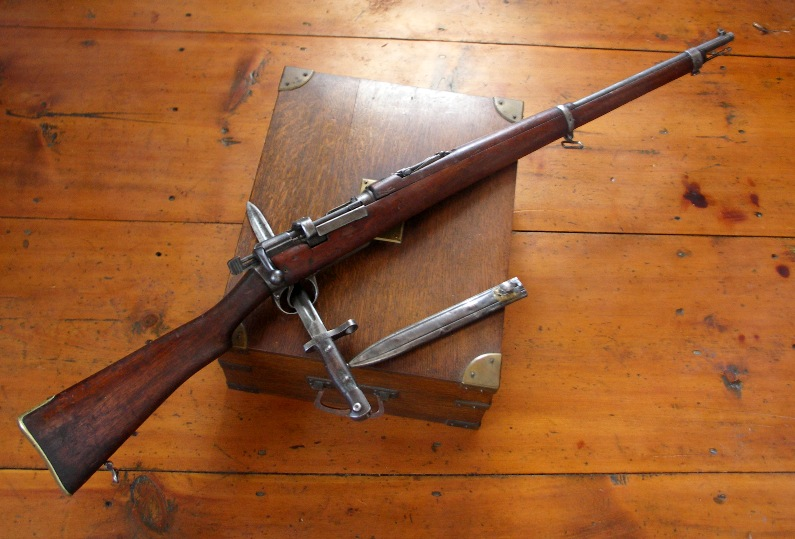
Turkish 8×57mm conversion of a Lee–Enfield captured during World War I

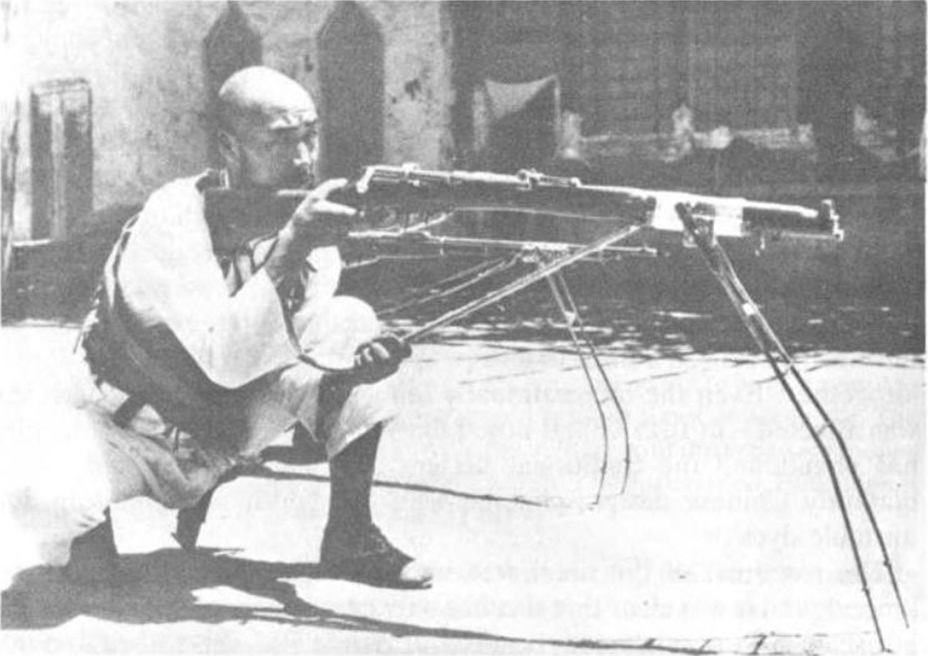
Hui rifleman of the New 36th Division with SMLE Lee–Enfield Rifle fitted with bipod

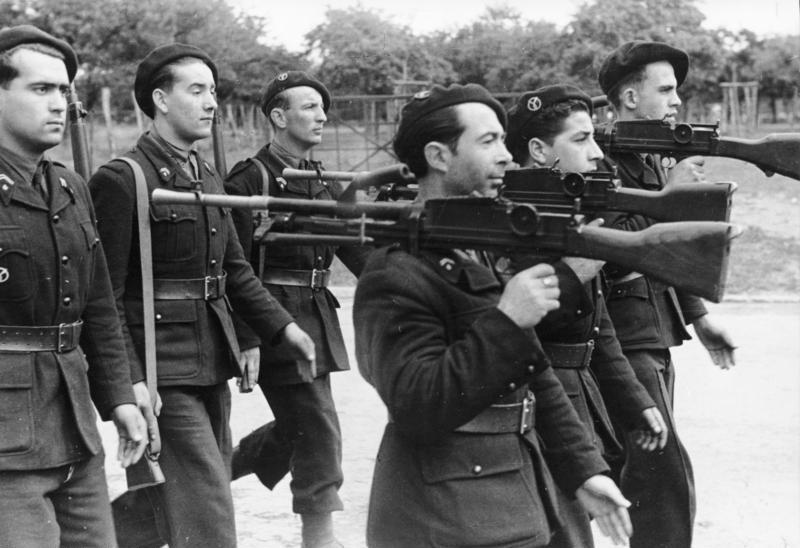
Members of the Milice of Vichy France, armed with captured British No. 4 Lee–Enfield Rifles and Bren guns

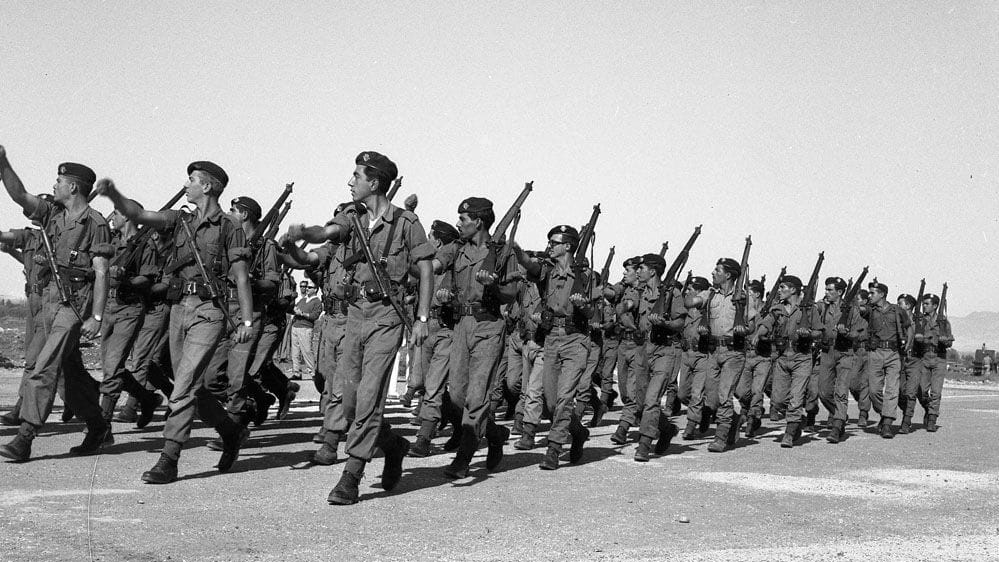
Unit of Cypriot National Guard with Sten Submachine guns and No. 4 Lee–Enfield Rifles in 1967

- Afghanistan
- Algeria
- Australia: No. 1 MkIII/MkIII* manufactured at Lithgow Arsenal in Lithgow, New South Wales
- Austria: used post WW2 by the Gendarmerie.
- Bangladesh: Extensively used during 1971 war. Used by Police, Ansar and BNCC personnel for several years. No longer in active service.
- Belgium: post-WW2 British and Canadian donations were used by Belgian soldiers in the Korean War until 1952. post WW2 used by the Belgian "Gendarmerie" until the 1980s, when it was replaced by the FN FAL.
- Belize
- Bermuda: used by the Bermuda Volunteer Rifle Corps
- Brunei: used by the Royal Brunei Armed Forces and Royal Brunei Police Force during the early days, replaced by M16 series.
- Botswana
- Canada: The No. 4 rifle was manufactured starting in 1941 by Small Arms Limited and later by Canadian Arsenals Limited, in Long Branch, Ontario, Canada. The Canadian Militia received the MK I Long Lee Enfield rifle in 1896. They used this rifle in the Boer War from 1899 to 1902. They used the Mk III & Mk III* in World War I, as well as the No. 4 Lee Enfield in World War II, the Korean War, and into the late 1950s. The No. 4 rifle is still used for drill and was used for range shooting by the Royal Canadian Army Cadets, Royal Canadian Sea Cadets and the Royal Canadian Air Cadets. Most units are stripped of the mechanism that fires the round but at many Cadet Training Centres the rifles are in full working order, the rifle is used at the Vernon Summer Training Center for Feu du joix. The No. 4 was being phased out by the Canadian Rangers as a service rifle starting in 2016.
- Newfoundland: Main service rifle in both World War I and World War II
- Cambodia: used by the Royal Khmer Army.
- Central African Republic
- Republic of China (1912–1949): used during Warlord Era. Some Chinese soldiers in Burma also received British Lee–Enfield No. 4 Mk Is.
- Cyprus: The Lee–Enfield was the main rifle of the Cypriot National Guard from 1960 when the Republic of Cyprus was established until 1980, when it was replaced by the G3A3.
- Denmark: used as Rifle M/45E by the Danish brigade in occupied Germany from 1945, eventually replaced by the US M1 rifle as Rifle M/50 in 1950.
- Kingdom of Egypt
- Ethiopian Empire: acquired after World War I.
- Finland: some stored in depots after the Finnish Civil War
- Fiji
- French Third Republic:
  - Free French Forces and French Resistance used it during World War II.
  - Some captured from the Resistance were used by the pro-Nazi French militia Milice française (see picture).
  - Some were used in Indochina.
- Gambia
- Nazi Germany: some captured No. 1 Mk III* Lee–Enfields were used by the Volkssturm in 1944 and 1945 The German designation was Gewehr 281 (e).
- Ghana: replaced in the 1960s by L1A1s.
- Greece: Used by Hellenic armed forces during World War II and post-World War II period. Greece used the Lee–Enfield and British small arms until they were replaced by the M1 Garand and American small arms.
- Guyana
- Hong Kong: Used by the Royal Hong Kong Regiment.
- Hungary
- Iceland:
- India: In service with British Indian Army throughout the First and Second World Wars.
- India: In service during the Indo-Pakistani War of 1965. Now made under licence by Rifle Factory Ishapore as the Ishapore 2A1 rifle, the rifle is still used by the Indian police and also assigned to civil militia named Village Defence Guards.
- Indonesia: Used by republicans in Indonesian National Revolution; some were handed down from the Dutch after they left Indonesia.
- Italy: post-World War II Italian Army and Navy
- Kingdom of Iraq. Still used in small numbers in 2004 by Iraqi insurgents.
- Ireland: No1 MkIII/III* used as the service rifle by the National Army during the Civil War and later by Defence Forces, replaced by No4 Lee–Enfields in 1950s until replaced by the FN FAL in 1961. The second line reserve, the Fórsa Cosanta Áitiúil (FCÁ) continued using the Lee–Enfield as its primary service rifle until 1990, when the FN FAL began to replace it.
- Israel: used during the first few years of independence.
- Jamaica: still used by the Jamaica Constabulary Force, Correctional Services and Jamaica Combined Cadet Force
- Empire of Japan: Captured from British Army during World War II.
- Jordan: Arab Legion used Mk III and No. 4 variants
- Katanga: bought for police force but also used by army
- Kenya
- Latvia
- Lesotho
- Libya
- Luxembourg: used by the Luxembourg detachment in the Korean War
- Malawi
- Malaysia also used by the Malayan National Liberation Army
- Malta
- Mato Grosso do Sul
- Myanmar: used by the Myanmar Army after the Burmese Independence and also by the Myanmar Police Force for ceremonial purposes
- Namibia: Non-governmental armed groups
- Nepal
- Netherlands: Both the Lee–Enfield No. 1 Mark III and No. 4 Mark I would be adopted in 1941 and serve until 1952, until replaced by the M1 Garand.
- New Zealand
- Nigeria: Used by the Nigeria Regiment and then by Nigerian Army.

- Biafra: Used by militias and Army

- Norway: Received from Allied airdrops to the resistance fighters during World War II and given by Britain to the Norwegian Brigade during the occupation of Germany in 1947. Returned to Britain in 1952 in exchange for P-17 rifles. A total of 24992 .303 rifles were in Norwegian inventory at the time. Replaced by M1 Garand and M1 carbines.
- Oman
- Ottoman Empire: Captured rifles, used as reserve weapons.
- Pakistan
- Papua New Guinea
- Poland: used by the Polish Armed Forces in the West
- Portugal: used by the Portuguese Expeditionary Corps, during the First World War The SMLE Mk III was still in service as m/917 during the 1940s.
- Rhodesia
- Rwanda
- Sierra Leone
- Singapore: reserve units until the late 1960s. Still used by Singapore Armed Forces Military Police Command for ceremonial purposes.
- Solomon Islands: used by the Royal Solomon Islands Police Force.
- Somalia
- Union of South Africa
- South Sudan
- South Yemen
- Spanish Republic
- Sudan
- Sri Lanka: Phased out in the late 1960s with the arrival of the L1A1 SLR.
- Swaziland
- Tanzania
- Tibet
- Thailand: (the contract was concluded on 10 December 1920 when the king received shipment of 10,000 rifles.)
- Tonga
- Trinidad & Tobago: Trinidad & Tobago Cadet Force
- Turkey: converted Ottoman-captured rifles to 7.92×57mm Mauser.
- Uganda
- United Arab Emirates
- United Kingdom: Used by British Armed Forces and Royal Ulster Constabulary
- United States: Used by units of the American Expeditionary Force attached to British and Australian units during the First World War. No. 4 Mk I/Mk I* rifles manufactured by Savage-Stevens Firearms under Lend-Lease for the British and Commonwealth forces during World War II. Some US Army units attached to British Commonwealth units in Burma during WWII were issued Lee–Enfield rifles on logistics grounds.
- Vanuatu
- Vietnam: Việt Minh captured Lee–Enfields from French forces
- South Vietnam
- Yemen
- Yugoslav Partisans
- Zambia

=== Non-state users ===
- Chadian FROLINAT
- Ireland: Used by Irish Republican Army during War of Independence. Lee–Enfield rifles were still in the arsenal of the Provisional IRA at the outset of The Troubles in Northern Ireland and were reportedly used in at least one INLA sniper attack as late as 1989.
- ISIL: Used by ISIL insurgents in 2019.

== See also ==
- List of clip-fed firearms
- Table of handgun and rifle cartridges
