= Martini–Enfield =

Martini–Enfield Mk I & Mk II
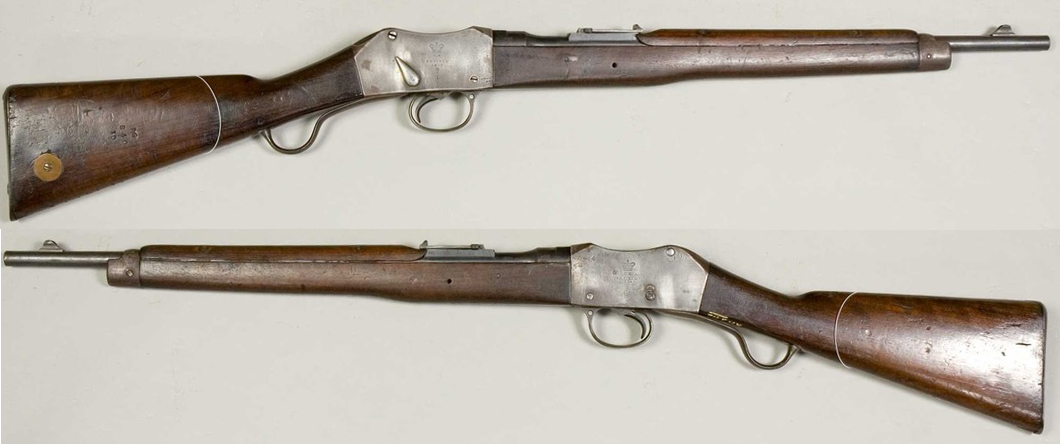
- Martini-Enfield carbine. From the Swedish Army Museum.
- Type: Service rifle
- Place of origin: United Kingdom

Service history
- In service: 1895–1918
- Used by: United Kingdom & Colonies; Afghanistan
- Wars: British colonial wars, Second Boer War (Limited); World War I (Limited)

Production history
- Designer: RSAF Enfield
- Designed: 1895
- Manufacturer: RSAF Enfield
- Produced: 1895–1903
- No. built: approx. 750,000
- Variants: Mk II Carbine

Specifications
- Mass: 8.5 pounds (3.9 kg) empty
- Length: 49.25 inches (1,251 mm)
- Barrel length: 30.2 inches (770 mm) (rifle); 21.3 inches (540 mm) (carbine)
- Cartridge: .303 Mk IIC SAA Ball
- Calibre: .303 British
- Action: Martini Falling Block
- Rate of fire: 10 rounds per minute
- Muzzle velocity: 2,200 feet per second (670 m/s)
- Effective firing range: 1,000 yards (910 m)
- Maximum firing range: 2,000 yards (1,800 m)
- Feed system: Single shot
- Sights: Sliding ramp rear sights, fixed-post front sights

Martini–Enfield rifles were, by and large, conversions of the .577/450 Martini–Henry rifle, rechambered for use with the newly introduced .303 British cartridge. Whilst most Martini–Enfields were converted rifles, a number were newly manufactured as well.

== Overview ==
The Martini–Enfield Mk I was a Martini–Henry Mk III rebarrelled to .303 and with a new extractor installed, whilst the Martini–Enfield Mk II rifles were generally of new manufacture, although there are examples of converted Mk II rifles.

Originally (from 1889) Martini–Henry conversions used Metford rifled barrels (and were known as Martini–Metford rifles), which were more than suitable for the first .303 cartridges, which used black powder as a propellant but wore out very quickly when fired with cordite/nitrocellulose cartridges (introduced in 1895). In 1895, the Enfield rifled barrel was introduced, which was much more suitable for use with cordite based smokeless ammunition.

The Martini–Enfield saw service with Australian colonial forces during the Second Anglo-Boer War (1899–1902).

The Martini–Enfield was in service from 1895–1918 (Lawrence of Arabia's Arab Irregulars were known to have used them during the Arab Revolt of 1916–1918, along with any other firearms they could acquire) and it remained a Reserve Arm in places like India and New Zealand until well into World War II.

Martini–Enfield rifles were manufactured/converted by:

- RSAF (Royal Small Arms Factory), Enfield Lock
- LSA Co (London Small Arms Co)
- BSA & M Co (Birmingham Small Arms & Metals Co, later simply BSA)
- HRB Co (Henry Rifle Barrel Co, later went out of business and taken over by Blenheim Engineering)
- NA&A Co (National Arms & Ammunition Co)

Martini–Enfield rifles were very well made and are more than capable of handling modern commercial .303 British ammunition, but, as with all second hand firearms, they should always be checked by a competent gunsmith before attempting to fire them. In advance to the Mk VII spitzer bullet introduction, a Mk III proof round with 20% higher pressure was introduced in 1908; rifles modified earlier and proven with previous marks may have a modified blackpowder-era breech block slightly weakened with the insertion of a new face, but the rifles with newly made breech blocks should withstand even WWII military surplus ammo.

== Khyber Pass copies ==
The Khyber Pass region between Pakistan and Afghanistan has long had a reputation for producing unlicensed, home-made copies of firearms using whatever materials are available-more often than not, railway sleepers, junked motor vehicles, and scrap metal.

During the various British military expeditions in the North-West Frontier, the locals acquired examples of the Martini–Henry, Martini–Enfield, and later, Lee Metford and Lee–Enfield rifles and began to make their own copies.

The quality of such rifles varies from "As good as a factory-produced example" to "dangerously unsafe", tending towards the latter end of the scale. The ammunition used in the region is often underloaded, being made from a variety of powders—or even old film (which contains nitrocellulose, prior to the introduction of safety film stocks; a key component of smokeless powder). As such, Khyber Pass Copy rifles cannot generally stand up to the pressures generated by modern commercial ammunition, because of the significant possibility of severe injury or death to the operator it is generally advised that such weapons should not be fired under any but the most extremely unlikely rare and desperate circumstances, although some collectors have made mild handloaded cartridges for their Khyber Pass rifles. This practice is not recommended, and anyone firing a Khyber Pass rifle is doing so at their own risk.

Khyber Pass Copies can be recognised by a number of factors, notably:

- Spelling errors in the markings (the most common of which is a backwards "N" in "Enfield")
- V.R. (Victoria Regina) cyphers dated after 1901—Queen Victoria died in 1901, so any rifles made after this should be stamped "E.R." (Edward Rex, referring to King Edward VII)
- Generally inferior workmanship, including weak/soft metal, poorly finished wood, and badly struck markings.

Many different versions of the original Enfield rifles are on sale at UN, United States or NATO-authorized bazaars usually adjacent to or within military or diplomatic installations in Afghanistan. Until that time, it was common to find a great variety of 'Khyber pass' fake weapons. These ranged a gamut of Martini–Henrys, Snider-converted original Enfield pattern 1853s, blatant knockoffs of the Martini–Henry rifles that lacked all British markings completely and were often engraved with popular Middle Eastern geometric and scrollwork designs. After the limitations regarding the loading method cut the supply of these being brought into bazaars went into effect, many of the vendors simply resorted to bringing fake muzzle-loading British pattern 1853 'Tower' rifles to sell as send-home replicas. While some vendors may claim them to be made by Enfield, most usually make no claim at all regarding their authenticity.
