= Lee–Speed =

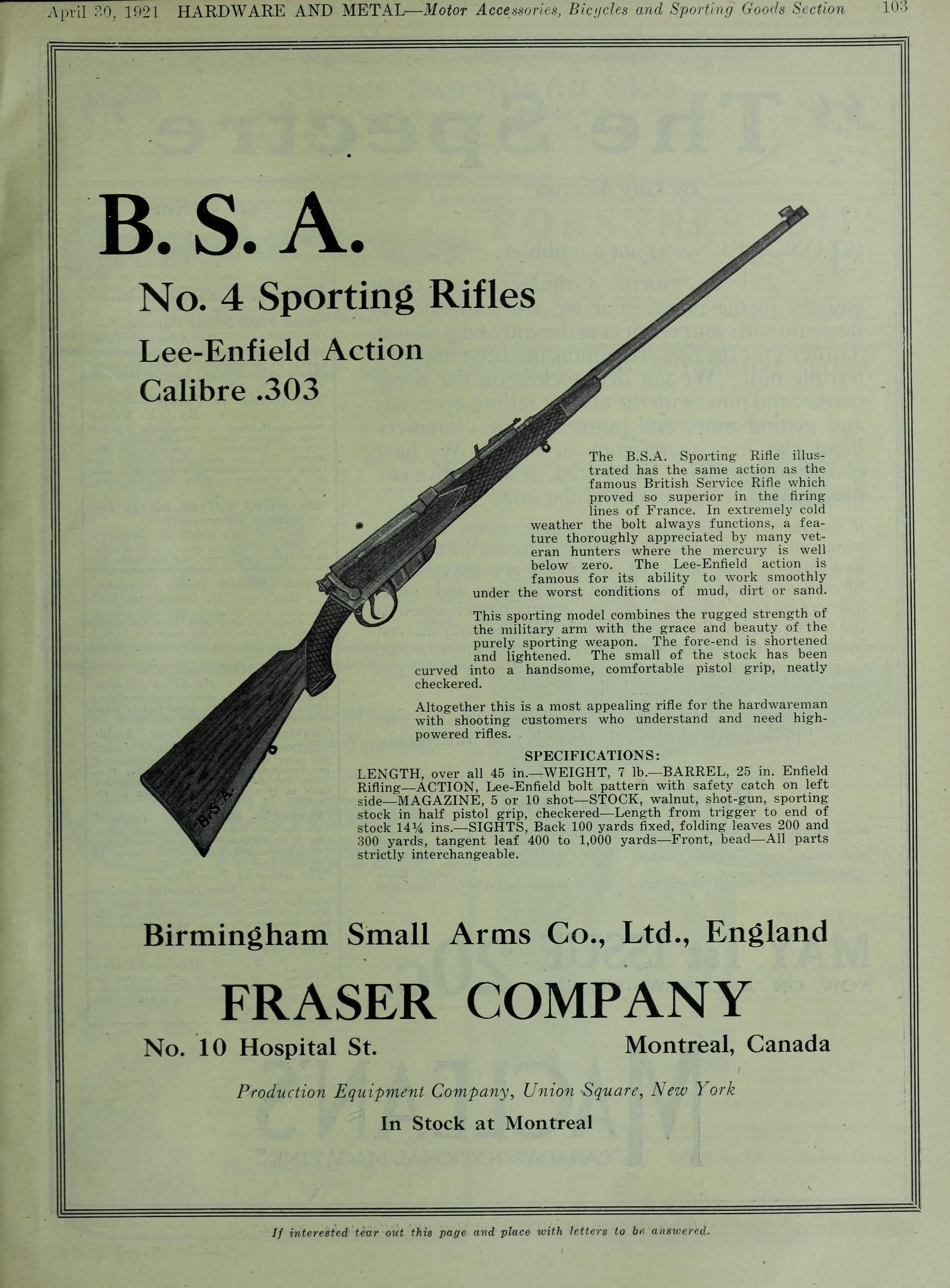
- Type: Bolt-action rifle
- Place of origin: United Kingdom

Service history
- Wars: Second Boer War, World War I, World War II

Production history
- Designer: James Paris Lee
- Manufacturer: RSAF Enfield; Birmingham Small Arms Company

Specifications
- Length: 49.5 in (1,260 mm)
- Barrel length: 30.2 in (770 mm)
- Cartridge: .303 British Mk I
- Calibre: 0.312 in (7.9 mm)
- Action: Bolt-action
- Rate of fire: 24 rounds/minute
- Muzzle velocity: 2,040 ft/s (620 m/s)
- Effective firing range: ~1 mile (1,800 yd)
- Maximum firing range: 1 mile (1,800 yd)
- Feed system: 5 or 10-round magazine
- Sights: Sliding leaf rear sights, Fixed-post front sights

The Lee–Speed rifle was a bolt-action rifle based on James Paris Lee's rear-locking bolt system and detachable magazine. Early models were fitted with barrels using the radiused rifling designed by William Ellis Metford. while later models used the same square "Enfield" rifling as contemporary British military rifles.

The weapon was a sporting variant of the well known Lee–Metford and Lee–Enfield rifles, made for civilian shooters, though often purchased by Army officers who wanted a rifle made to a higher standard of fit and finish than the issued military rifle.

== Variants ==
=== No.1 ===
Officers pattern, with bayonet mount.

=== No.2 ===
Officers pattern, without bayonet mount.

=== No.3 ===
Trade pattern.
