= London Small Arms Co. Ltd =

Defunct British arms manufacturer

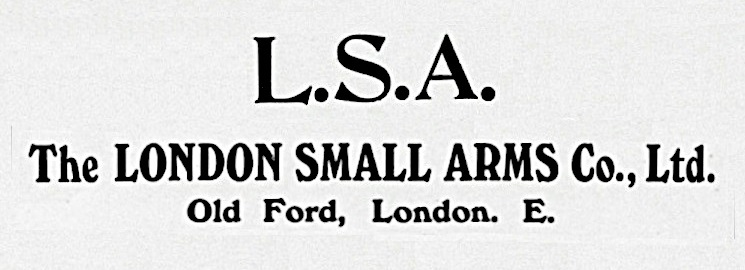

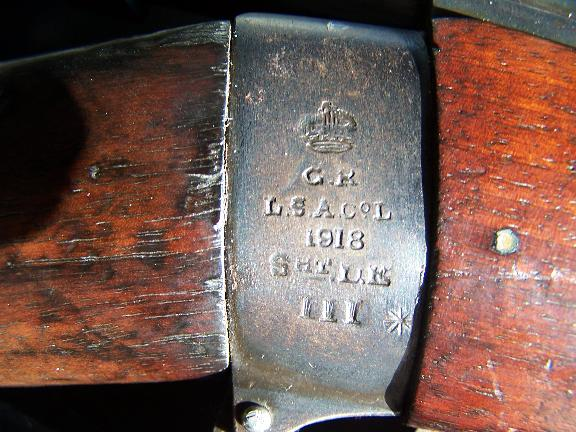
Wristguard markings on a 1918-dated Short Magazine Lee–Enfield Mk III* rifle manufactured by the London Small Arms Co. Ltd.

The London Small Arms Company Ltd (LSA Co) was a British Arms Manufacturer from 1866 to 1935.

Based in the London Borough of Tower Hamlets, LSA Co was formed to compete against the Royal Small Arms Factory (RSAF) at Enfield by the gunsmiths who made up the London Armoury Company, which had gone out of business as a result of the end of the US Civil War.

Like their counterparts at Birmingham Small Arms Company (BSA), LSA Co were contractors to the British armed forces and produced many British service rifles, notably the Martini–Henry, Martini–Enfield, and Short Magazine Lee–Enfield rifles. They also produced sporting arms and shotguns for the civilian market.

Unlike BSA and RSAF, however, LSA Co never achieved high levels of production, preferring to focus on maintaining a greater level of workmanship on their firearms. LSA Co guns are highly regarded by collectors of British military firearms because of their workmanship, which has led most of the existing and surviving LSA Co guns to be in (generally) better condition than their contemporaries from other manufacturers.

The market for military and civilian arms dropped markedly in the inter-war years, and LSA Co closed down in 1935, unable to compete with the more efficient factories of BSA Co and RSAF Enfield.
