= List of British military equipment of World War II =

The following is a list of British military equipment of World War II which includes artillery, vehicles and vessels. This also would largely apply to Commonwealth of Nations countries in World War II like Australia, India and South Africa as the majority of their equipment was British as they were at that time influenced or controlled by the British Empire. However commonwealth countries did make their own unique weapons like the Owen gun and Vickers–Berthier.

== Uniforms/protective equipment ==
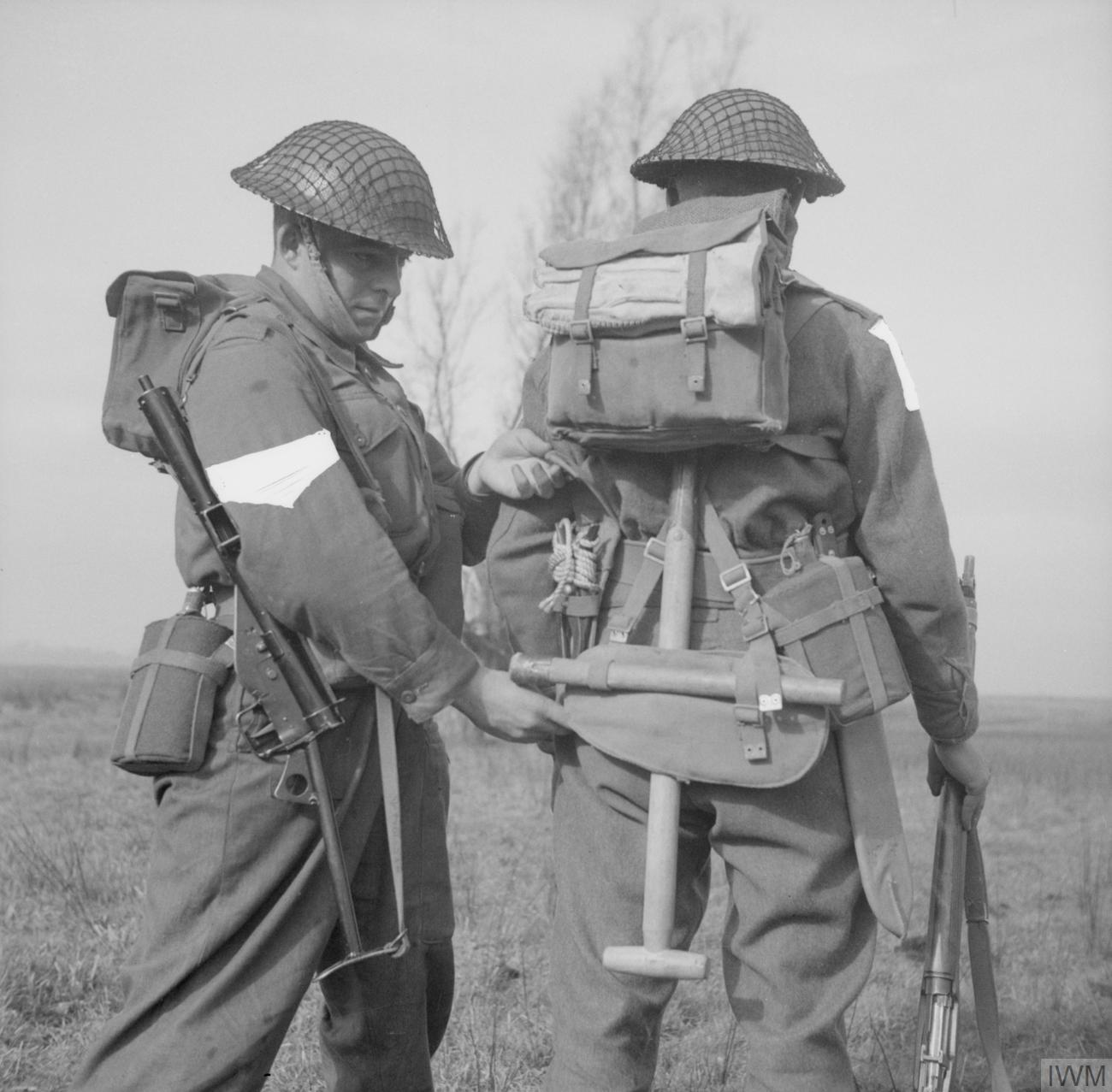
Two British soldiers in battledress with 1937 webbing wearing "Steel Helmet MKll" helmets

- MKl*, and MKll “steel or bowl style helmet” - both the MKl* and Mkll helmet were introduced in 1938
- Mk III "Turtle" helmet - introduced in 1944
- Helmet Steel Airborne Troop - for airborne forces
- Denison smock - for airborne forces
- Beret - the beret was introduced in place of the Field service cap for some units with specific colours for some units
  - Green beret - worn by British Commandos
  - Maroon beret - from 1942 by airborne forces
  - Tan beret - Special Air Service from 1942 till 1944
  - Black beret - by armoured units, including the Royal Tank Corps from 1924
- Service Dress - the field uniform at the start of the war until replaced by battledress
- Battledress ("Uniform No. 5")
- 1937 pattern web equipment
- Battle Jerkin
- Khaki Drill - worn by British troops in Far East, Middle East, Mediterranean and North Africa.
- Greatcoat, Dismounted, 1939 pattern - A heavyweight khaki fabric worn by British soldiers in colder areas

== Knives and bayonets ==
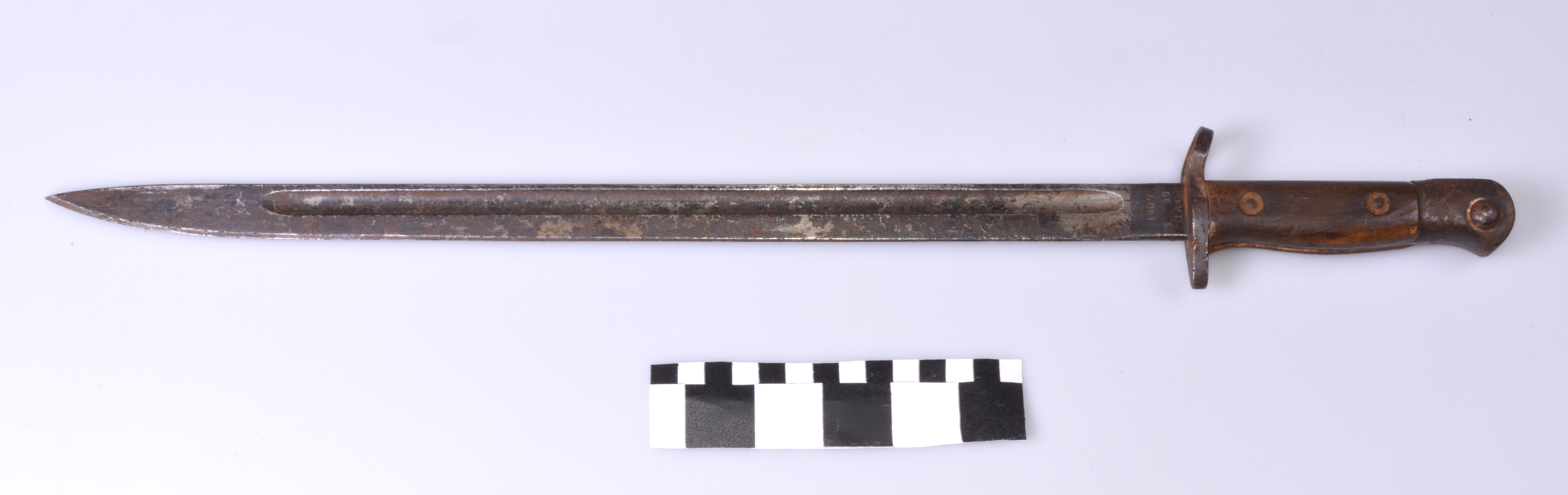
- Pattern 1907 bayonet which was the standard bayonet for the SMLE No 1 mk III which was the standard British rifle in WWII till 1941 when the SMLE No 4 mk I was introduced which replaced it.
  Pattern 1907 bayonet
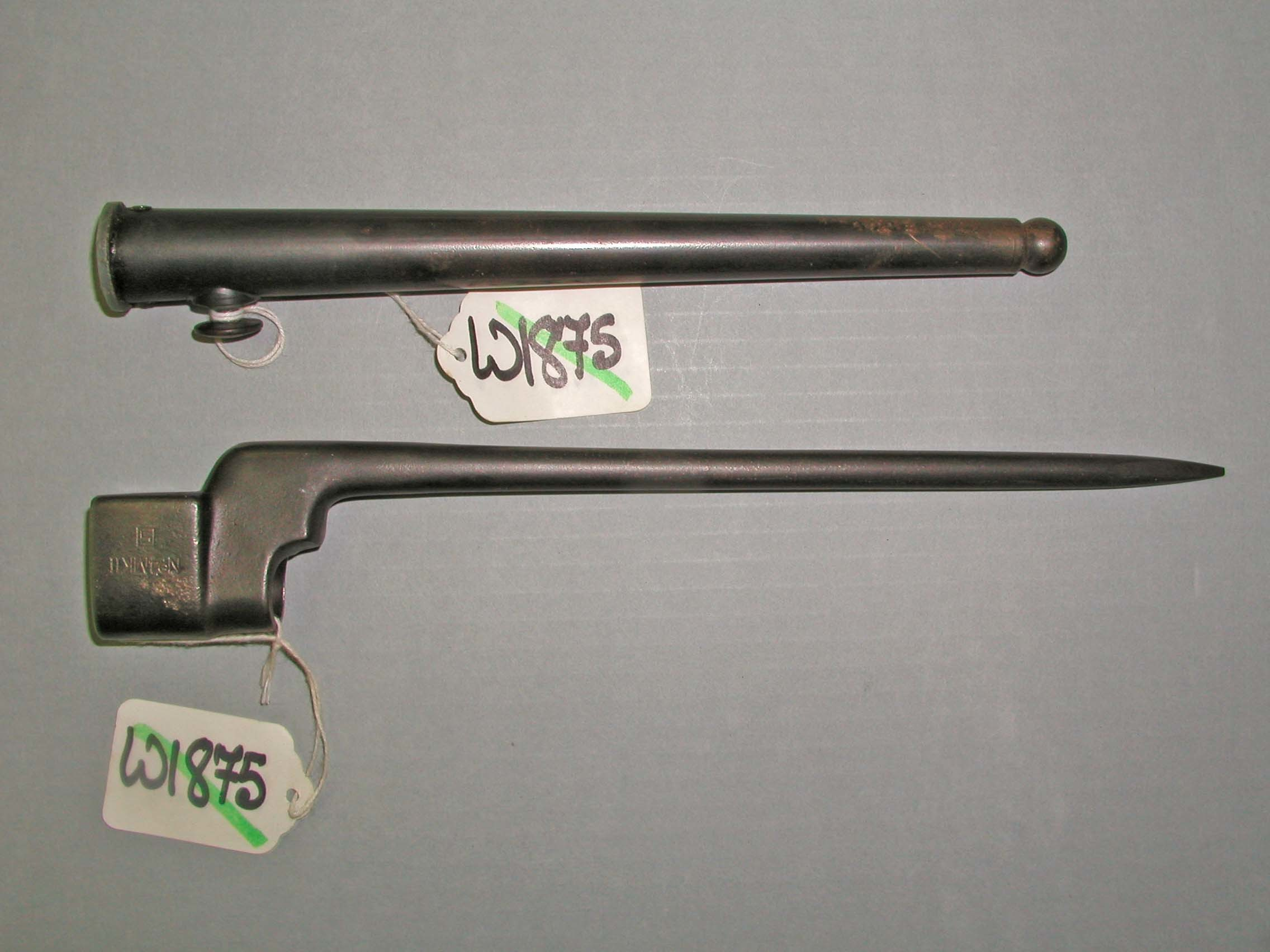
- No. 4 Bayonet which was the standard bayonet for late war Enfield No. 4 mk I rifle.
  No. 4 Bayonet
- Sten bayonet mk I-Sten mk II
- No. 5 Bayonet
- No. 7 Bayonet-Sten mk V
- Push dagger
- BC-41
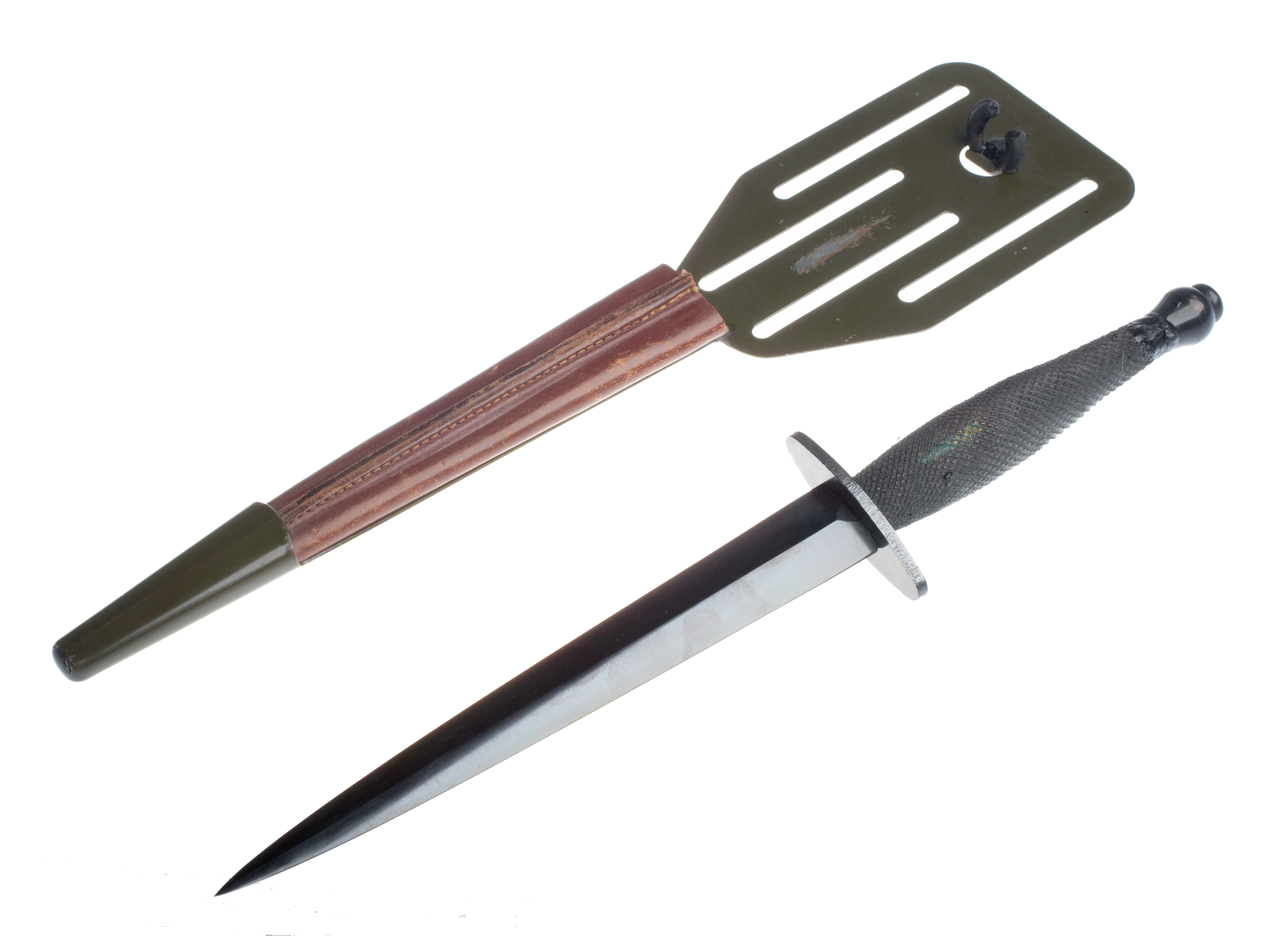
- Fairbairn-Sykes fighting knife made famous by British special forces.
  Fairbairn–Sykes fighting knife
- Smatchet
- Dickinson commando knife
- Bayonet
- Kukri

== Weapons ==
- List of World War II weapons of the United Kingdom

== Vehicles ==
- British Commonwealth armoured fighting vehicles of World War II
- British armoured fighting vehicle production during World War II
- See also: List of World War II military vehicles by country#United Kingdom

== Naval ships ==
- List of Classes of British ships of World War II
- List of requisitioned trawlers of the Royal Navy (WWII)

== Naval equipment ==
- List of Royal Navy and other British naval forces military equipment of World War II

== Aircraft ==
- List of aircraft of the United Kingdom in World War II
- Naval aircraft
  - List of Fleet Air Arm aircraft in World War II
- Equipment of RAF bombers
  - List of equipment of RAF Bomber Command aircraft of World War II

== Radar ==
- Ground
  - Chain Home, early warning radar
  - Chain Home Low
  - AMES Type 7
  - GL Mk. I radar, gun laying radar for anti-aircraft batteries
  - GL Mk. III radar, gun laying radar for anti-aircraft batteries
- Aircraft
  - Monica (radar), tail warning radar fitted to bombers
  - H2S (radar), ground scanning radar fitted to bombers
  - AI Mk. IV radar, airborne interception radar fitted to fighters
  - AI Mk. VIII radar, airborne interception radar fitted to fighters
  - ASV Mark II radar
  - ASV Mark III radar
- Naval
  - List of World War II British naval radar

== Missiles and bombs ==
=== Aerial bombs ===
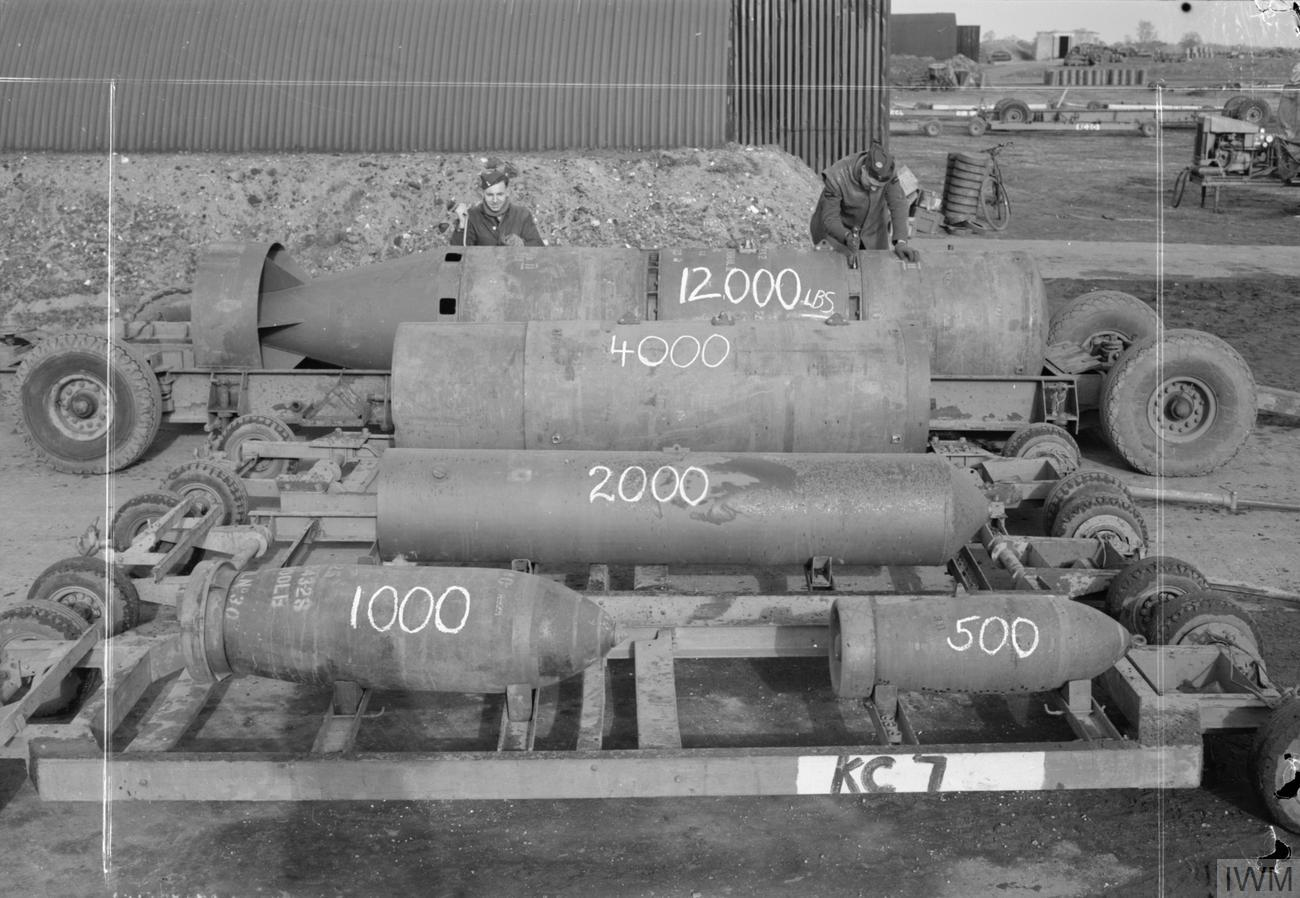
British aerial bombs: 2000lb, 4000lb and 12000lb blockbusters, 1000lb and 500lb GP bombs

- Fire balloons
- "Bouncing bombs"
  - Upkeep
  - Highball
- Gas bombs
- Smoke bombs
- Tallboy bomb
- Grand Slam bomb
- Blockbuster bombs
- Disney bomb

== Cartridges and shells ==
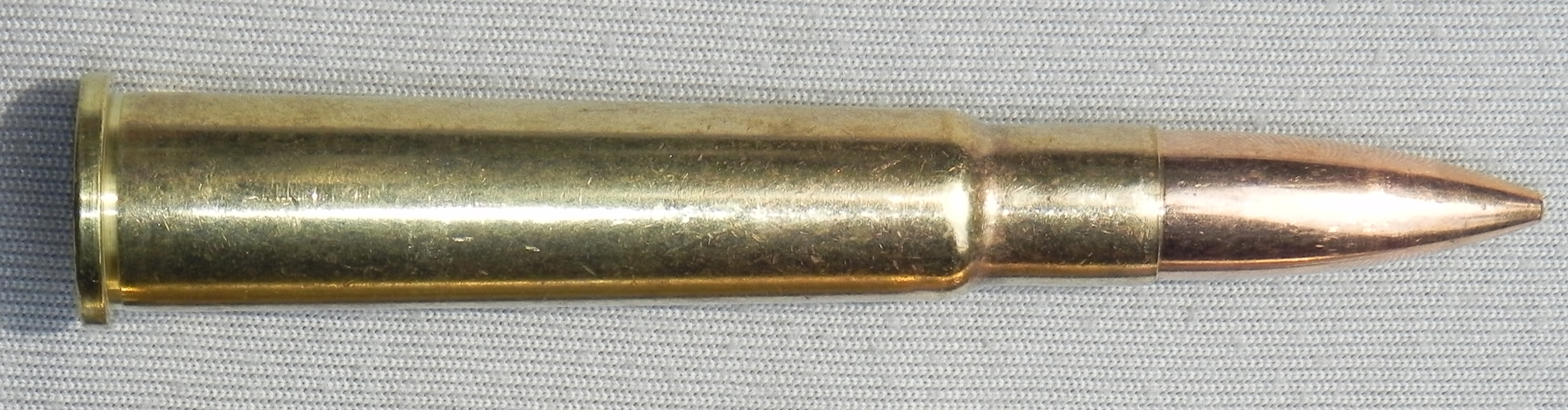
.303 British cartridge for British rifles and machine guns

- .303 British for standard issue rifles and light machine guns
- .32 ACP for Welrod pistols
- .38 S&W for standard issue revolvers
- 9×19mm Parabellum for standard issue submachine guns
- .455 Webley for substitute standard and older service revolvers
- .45 ACP for Lend Lease Thompsons and the De Lisle carbine
- .55 Boys for the Boys anti-tank rifle
- 7.92×57mm Mauser for the Besa machine gun used in British tanks

== See also ==
- List of equipment used in World War II
- List of common World War II infantry weapons
- List of secondary and special-issue World War II infantry weapons
