= Keith D. Black =

American screenwriter

- Born: Keith D. Black, also known as Dorian Black and The Honorable Keith D. Black; October 16, 1980 (age 45); Johannesburg, South Africa
- Citizenship: United States
- Education: University of Wisconsin King William's College American Film Institute Harvard University
- Occupations: Screenwriter, producer, former model
- Years active: 1998 - present
- Relatives: Roy Keith Black, Member of the Order of the British Empire Baroness Oppenheim-Barnes, Peer to the Privy Council of the United Kingdom The Right Honourable Phillip Oppenheim The Right Honourable Dame Jill Black Phil Solomon (music executive) of Major Minor Records Mervyn Solomon, founder of Emerald Music and Officer of Order of the British Empire Harold Peres of Solomon and Peres, Officer of Order of the British Empire Sir Adolph Weiner of Viners Master Simon Geoghegan of the House of Ireland

Keith D. Black (born October 16, 1980) is a financier, screenwriter and former DNA magazine model, who was born in South Africa and grew up from a young age in San Diego, California. He has dual citizenship in the United Kingdom and the United States. He is best known as the heir apparent to the Black family, described in the early 1990s as one of Great Britain's most influential entertainment and political dynasties.

Black is recognized for co-writing Princess (2006) and House of God (2008). He is the COO of an asset management firm.

== Early life ==
Black was born in Johannesburg, South Africa in 1980; his father Anthony Black was born in Ireland and his mother Michele (Blumberg) Black in South Africa. He has an older sister Tracy. In the early 1980s, when Keith was a young child, his family immigrated to San Diego, California with the family business. Black grew up there and attended King William's College (Colleish Ree Illiam in Manx) the highly affluent International Baccalaureate HMC school situated near Castletown on the Isle of Man. Black attended the University of Wisconsin, where he graduated. He later earned an MFA from The American Film Institute in Los Angeles, California. He also earned a business degree from Harvard University and joined his father in a financial firm.

His paternal grandfather Roy Keith Black (deceased) was the managing director in the 1950s of a UK public company specializing in television rentals. He later helped to establish broadcasting in Southern Africa. In San Diego, where he moved in 1982, he owned and operated Video Library, which later became Blockbuster Inc. Keith Black's paternal grandmother, Maureen Black (née Peres) is the daughter of Harold Peres, a UK and Ireland music producer and record distributor, with Solomon and Peres. In 1981, Solomon and Peres was acquired by Decca Records.

In 1918, Black's mother's family began Blumberg Export and Import, a small timber business in South Africa. Eventually, it developed as the largest timber manufacturer in continental Africa. A portion of downtown Johannesburg is named after Black's maternal great-grandparents.

Black is the cousin to both Phil Solomon (music executive), and Mervyn Solomon, founder of Emerald Music, as well as cousin to British politicians, Baroness Oppenheim-Barnes and Phillip Oppenheim, House of Common's Conservative MP. In 1993 The London Times featured an article on Black's grandfather, Roy Keith Black and his political and entertainment influence on British Pop Culture for over 50 years. It described the extended Black family, together with the Solomons and Oppenheims, as one of the most influential dynasties in Great Britain.

Anthony Black worked in film and television distribution before becoming Senior Vice President and co-chairman of the Director's Board of Smith Barney. From 1972 to 1981, Anthony Black ran International Distribution for Norman Lear's Tandem Productions. He was considered a pioneer in South Africa Broadcasting, distributing All in the Family, Maude (1972–1978), Good Times (1974–1979), and Sanford and Son (1972–1977) to Apartheid South Africa.

== Modeling career ==
Black was frequently used to showcase swimwear apparel.

== Film career ==
In 2004 while attending the American Film Institute in Los Angeles, Black met Jessica Janos, another graduate student. They partnered on several small projects, most notably the short film, Princess (2006). Co-written by the two, it features the daughter of a black maid who is raised by a wealthy white South African family in Johannesburg.

Their film attracted the attention of Fred Roos. Janos helped to raise close to $500,000 to fund the short. Black and Janos shot their film in both Los Angeles and Johannesburg, which added to the cost of the project. It was featured in Daily Variety and The Los Angeles Times as "the most expensive student film ever made," and Black and Janos were criticized for their high production costs. The film earned praise after being shown.

Black discovered the woman to play the lead while shopping in Los Angeles, when he saw Benu Mabhena. She later acted in the feature film Blood Diamond (2006), playing the role of Jassie Vandy, the wife of Djimon Hounsou.

In 2011, it was announced that Black would executive produce, Janos' film, Prettyface, along with Fred Roos. The independent film explores the lives of two teenagers in Los Angeles. While stealing a horse from a stable, they meet Charles Manson, three days before he murders Sharon Tate in the sensational crime of the 1970s. Production of Prettyface was scheduled to begin in spring of 2013.

== Financial career ==
In 2011, Black was described as Chief Operating Officer (COO) of an alternative asset management firm. He had earned a business degree and joined his father Anthony Black in financial firm, specializing in clients with at least $1 million to invest.
