= Keith Black =

Keith Black may refer to:

- Keith Black (surgeon) (born 1957), American neurosurgeon
- Keith Black (engineer) (1926–1991), American drag-racing engineer
- Keith D. Black (born 1980), British-American financier, screenwriter and former model
