= No. 7 Bayonet =

- Type: Bayonet
- Place of origin: United Kingdom

Service history
- Used by: United Kingdom
- Wars: World War II

Production history
- No. built: 176,000

Specifications
- Length: 311 mm (12.2 in)
- Blade length: 200 mm (7.9 in)

The No. 7 Bayonet was a bayonet primarily used with the Sten Mk V submachine gun. However, it could be used on the No. 4 Lee-Enfield, but only for ceremonial purposes as the bayonet obstructed the path of the .303 round fired from the rifle.

== Design ==
The No. 7 bayonet was an advanced design that could be configured as either a blade or socket type bayonet, and could also be used as a fighting knife. It was intended to replace the No. 4 Bayonet in service and used the blade of the No. 5 Bayonet.

== Production ==
The design was finalized by Wilkinson Sword, who made 1,000 in 1944. The No. 7 bayonet went into mass production in 1945 and stayed in production for a short time post-war. As a majority of production of this design was post-war, it was mainly produced by government weapons factories due to spare capacity at the end of the war. The majority were made by the Royal Ordnance Factory, Newport who made 100,000. The Royal Ordanance Factory Poole made 30,000. Birmingham Small Arms Company, the famous weapons company who manufactured the Besa machine gun and Welrod Silenced pistol, made 25,000. One producer, which was not a weapons company, was Elkington & Co., traditionally a maker of silver products, made 20,000. Overall, 176,000 No. 7 bayonets were produced.
