= Roy Keith Black =

British businessman (1927–2009)

Roy Black
- Born: Roy Black; 30 October 1927; London, England, UK
- Died: 28 December 2009 (aged 82); San Diego, California, USA
- Monuments: The Black Family Law Library, California Western School of Law
- Education: King William's College Trinity College, Dublin
- Employer: Electronic Rental Group Video Library Blockbuster LLC Major Minor Records
- Board member of: Blockbuster LLC Video Library California Western School of Law Mingei International Museum Granada Limited
- Relatives: The Right Honourable Baroness Oppenheim-Barnes, Privy Council of the United Kingdom The Right Honourable Phillip Oppenheim The Right Honourable Dame Jill Black Phil Solomon (music executive) of Major Minor Records Mervyn Solomon, founder of Emerald Music and Officer of the Most Excellent Order of the British Empire Sir Adolph Weiner of Viners Cutlery
- Awards: Honorary Juris Doctor, California Western School of Law Member of the Most Excellent Order of the British Empire

Roy Black (30 October 1927 – 28 December 2009) was a British-born businessman, known for his work at Electronic Rentals Group, a UK public company during the 1960s in Dublin, Ireland specialising in television rentals. By 1970, ERG was the world's second largest Electronic Rental Company in the world with operations in 22 countries. From 1967 to 1973, ERG owned Gola and the Leisure Division was run by Alan Christopher Cowell MC along with companies like Camping Gaz Gola Sporting Goods.

He is the nephew of Sir Adolph Weiner of Viners Cutlery, who headed a prominent silversmith family in Sheffield and was knighted by the British monarchy. His wife, Maureen Black (née Peres) is the daughter of Harold Peres, legendary music producer and record distributor of Solomon and Peres, a UK and Northern Ireland based company which later was acquired by Decca Records. In 1986, The Independent Broadcasting Authority (IBA) invited private sector companies to apply for a new television franchise via satellite. In an attempt to win the bid and operate The Direct Broadcasting by Satellite System, Electronic Rentals Group was acquired by Granada Limited for an estimated £450M. The acquisition helped Granada Television to be awarded the fifteen-year franchise.

In 1978, Black with his adult son Anthony Black and family moved to Johannesburg, South Africa to help establish broadcasting throughout Southern Africa. In 1978, Black's ERG subsidiary, Vision Hire, along with King Sobhuza II of Swaziland, founded the Swaziland Television Broadcasting Corporation (STBC). From 1978 to 1979, the Swaziland Government positioned television satellites toward South Africa to provide anti-Apartheid broadcasting to South Africa. Black was considered a silent player in the fight against Apartheid. In 1983, the government of the Kingdom of Swaziland nationalised Black's privately owned company. The company had a monopoly in all television gadgets or equipment, as a result, the government also acquired and operated Vision Hire. With the change of the television station from STBC to STVA, the name of Vision Hire was changed to the Swaziland Television Authority Rentals (STAR).

== Later years ==
In 1982, Black moved to San Diego, California, US, where he owned and operated Video Library, which later became known as Blockbuster Inc. In retirement, he served as a member of the board of directors of the Mingei International Museum and was California Western School of Law's chairman of the board of Trustees from 1991 to 1994, and continued to serve as chairman Emeritus. In 1995, he was awarded an Honorary Juris Doctor. Later that year, California Western School of Law opened the Black Family Law Library in his honour.

His wife, Maureen, is the cousin to Phil Solomon of Major Minor Records and Mervyn Solomon MBE, founder of Emerald Music. In 1970, Black and Solomon sold Major Minor Records to the EMI Group for a reported £10M. For many years, Black and the Solomon Brothers were among the largest shareholders of Decca Records.

In 1993, The London Times featured an article on Black, the Solomon brothers, and the Oppenheim family, discussing their influence and pioneering success in British politics and British Pop Culture for over 50 years. The Times described them as one of the most influential dynasties in Great Britain.
