= Ishapore 2A1 rifle =

RFI Rifle 7.62mm 2A/2A1 (aka Ishapore 2A/2A1)
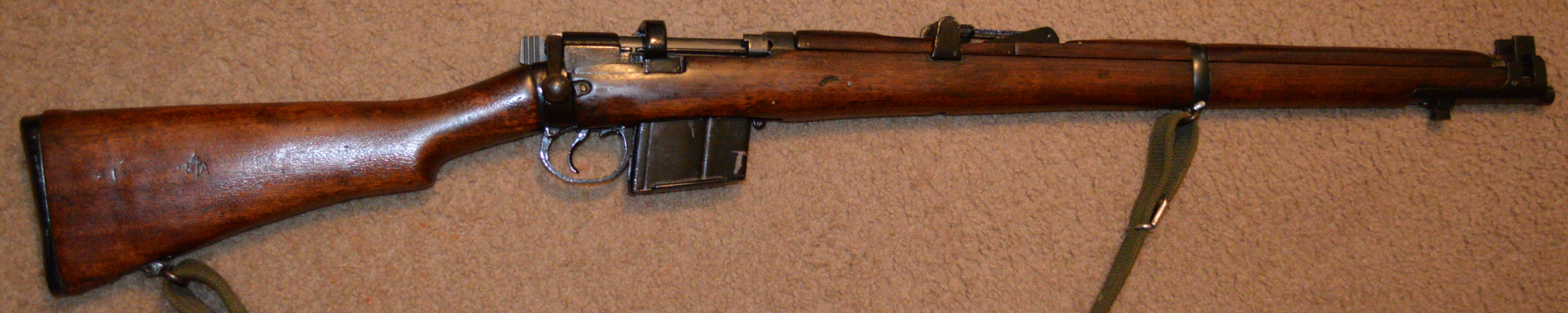
- Ishapore 2A1 rifle
- Type: Bolt-action rifle
- Place of origin: India

Service history
- In service: 1963–present
- Used by: See Users
- Wars: Indo-Pakistan Wars; Sino-Indian War; Bangladesh Liberation War

Production history
- Designer: Rifle Factory Ishapore
- Designed: 1962
- Manufacturer: Ordnance Factories Board
- Produced: 1962–1974
- No. built: 250,000
- Variants: 2A (2000 yd sights); 2A1 (800 m sights)

Specifications
- Mass: 4.7 kg (10.4 lb), unloaded
- Length: 44.5 in (1130 mm)
- Barrel length: 25 in (640 mm)
- Cartridge: 7.62×51mm NATO
- Action: Bolt action
- Rate of fire: 20–30 rounds/minute
- Muzzle velocity: 792 m/s (2,600 ft/s)
- Effective firing range: 800 m (875 yd)
- Maximum firing range: 2,000 m (2,187 yd)
- Feed system: 10- or 12-round magazine, loaded with 5-round charger clips
- Sights: Sliding ramp rear sights, fixed-post front sights

The Rifle 7.62mm 2A/2A1 (also known as the Ishapore 2A/2A1) is a 7.62×51mm NATO calibre bolt-action rifle adopted as a reserve arm by the Indian Armed Forces in 1963. The rifle is a variant of the Lee–Enfield rifle. The design of the rifle – initially the Rifle 7.62mm 2A – began at the Rifle Factory Ishapore of the Ordnance Factories Board in India, soon after the Sino-Indian War of 1962.

The Ishapore 2A/2A1 has the distinction of being the last bolt-action rifle designed to be used by a regular military force other than specialized sniper rifles. While it is no longer in service with the Indian military, the rifle is still used on occasion by the Indian police.

== History ==
The 2A was widely used by the Indian Army after the Sino-Indian War in 1962, despite the use of the SLR after 1965. 2A rifles were previously supplied to Bangladesh during the Bangladesh Liberation War.

The weapon was produced at a rate between 22,000 and 115,000 rifles annually, averaging 70,000 a year. Around 250,000 rifles were made in total before production ended in 1974.

== Development ==
Production of the 2A/2A1 started in 1962 after the SMLE Mk IIIs* was phased out of service with the Indian military. The Indian-made SMLE Mk IIIs are known as the Type 56, made between 1956 and 1965 although any rifles made in the latter are rare due to the transition to the 2A.

Externally, the Ishapore 2A/2A1 rifle is based upon (and is almost identical to) the .303 British calibre SMLE Mk III* rifle, with the exception of the distinctive "square" (10 or 12 round) magazine and the use of the buttplate from the 1A (Indian version of the FN FAL) rifle. The bolt and receiver were made out of nickel steel.

The 2A was designed to allow the British Pattern 1907 (P'07) sword bayonet used on the SMLE MkIII to be attached. Other differences included the use of improved steel (to handle the increased pressures of the 7.62mm NATO round), and a redesigned extractor for use with the rimless round.

The original (2A) design incorporated the Lee–Enfield rear sight which has graduations out to 2000 yards. The re-designated "Rifle 7.62mm 2A1" utilized a more realistic 800 meter rear sight in 1965. The stock is recycled from the No. 1 Mk. III armory stock, with the addition of a cross screw forward of the magazine well. The stock is made from mahogany wood, which makes them slightly heavier than a SMLE.

Some stocks were salvaged from existing surplus and show artificer repairs where rotted or damaged wood has been replaced. This repair is especially evident with the recoil draws (the area the receiver contacts when recoiling after the shot) that often failed over time due to the rifle being rack-stored butt down / muzzle up, which allowed oils and grease to migrate downwards into this critical area.

== Variants ==
=== Ishapore 2A rifle ===
The original production rifle has a sight range of 2000 meters.

=== Ishapore 2A1 rifle ===
A second production variant with a sight range of 800 meters.

=== IOF .315 sporting rifle ===
The IOF .315 Sporting Rifle is a commercial version of the Lee-Enfield manufactured by Indian Ordnance Factories for the domestic arms market in India. It is chambered for the .315 Sporting Rifle cartridge, which is the Austro-Hungarian 8mmx50R Mannlicher cartridge loaded with a soft-point hunting bullet rather than the full metal jacket military "ball" bullet. Indian gun laws prohibit the private possession of firearms chambered for Indian (originally British) military cartridges.

=== No. 7 Jungle Carbine ===
Surplus 2A1 rifles have been modified and marketed as "No. 7 Jungle Carbines," the conversion being done for the civilian sporting arms market by Navy Arms under the Gibbs Rifle Company. Their barreled actions were made from chrome vanadium steel.

=== 2A Tanker Carbine ===
Sold in the American surplus market, these are 2A/2A1s with the barrels cut down from 25" to 20".

== Users ==
- Bangladesh: Formerly used in the Bangladesh Liberation War.
- India: Formerly used in the Indian military. Indian police forces began to phase out the rifle from 2020 and some were known to be made into anti-riot guns.

== Bibliography ==
- Skennerton, Ian (1993). The Lee–Enfield Story. Gold Coast, QLD (Australia): Arms & Militaria Press. ISBN 978-1-85367-138-8.
- Skennerton, Ian (2004). Small Arms Identification Series No. 18: 7.62mm L42A1 Sniper, L39A1, 2A & Lee–Enfield Conversions. Labrador, QLD: Arms & Militaria Press. ISBN 978-0-949749-48-2.
- Skennerton, Ian (2007). The Lee–Enfield. Gold Coast, QLD (Australia): Arms & Militaria Press. ISBN 978-0-949749-82-6.
