= No. 5 bayonet =

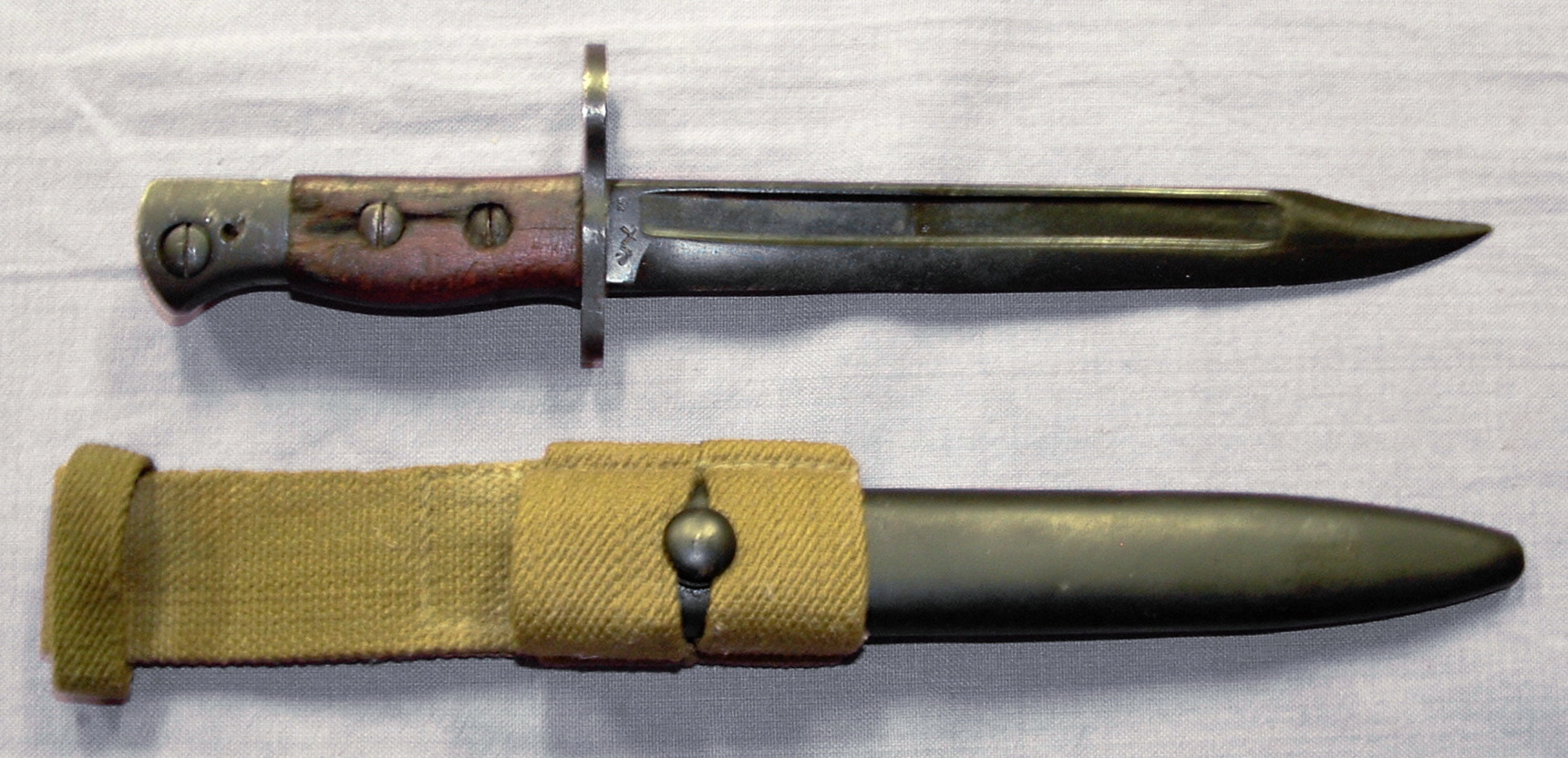
- No. 5 mk I bayonet
- Type: Bayonet
- Place of origin: United Kingdom

Service history
- Used by: United Kingdom

Specifications
- Length: 302 mm (11.9 in)
- Blade length: 200 mm (7.9 in)

The No. 5 bayonet was the bayonet used with the No. 5 Lee-Enfield which was nicknamed the "Jungle carbine". The bayonet was a blade which marked a return of the British Army to using blade type bayonets like the Pattern 1907 bayonet instead of socket bayonets such as the No. 4 bayonets used on the No. 4 Lee-Enfield.

The scabbard of the jungle carbine bayonet is also compatible with the No. 9 blade bayonet of the regular No. 4 Enfield. The No. 5 bayonet is also the bayonet for the Sterling series submachine guns.

== Production ==
There was only one variant of the No. 5 bayonet produced, which is the No. 5 Mk I bayonet. During World War II Wilkinson Sword in London produced by far the most No. 5 Mk I bayonets, producing close to 190,000. Other producers were a company called Radcliffe who made 75,000, Viners of Sheffield who made 42,000 and Elkington & Co who produced close to 10,000. Post-war manufacturing was done by the Royal Ordnance Factory in Poole. It is unknown how many they produced.
