= Phil Solomon (music executive) =

Background information
- Born: Philip Raymond Solomon; 27 April 1924; Belfast, Northern Ireland
- Died: 10 April 2011 (aged 86) Bournemouth, Dorset, England
- Occupations: Music promoter, pop manager, record producer
- Years active: fl. c. 1950s–1970
- Labels: Decca Records, Major Minor Records

Philip Raymond Solomon (27 April 1924 – 10 April 2011) was a music executive and businessman from Northern Ireland. He managed artists including The Bachelors, Them and The Dubliners, founded Major Minor Records and was co-director of Radio Caroline.

== Biography ==
=== Early career ===
Solomon was born in Belfast, Northern Ireland. He was the eldest son of a Jewish family in Belfast. Several family members had ties with the music business. His father Maurice Solomon and uncle Harold Peres founded Solomon and Peres in the early 1920s. Both Maurice and Harold Peres became two of the biggest shareholders of Decca Records. His brother Mervyn founded Emerald Music, an independent record label, specialising in Irish, Scottish and Celtic music.

Solomon started his career in the 1950s as a publicity agent for the Northern Irish singer Ruby Murray, who reached the top of the UK Singles Chart with "Softly, Softly" in 1955. Together with his wife Dorothy, whom he had married in the early 1950s, he also handled the publicity for concert tours by artists like Jimmy Shand, Jim Reeves, Acker Bilk, Chris Barber and a number of jazz and dance orchestras.

In 1958, the Solomons moved to London, where they handled the publicity for a wide range of performers, including Gene Pitney, Kenneth McKellar, Louis Armstrong and Mantovani. Solomon also started managing The Bachelors, a trio from Dublin, specialising in close-harmony versions of evergreens. The Bachelors were very successful in the mid-1960s, and scored seventeen British top fifty hits, eight of which reached the top ten between 1963 and 1967.

=== Manager ===
The Bachelors' success encouraged Solomon to start managing other artists as well. At first mostly Irish and Northern Irish artists, such as Them, and subsequently Van Morrison, The Dubliners and David McWilliams, but after a short while he also took others under his wing. One of the greatest successes by an artist from Solomon's stable was "Terry" by the English singer Twinkle, a song about a young man killed in a motorcycle accident. In the eyes of the BBC the song was an example of bad taste, and the station refused to broadcast it; in spite of this the record reached number 4 in the UK Singles Chart.

Other artists under Solomon's wing were Phil Coulter, the comedian Freddie Davies and the poet Pam Ayres.

=== Major Minor and Radio Caroline ===
In 1966, Solomon founded his own record label Major Minor Records. When the pirate station Radio Caroline ran into trouble, thanks to a heavy burden of debt, he helped clearing the debts. In exchange, he joined the board of directors. Caroline's disc jockeys were from now on obliged to play a given number of Major Minor records every day. Solomon also compelled other record companies to pay Caroline for 'plugging' their new records. These measures limited the disc jockeys' freedom to choose their own music. Some of them rebelled. Michael Pasternak, who called himself Emperor Rosko, was fired a few times by Solomon, because he refused to play Major Minor records – and re-employed by Caroline's co-director Ronan O'Rahilly.

Even Solomon could not prevent Radio Caroline's demise. Both ships that broadcast Caroline's programs were seized by creditors in March 1968. This event marked the end of his involvement with the pirate station.

Major Minor featured many Irish and Northern Irish artists, among them The Dubliners. Their "Seven Drunken Nights" was banned by the BBC in 1967 (like Twinkle's record a few years before), but reached the British Top Ten nevertheless. The label also owned the rights to the British versions of the records by Johnny Nash. Major Minor also released a few early records by the Dutch group Golden Earring.

Major Minor's two biggest hits were "Mony Mony" by Tommy James and the Shondells (number 1 in the UK in 1968) and "Je t'aime... moi non plus" by Serge Gainsbourg and Jane Birkin (1969). In the UK the BBC refused to broadcast it. Originally the record had been released by Fontana Records, but the record company's management withdrew it after it had reached number 2 in the UK Singles Chart. (Philips' president Frits Philips in the Netherlands found out it had been issued in the UK and demanded its withdrawal at once. Such was the morality of 1969 where the parent company was primarily selling radios, televisions and white goods to the public, it was felt this record was inappropriate.) Serge Gainsbourg arranged a deal with Phil Solomon, and the record was re-released on Major Minor. It then became number 1 in the UK Singles Chart the following week.

=== Later years ===
In 1970, Solomon sold Major Minor to the EMI Group. He almost completely retired from the music business. Dorothy kept on managing the Scottish singer Lena Zavaroni.

Other activities by Phil and Dorothy Solomon in later years were horse breeding, horse racing and the exploitation of art galleries in Dublin and London. In the early 1980s, Phil helped to establish a radio station in Dublin, Sunshine Radio.

Phil Solomon died of cardiac arrest on 10 April 2011 in Bournemouth, England, where he had settled. His wife Dorothy outlived him, dying on 4th January 2026, aged 92. The pair had no children.

Phil Solomon is the first cousin to Maureen Black, wife of the British born businessman and television mogul Roy Keith Black, and cousin to film producer Keith D. Black.
