= Jungle carbine =

British bolt-action rifle

Rifle No 5 Mk I "jungle carbine"
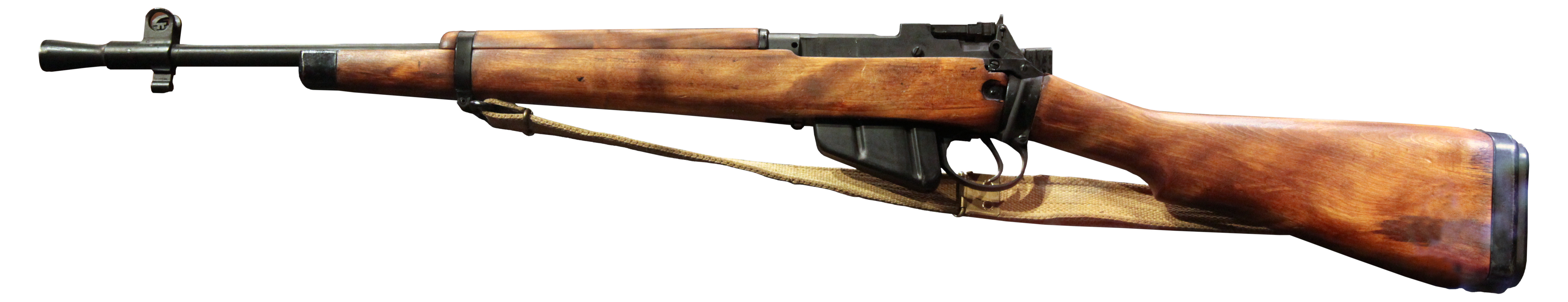
- Rifle No 5 on display at the Parachute Regiment and Airborne Forces Museum
- Type: Bolt-action carbine
- Place of origin: United Kingdom

Service history
- In service: 1944–1960 (UK)
- Used by: United Kingdom; Commonwealth of Nations; Indonesia
- Wars: World War II; Indonesian National Revolution; Korean War; Malayan Emergency; Vietnam War; Bangladesh Liberation War; Bougainville conflict

Production history
- Designer: Royal Ordnance Factory Fazakerley, Birmingham Small Arms Company
- Designed: 1944
- Produced: 1944–1947
- No. built: 251,368 total; 81,329 (BSA Shirley), 169,807 (ROF Fazakerley)

Specifications
- Mass: 7 lb 1 oz (3.20 kg), unloaded
- Length: 39.5 in (1,000 mm)
- Barrel length: 18.75 in (476 mm)
- Cartridge: .303 Mk VII SAA Ball
- Calibre: .303 British
- Action: Bolt action
- Rate of fire: 20–30 rounds/minute
- Muzzle velocity: 2,250 ft/s (690 m/s)
- Effective firing range: 500 yd (460 m)
- Maximum firing range: 200–800 yd (180–730 m) sight adjustments
- Feed system: 10-round detachable magazine (Note: although detachable, the magazine was not removed in use), loaded with 5-round charger clips
- Sights: Flip-up rear aperture sights, fixed-post front sights

The Rifle No. 5 Mk I, commonly referred to as the "jungle carbine" for its use in jungle warfare throughout Asia, was a bolt action carbine derivative of the British Lee–Enfield No. 4 Mk I. It was developed from jungle fighting experiences in the Pacific War that led the British to decide a rifle shorter and lighter than the regular Lee–Enfield was critical for better mobility. Produced between March 1944 and December 1947. It notably saw widespread usage on various sides of postwar colonial conflicts such as the Indonesian National Revolution, Malayan Emergency, and Vietnam War well into the 1960s, with sporadic use reported to have continued in several secessionist wars such as the Bangladesh Liberation War and Bougainville conflict throughout the rest of the 20th century.

== Development ==
Experience of jungle fighting in 1943 identified that mobility was critical and to that end the weight of equipment carried by the individual soldier needed to be reduced. The requirement for a rifle was a "light handy weapon with good accuracy to 400 yards [370 m]"

The first tests of the rifles took place in 1944 during which a flash hider was added. The rifle was officially introduced into service in September 1944 with 20,000 produced, and by end of 1944, 50,000 had been accepted for service.

== Design ==
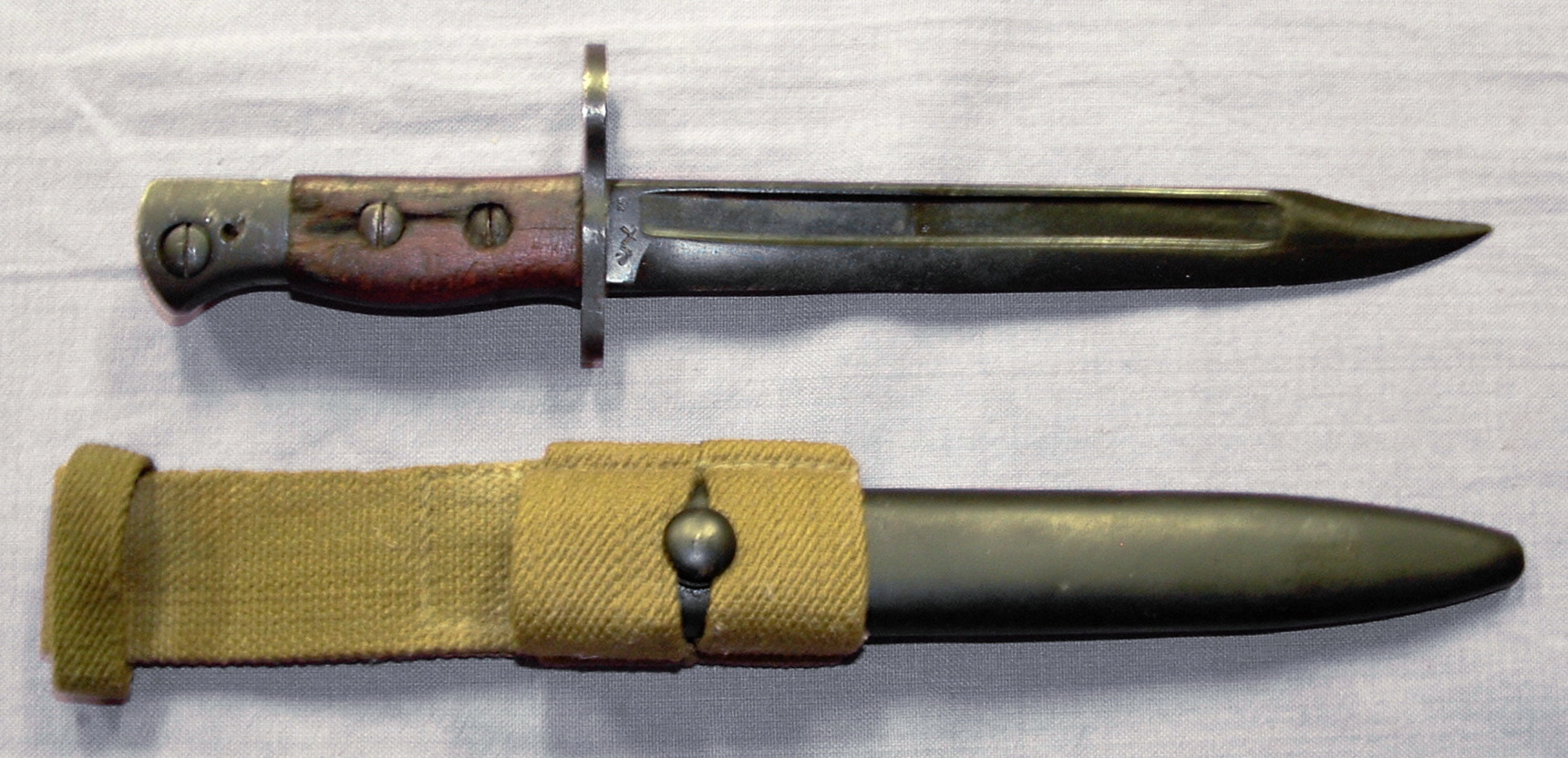
The bayonet and scabbard of a jungle carbine.

The No. 5 was about 100 mm (3.9 in) shorter and nearly a kilogram (2.2 lb) lighter than the No. 4 from which it was derived. A number of "lightening cuts" were made to the receiver body and the barrel, the bolt knob drilled out, woodwork cut down to reduce weight and had other new features like a flash suppressor and a rubber buttpad to help absorb the increased recoil and to prevent slippage on the shooter's clothing while aiming. Unlike modern recoil pads, the No. 5 buttpad significantly reduced the contact area with the user's shoulder, increasing the amount of felt recoil of the firearm. In official recoil tests, the No. 4 rifle yielded 10.06 ft⋅lbf (13.64 J) average free recoil energy and the No. 5 carbine 14.12 ft⋅lbf (19.14 J). Of the No. 5 carbine's 4.06 ft⋅lbf (5.50 J) extra recoil energy, 1.44 ft⋅lbf (1.95 J) was caused by adding the conical flash suppressor. The No. 5 iron sight line was also derived from the No. 4 and featured a rear receiver aperture battle sight calibrated for 300 yd (270 m) with an additional ladder aperture sight that could be flipped up and was calibrated for 200–800 yd (180–730 m) in 100 yd (91 m) increments. It was used in the Far East and other jungle-type environments (hence the "jungle carbine" nickname) and was popular with troops because of its light weight (compared to the SMLE and Lee–Enfield No. 4 Mk I rifles then in service) and general ease of use, although there were some concerns from troops about the increased recoil due to the lighter weight.

Due to the large conical flash suppressor, the No 5 Mk I could only mount the No. 5 blade bayonet, which was also designed to serve as a combat knife if needed. The scabbard of the jungle carbine bayonet is also compatible with the No. 9 bayonet of the regular No. 4 Enfield. The No. 5 bayonet is cross compatible with the Sterling SMG.

Several No. 5 Mk 2 versions of the rifle were proposed, including changes such as strengthening the action to enable grenade-firing, and mounting the trigger from the receiver instead of on the trigger guard, but none of these would proceed towards production, let alone adoption into service. Similarly, a number of "takedown" models of No. 5 Mk I rifle intended for Airborne use were also trialed, but were not put into production.

=== "Wandering zero" ===
One of the complaints leveled against the No. 5 Mk I rifle by soldiers was that it had a "wandering zero" – i.e., the rifle could not be "sighted in" and then relied upon to shoot to the same point of impact later on. This condition is accurately referred to as an inability to zero.

Tests conducted during the mid to late 1940s appeared to confirm that the rifle did have some accuracy issues, likely relating to the lightening cuts made in the receiver, combined with the presence of a flash suppressor on the end of the barrel. The British government officially declared the jungle carbine possessed faults "inherent in the design" and discontinued production at the end of 1947.

However, modern collectors and shooters have pointed out that no jungle carbine collector/shooter on any of the prominent internet military firearm collecting forums has reported a confirmed "wandering zero" on their No. 5 Mk I rifle, leading to speculation that the No. 5 Mk I may have been phased out largely because the British military did not want a bolt-action rifle when most of the other major militaries were switching over to semiautomatic rifles such as the M1 Garand, SKS, FN Model 1949 and MAS-49.

Nonetheless, it has also been pointed out by historians and collectors that the No. 5 Mk I must have had some fault not found with the No. 4 Lee–Enfield (from which the jungle carbine was derived), as the British military continued with manufacture and issue of the Lee–Enfield No. 4 Mk 2 rifle until 1957, before finally converting to the L1A1 SLR.

== Operational history ==
The rifle was first issued to British airborne forces in Norway towards the end of the Second World War; these were troops that were likely to be sent to the Far East for an invasion of Japan. The term was colloquial and never applied by the British Armed Forces, but the Rifle No. 5 Mk I was informally referred to as a "jungle carbine" by British and Commonwealth troops during the Malayan Emergency.

== Postwar non-military conversions ==
Though they did not invent the name, the designation "jungle carbine" was used by the Golden State Arms Corporation in the 1950s and 1960s to market sporterised military surplus Lee–Enfield rifles under the "Santa Fe" brand. Golden State Arms Co. imported huge numbers of SMLE Mk III* and Lee–Enfield No. 4 rifles and converted them to civilian versions of the No. 5 Mk I and general sporting rifles for the hunting and recreational shooting markets in the US, marketing them as "Santa Fe Jungle Carbine" rifles and "Santa Fe Mountaineer" rifles, among other names.

This has led to a lot of confusion regarding the identification of actual No. 5 Mk I "jungle carbine" rifles, as opposed to the post-war civilian sporting rifles marketed under the same name. The easiest way to identify a "jungle carbine" rifle is to look for the markings on the left hand side of the receiver; a genuine No. 5 will have "Rifle No 5 Mk I" as well as either a BSA or F (Fazakerly) marking electrostencilled there, while a post-war conversion will generally have either no markings or markings from manufacturers who did not make the No. 5 Mk I (for example, Savage or Long Branch). Santa Fe "Jungle Carbine" rifles are so marked on the barrel.

Companies such as the Gibbs Rifle Company and Navy Arms in the U.S. have produced and sold completely re-built Enfields of all descriptions, most notably their recent "#7 Jungle Carbine" (made from Ishapore 2A1 rifles) and the "Bulldog" or "Tanker" carbine rifles, which are also fashioned original SMLE and No. 4 rifles.
