= Glenn Miller Medley =

Single by John Anderson Big Band
- Genre: Jazz; Pop music
- Label: Modern Records

The "Glenn Miller Medley" (also called "Plays Glenn Miller") was a single by the John Anderson Big Band. It was a medley, covering several songs previously recorded by jazz musician Glenn Miller, including "In the Mood", "American Patrol", "Little Brown Jug" and "Pennsylvania 6-5000". It first entered the UK Singles Chart on 21 December 1985, and reached a peak position of number 63, and remained in the chart for 2 weeks. It re-entered the chart on 11 January 1986, remaining there for 3 more weeks, and reaching number 61. It was later sampled by Jive Bunny and the Mastermixers.
