= John Anderson (producer) =

Northern Irish composer, editor and arranger (1948–2024)

- Born: John Edgar Thomas Anderson; 18 May 1948; Belfast, Northern Ireland
- Died: 23 March 2024 (aged 75)
- Occupations: Composer, record producer
- Instruments: Piano, Keyboards
- Years active: 1979–2024
- Labels: Emerald, MCA

John Edgar Thomas Anderson (18 May 1948 – 23 March 2024) was a Northern Irish composer, editor, arranger, television producer and director, record producer and radio presenter. He was "one of Ireland’s most accomplished writers, producers, directors and composers".

== Early life ==
Anderson was born in Belfast in Northern Ireland on 18 May 1948. As a young child he grew up on the Rathcoole estate on the outskirts of Belfast, and attended Whitehouse Primary School, where he would learn the piano and sing in the choir.

He would later attend the Royal Belfast Academical Institution where he studied Music, English, French and Spanish at A-Level in 1966. He then was admitted to the Queen’s University of Belfast, and went on to be elected the President of the Music Society. He later graduated as a Bachelor of Music (with Honours) in 1969.

In 1971, he was appointed to be Assistant Director of Music at Methodist College Belfast. A post he would hold for the next seven years. It was during this time he was the organist for St. Comgall’s Parish Church, Rathcoole, and later as conductor for the Harlandic Male Voice Choir.

== Career ==
Anderson worked as a Producer and TV Studio Director for UTV and BBC NI.

=== John Anderson Big Band ===
Anderson is known for the John Anderson Big Band, which had chart hits with the Glenn Miller Medley and In the Mood. He is also known for producing the basis for the Jive Bunny hits.

His Glenn Miller Medley entered the UK Singles Charts in 1985 and reached number 61 and stayed there for 5 weeks

Anderson was later signed as a solo recording artist to MCA (Universal) and entered the UK Album Charts on 25 November 1995, with the album The Romance of Ireland.

=== Radio ===
Anderson produced and presented a long-running, one-hour weekly radio show on BBC Radio Ulster. From 2007-2018 Anderson produced and presented a weekly series for BBC Radio Ulster, called "Sing Out".

== On Eagle’s Wing ==
Anderson is perhaps best known as the writer and producer of the musical stage show On Eagle’s Wing, a musical about the Ulster-Scots and their impact on the history of Scotland, Northern Ireland and the United States. It was debuted in Belfast at the SSE Odyssey Arena in May 2004.

Former US President Jimmy Carter stated that the show was sure to promote the parity of esteem initiated by the Good Friday Agreement, "On Eagle’s Wing will facilitate a better appreciation of the story of the Scots-Irish…it supports efforts towards reconciliation, peace and acceptance of cultural differences".

It has been broadcast across the USA from coast to coast on PBS in 2005., and was also broadcast to Australia. It has been distributed on DVD by Foreign Media Music (Netherlands). A documentary was also made, by Moore Sinnerton.

== Death ==
Anderson died after a short illness at home, on 23 March 2024, at the age of 75.
