= Sten bayonet mk I =

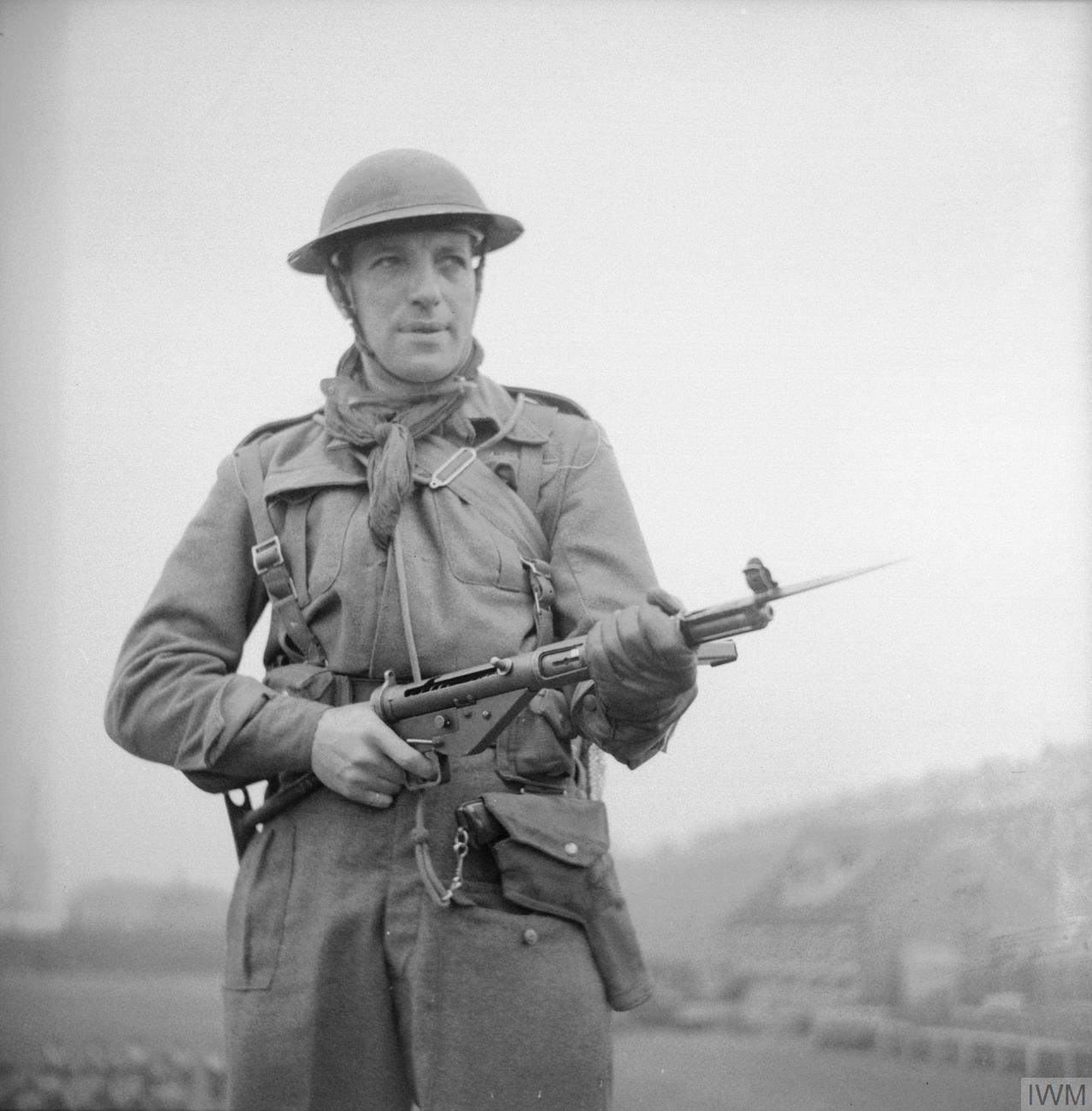
- British soldier holding Sten gun Mk II with attached bayonet 3 August 1942
- Type: Spike bayonet

Service history
- Used by: United Kingdom
- Wars: World War II

Specifications
- Length: 305 mm (12.0 in)
- Blade length: 203 mm (8.0 in)

The Sten bayonet Mark I was the standard bayonet for the Sten mk II submachine gun. Most of the bayonets were disposed of making originals extremely rare.

== Design ==
The Sten bayonet mk I was a socket bayonet just like the No. 4 Bayonet. The blade was copied from the No 4 mk II* bayonet meaning the bayonet is just a metal spike with no milling. The bayonet itself was made of sheet steel and was the most simplistic British bayonet of World War II. The bayonet could be detached for use as a hand-to-hand combat weapon.

== Production ==
As the Sten bayonet mk I was a copy of the No 4 mk II* bayonet the blade and socket were made by separate manufacturers. The blades or really just spikes were made by B. & J. Sippel who usually made stamped cutlery and Laspee Engineering in Isleworth. The sockets were made and then joined with the spikes to make the bayonet by Grundy who made metal products and N.J. Edmonds who made combined around 90,000 bayonets the majority being made by Grundy.
