= Solomon and Peres =

Irish music and entertainment house

- Company type: Music Production and Distribution
- Industry: Retail
- Founded: 1924
- Headquarters: Belfast, Northern Ireland
- Products: Records, Posters

Solomon and Peres was a music and entertainment retailer, distributor and music production house based in Belfast, Northern Ireland and Ireland from 1924 to 1981, before becoming acquired by Decca Records. It was owned and operated by brothers-in-law Harold Peres and Maurice Solomon who ran the business until Harold's death in 1967. It is most notable for discovering Van Morrison.

== History ==
The name Solomon and Peres dates back to the courtship of both its founders. Harold Peres married Millie Solomon in June 1923. His sister, Evelyn married Millie's older brother, Maurice that following year. From 1924 to 1967, both families lived at 686 Antrim Road and 688 Antrim Road, respectively.

Maurice Solomon and Harold Peres who founded the company as a wireless shop in Winetavern Street in Belfast in the 1920s. Both were Russian Jews who arrived penniless in Northern Ireland. Maurice Solomon sold cups of water on the beach in Millisle in summer and peddled haberdashery in the winter until he met Harold Peres who was interested in the new fangled "wireless business". Together they took an agency for the Decca Records and over the years build up a substantial shareholding.

After the death of Harold Peres in 1967, Maurice'a sons, Mervyn and Philip took control of the family business. Harold's only child, Maureen, wife of British Businessman, Roy Keith Black was given no control of the family business nor its heavy fortune. She was shut out of the family business for an undisclosed amount.

=== Acquisition by Decca Records ===
In May 1981, Decca Records, announced the purchase of Solomon and Peres for $21 Million.
