= List of British naval forces military equipment of World War II =

This is a list of the military equipment of the Royal Navy and other British naval forces of World War II. This list shows the equipment for British naval and naval aviation forces like naval artillery on board British ships and boats as well as the weapons used by British naval forces such as torpedoes and naval mines.

== Naval artillery ==
=== Battleship and monitor main armament ===
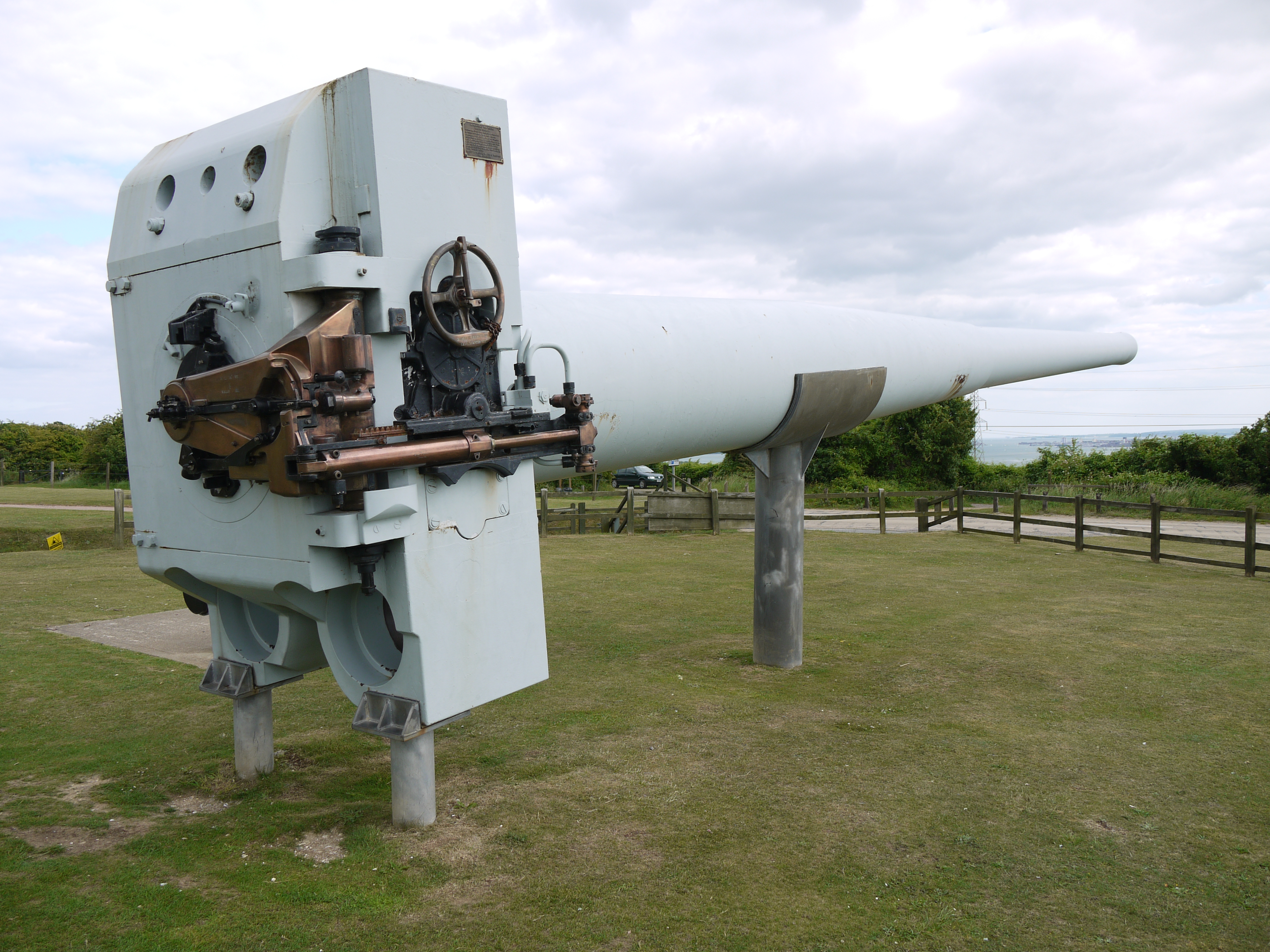
The BL 14-inch Mark VII (preserved example at Fort Nelson, Hampshire) were only used on the five King George V-class battleships

- BL 14-inch Mk VII
- BL 15-inch Mk I
- BL 16-inch Mk I

=== Heavy cruiser main armament ===
- BL 7.5-inch Mk VI
- BL 8-inch Mk VIII

=== Light cruiser main armament and battleship and heavy cruiser secondary armament ===
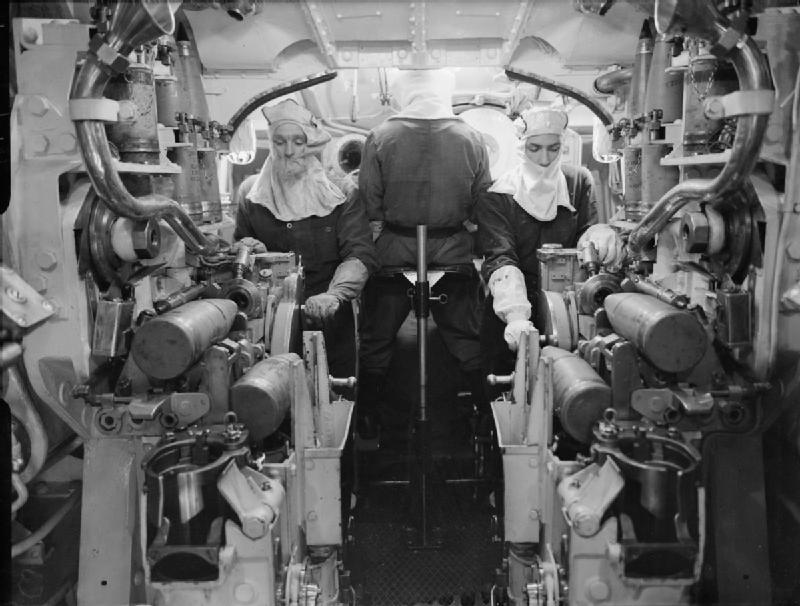
Inside a QF 5.25-inch gun turret on the battleship HMS King George V.

- QF 4-inch Mk V
- QF 5.25-inch Mk I dual-purpose gun, used on King George V-class battleships and Dido-class cruisers
- BL 6-inch Mk XII
- BL 6-inch Mk XXII
- BL 6-inch Mk XXIII

=== Small ship main armament ===
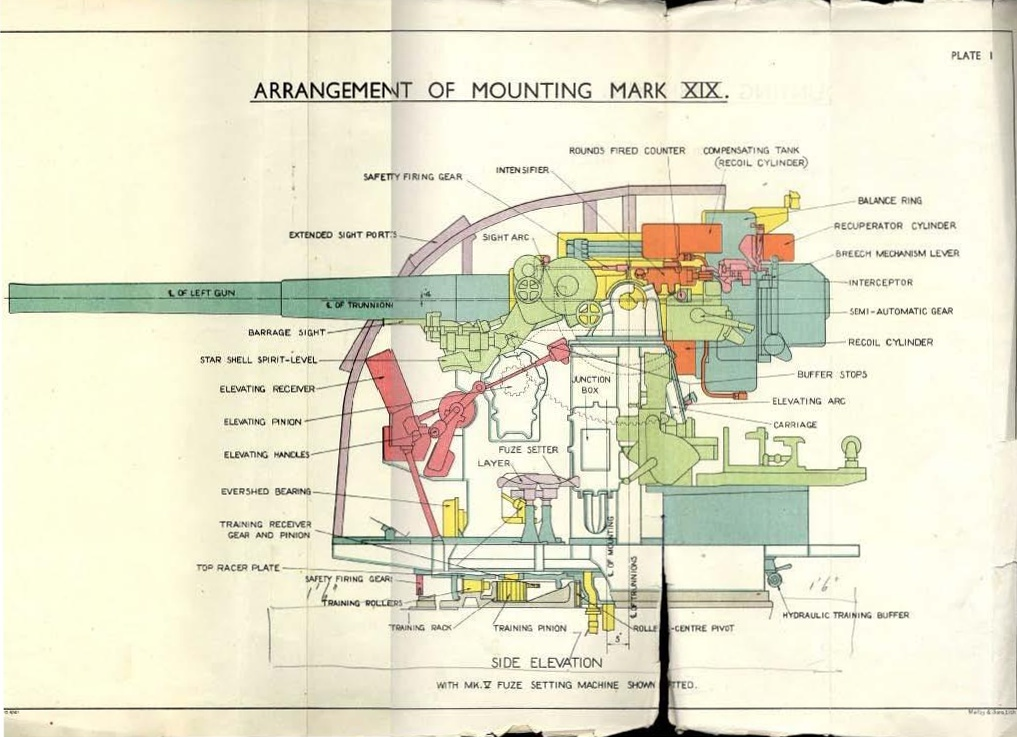
Diagram of QF 4 inch mk XVI gun on mk XIX mounting.

British made

- QF 6-pounder 10 cwt
- QF 12-pounder 12 cwt
- QF 4 inch Mk IV
- BL 4-inch Mk IX
- QF 4-inch Mk XVI
- QF 4-inch Mk XIX
- QF 4.5-inch Mk I – V
- BL 4.7-inch Mk I and Mk II
- QF 4.7-inch Mk IX & XII naval gun
- QF 4.7-inch Mk XI naval gun

US naval artillery obtained by Lend-Lease and destroyers for bases agreement

- 3-inch/50-calibre gun
- 4-inch/50-calibre gun

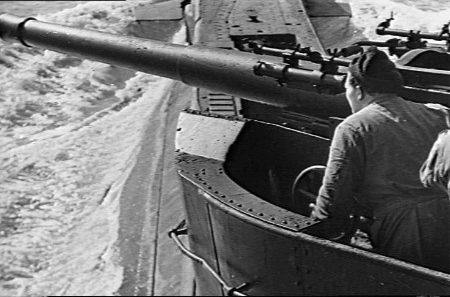
QF 4 inch Mk XII gun on a T-class submarine

=== Submarine armament ===
- QF 4-inch naval gun Mk XII and Mk XXII

=== Armed boats armament ===
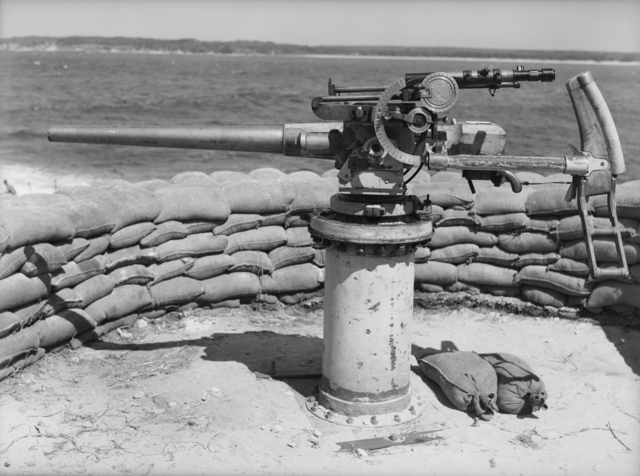
QF 3 pounder Hotchkiss gun in Sydney in 1942

- QF 3-pounder Hotchkiss
- QF 6-pdr Class M Mark I with Auto Loader Mk III

== Aircraft ==
- List of Fleet Air Arm aircraft in World War II

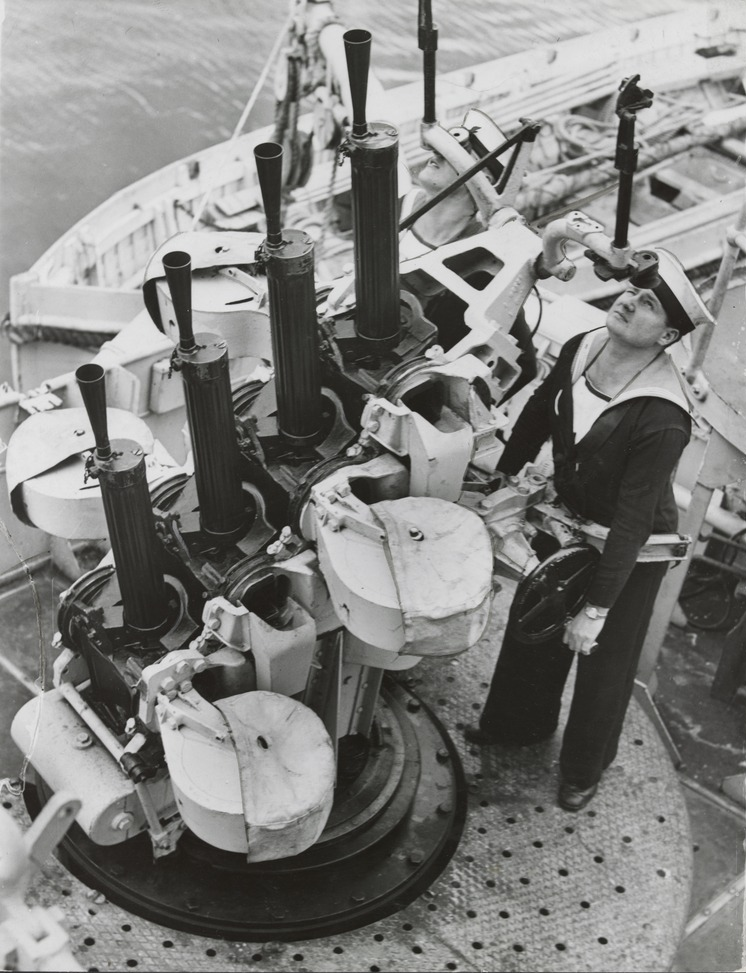
.50 inch Vickers machine guns in quadruple mount aboard HMAS Perth.

== Anti-aircraft guns ==
=== Machine guns ===
- Lewis gun
- Vickers .50 machine gun

=== Autocannons ===
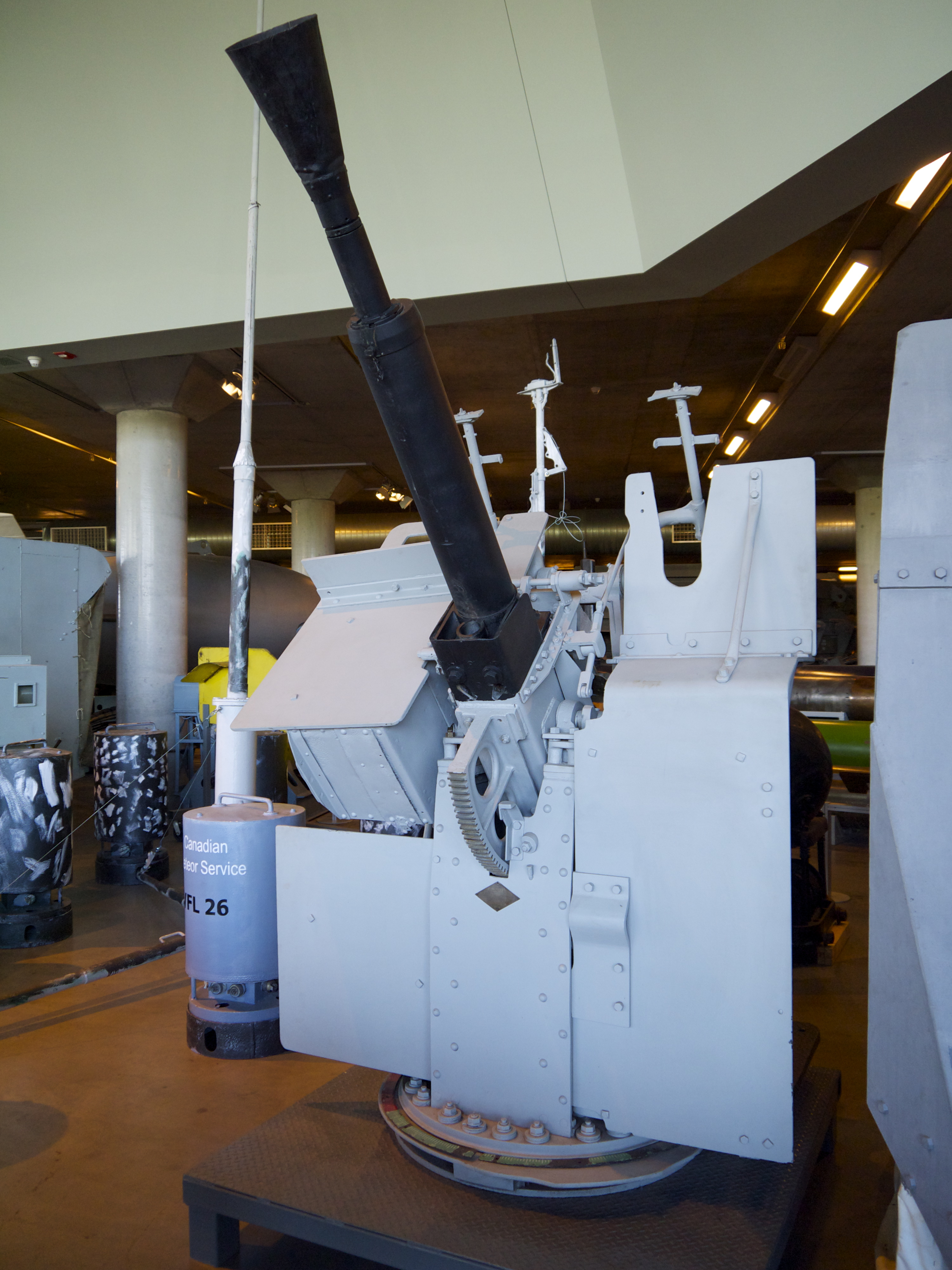
Single barrel QF 2 pounder Mk VIII from HMCS Kamloops

- QF 2-pounder Mk I and Mk VIII
- Oerlikon 20 mm cannon - licensed production of Swiss design
- Bofors 40 mm gun license production of Swedish design

=== Anti-aircraft artillery ===
British made

- QF 3-inch 20 cwt
- QF 4.7-inch Mk VIII naval gun

US made obtained through Destroyers-for-bases deal

- 3-inch/23-calibre

=== Other ===
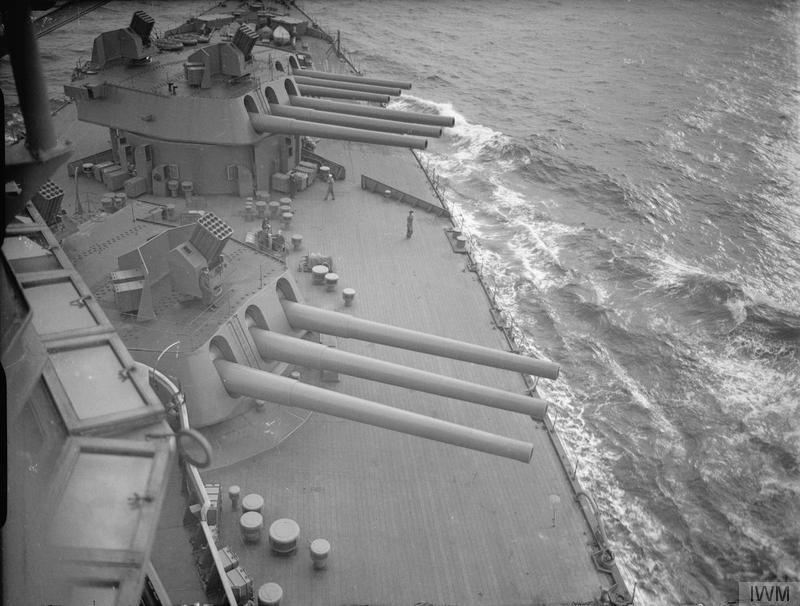
Unrotated Projectile launchers on top of the 16-inch gun turrets of HMS Nelson

- Holman Projector
- Unrotated Projectile

== Torpedoes ==
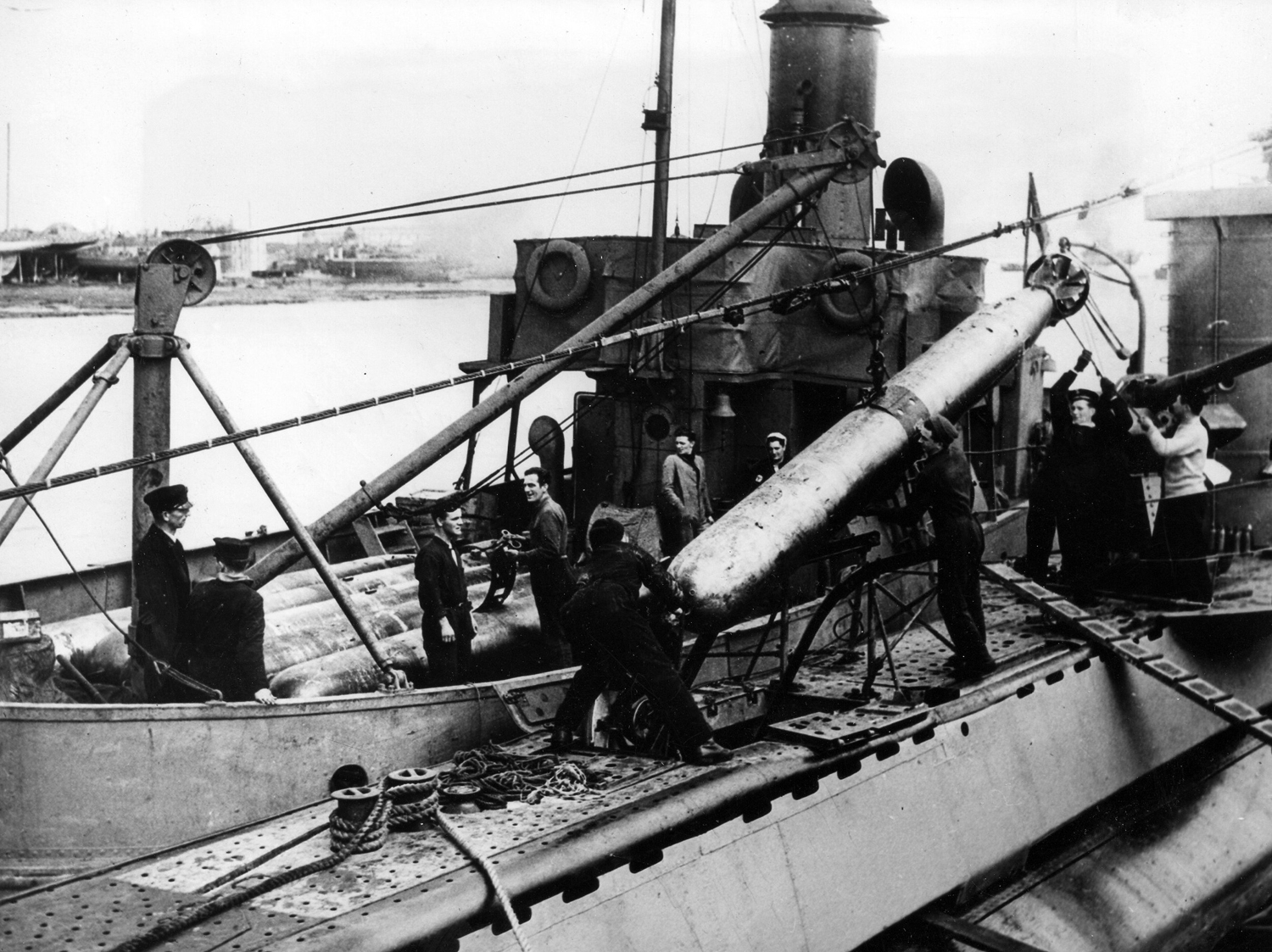
British 21 inch Mk VIII Torpedo being loaded onto the Polish submarine ORP Sokół (1940)

- 18-inch torpedoes Mk VIII-XVII
- 21-inch torpedo Mk II-XI
- 24.5-inch torpedo - fitted to Nelson-class battleships only

== Naval mines ==
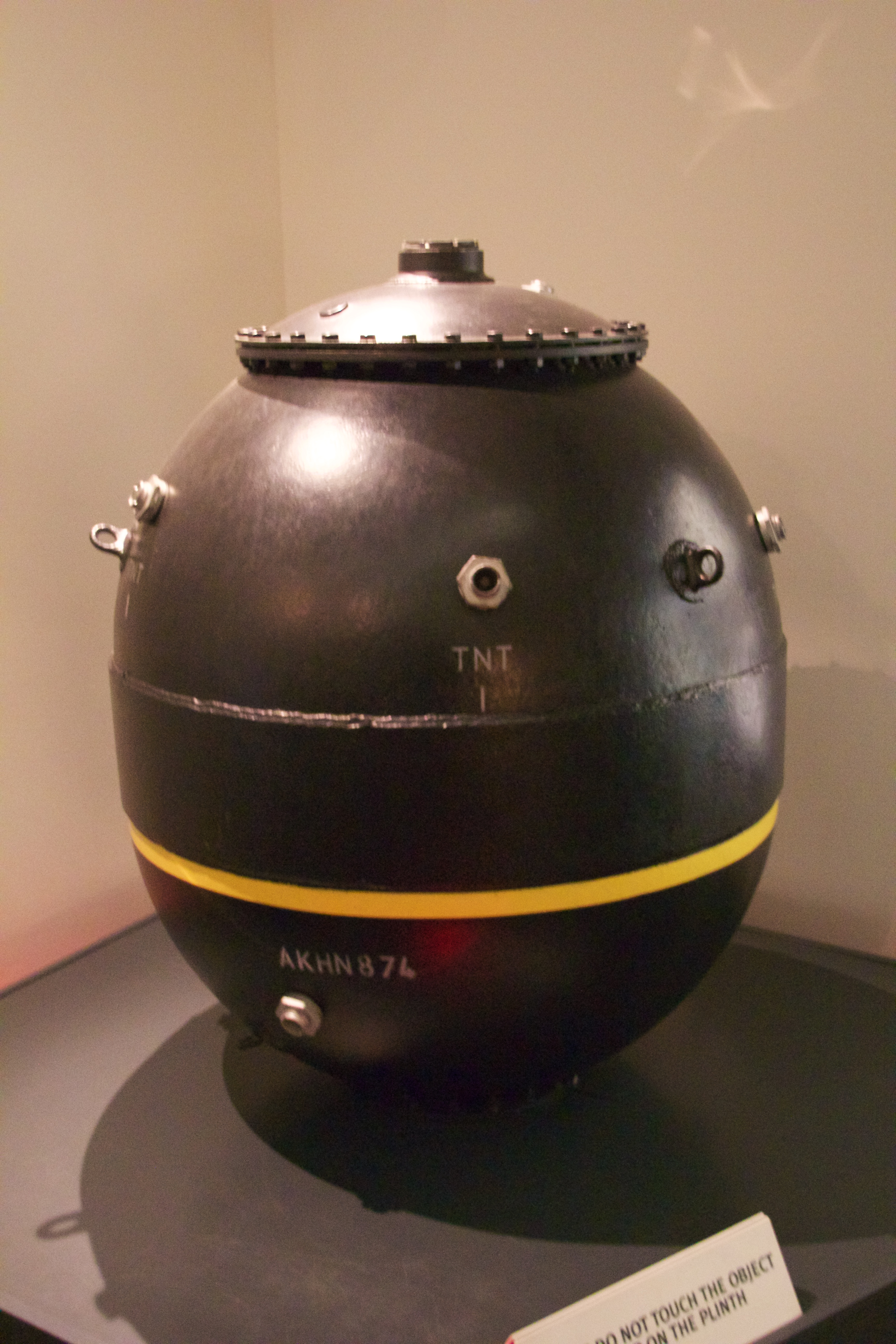
Deactivated(no switch horn triggers) mark XVII contact naval mine which was the standard British contact naval mine of World War II.

- Mark XVII contact naval mine

== Anti-submarine weapons ==
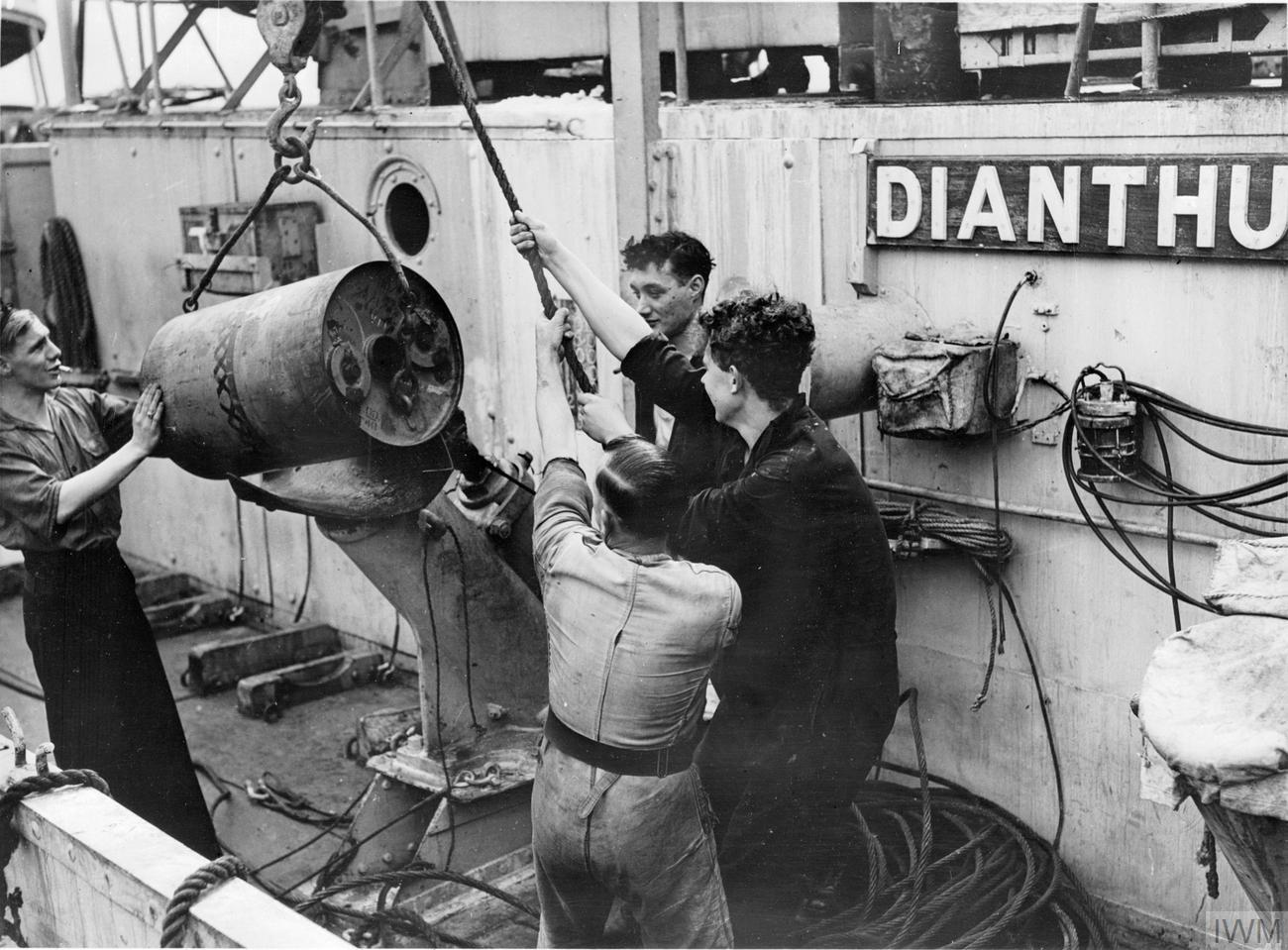
A Mk VII depth charge being loaded onto a Mk IV depth charge thrower onboard the Flower-class corvette HMS Dianthus.

=== Depth charges ===
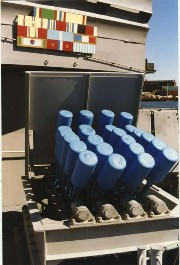
Hedgehog anti-submarine spigot mortar launcher with practice projectiles

- Mark VII depth charge
- Mark VII Heavy
- Mark VII Airborne DC
- Mark VIII Airborne DC
- Mark X, X*
- Mark XI Airborne DC

=== Anti-submarine projectile launchers ===
- Hedgehog - multiple spigot mortar
- Squid - three barrelled 12-inch anti-submarine mortar

== Naval radar ==
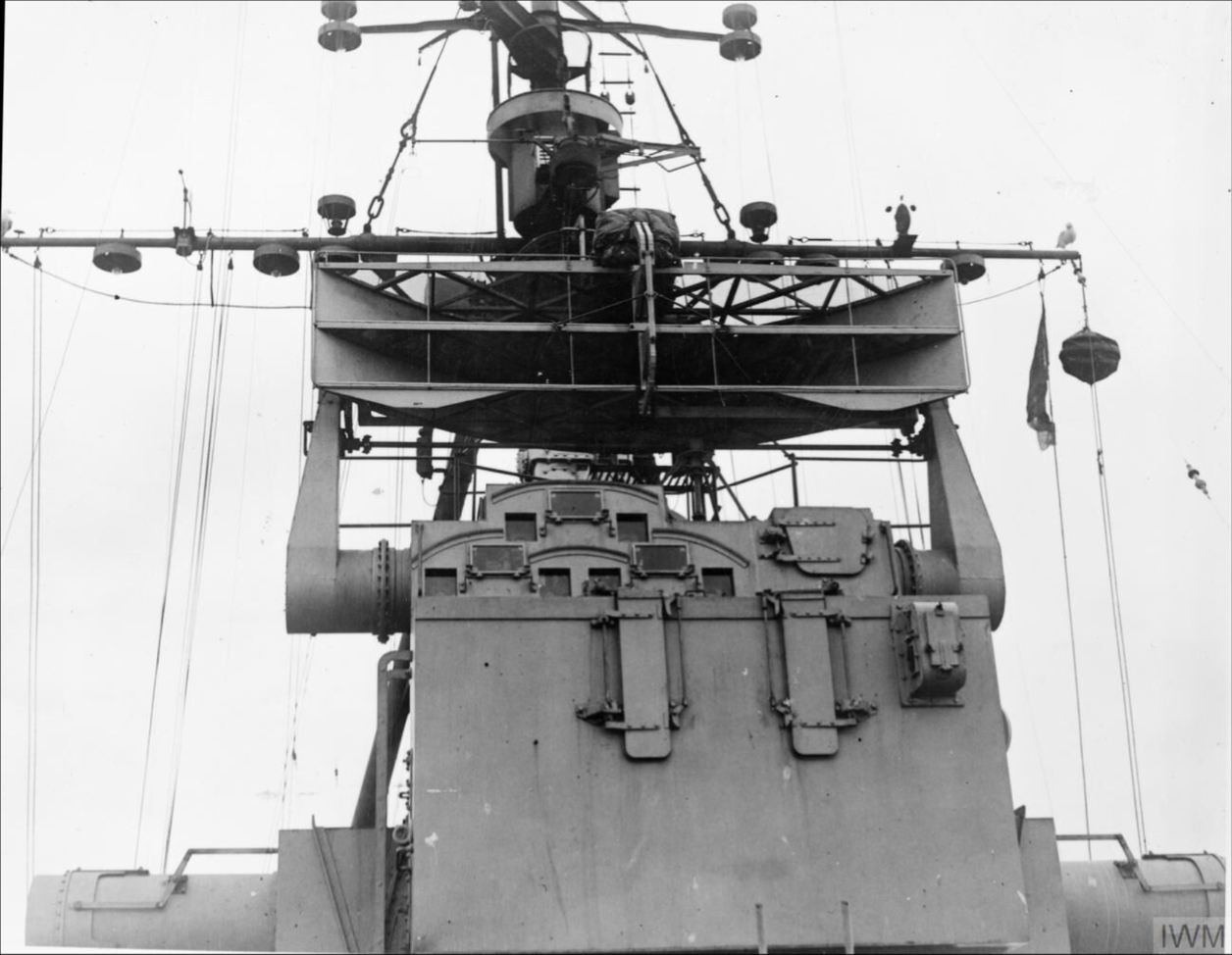
Main Armament Fire Control Radar Set equipped with a Type 274 aerial onboard the light cruiser HMS Swiftsure

See List of World War II British naval radar

== Boilers ==
- Admiralty 3-drum boiler

== Small arms ==
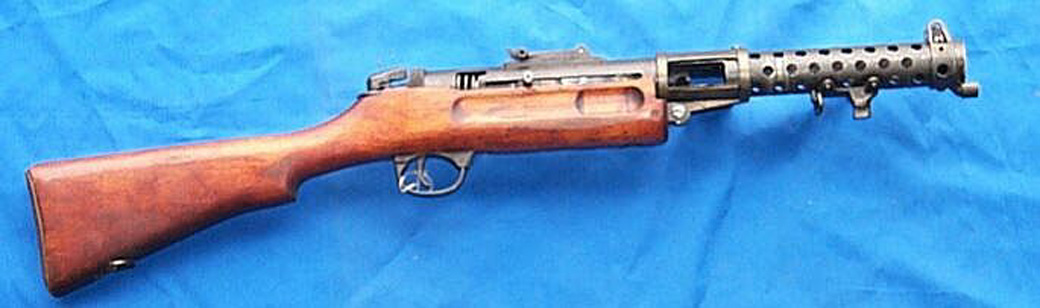
The Lanchester submachine gun was used by the Royal Navy and, to a lesser extent, the Royal Air Force.

- Lanchester submachine gun - 9mm Parabellum
