= List of equipment of RAF Bomber Command aircraft of World War II =

This is a list of equipment of RAF Bomber Command aircraft used during World War II.This list includes gun turrets, bomb sights and radios used in RAF bombers.

== Electronic countermeasures ==
- Window

== Gun turrets ==
- Nash & Thompson gun turrets

=== Machine Guns ===
- 0.303-inch Browning machine gun
- 0.030-inch Vickers K machine gun

== Bomb sights ==
- Course Setting Bomb Sight
- Mark XIV bomb sight

== Radars ==
- H2S (radar)

== Radios ==
- R1155

== Free fall bombs ==
- Blockbuster bomb
- Bouncing bomb
- Grand Slam (bomb)
- Tallboy bomb
