= Video Library (company) =

- Type: Publicly traded company
- Industry: Video rental
- Founded: 1979
- Founder: Barry L. Rosenblatt
- Defunct: 1989
- Fate: Acquired by Blockbuster Video
- Headquarters: San Diego, California
- Key people: Barry L. Rosenblatt (Founder and CEO)
- Products: Video rental services
- Revenue: $11.9 million (Q3 1987)
- Parent: Blockbuster Video

Video Library was a publicly traded video rental shop based in San Diego, California. It operated 43 corporate stores from 1979 until 1989, when they were acquired and converted into Blockbuster Video.

== History ==
Video Library conducted its initial public stock offering in mid-1985.

Video Library was owned by Founder and President and Chief Executive Barry L. Rosenblatt, Chairman Roy Keith Black, and shareholder Pauline Sussman. As part of the acquisition deal, the three executives received Blockbuster stock valued at $66.4 million. At the time of the acquisition, Blockbuster Video operated 58 company-owned and franchised Blockbuster Video Superstores.

Video Library reported $11.9 million (~$28.1 million in 2024) in revenue for the third quarter of Sept. 1987.

On Friday, December 23, 1988, Blockbuster without warning abruptly terminated almost all of the Video Library main office staff.
