= No. 4 bayonet =

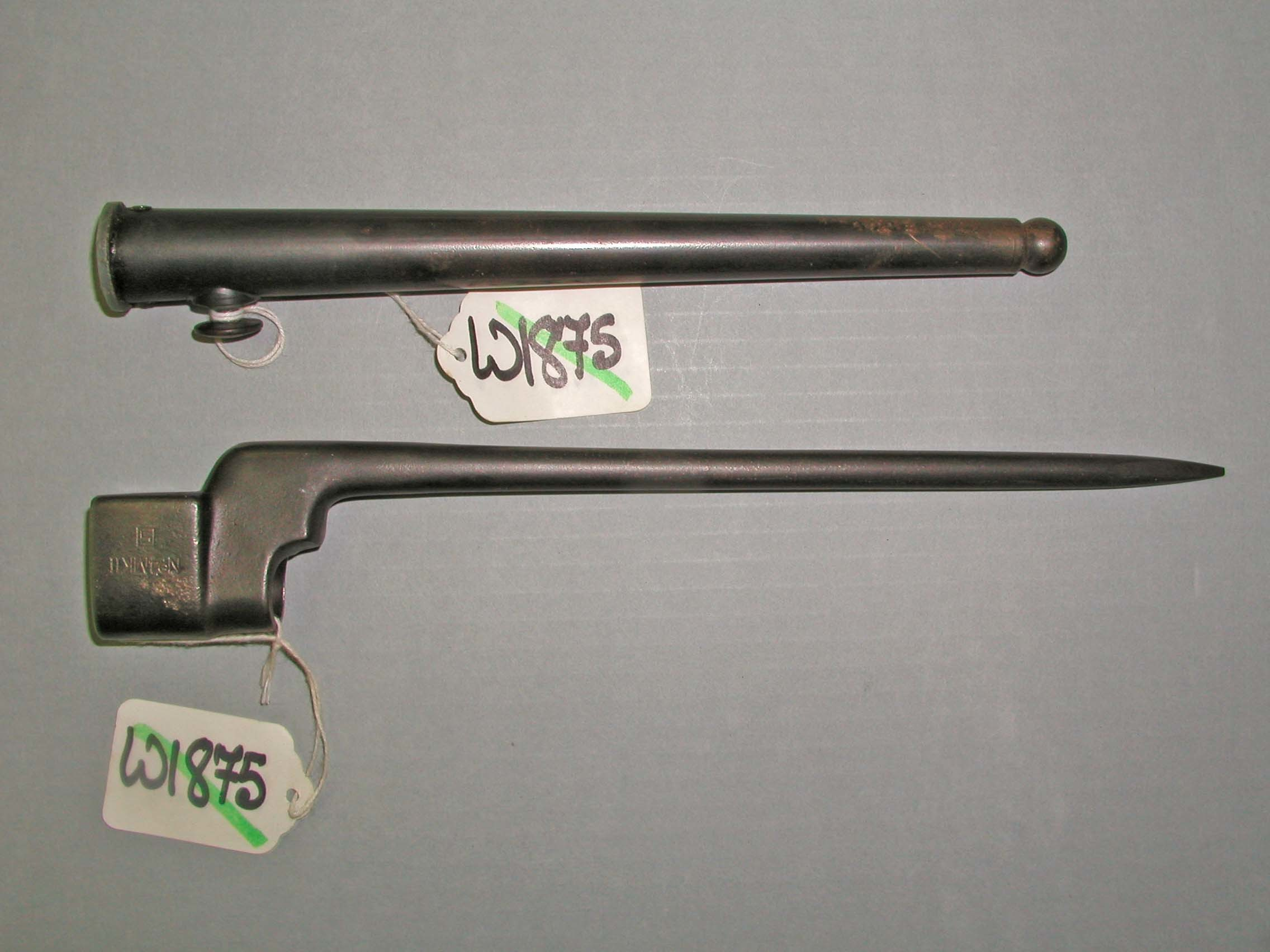
- A No. 4 mk II bayonet with its scabbard.
- Place of origin: United Kingdom

Service history
- In service: 1941–1954
- Used by: United Kingdom
- Wars: World War II

Production history
- Variants: No 4 mk I, II, II* and III

Specifications
- Length: 10 in (250 mm)
- Blade length: 8 in (200 mm)

The No. 4 bayonet was the standard bayonet for all Lee Enfield No. 4 rifles.

== Development ==
=== Origins ===
The No. 4 bayonet was developed following two decades of British Army studies and trials after the First World War aimed at replacing the Pattern 1907 bayonet. During this period, several experimental designs were evaluated, including folding bayonets and knife-type patterns. Many of the experimental models used a cruciform spike blade.

Development of the Lee–Enfield No. 4 rifle required a new bayonet mounting system, leading to the adoption of a socket-mounted Spike_bayonet. The design was shorter, lighter, and significantly simpler to manufacture than earlier British bayonets.

The No. 4 Mk I bayonet was approved on the 15th November 1939 alongside the No. 4 Mk I rifle. Its simplified construction allowed production to be carried out by a wide range of civilian manufacturers.

=== Wartime evolution ===
During the course of World War II the design of the No. 4 bayonet changed over time. The first variant, the No. 4 mk I bayonet, much like other weapons at the beginning of World War II, was high quality. Hence relatively few of this variant of the No. 4 bayonet were produced. The next variant made in 1942 and the most produced one is the No. 4 mk II bayonet which saved production time by omitting milling the blade in the production process but had no other design changes. After the No. 4 mk II bayonet the design was further changed in 1942 to save costs and disperse production by making the blade and socket separately and this became the bayonet No. 4 mk II*. The final variant of the No. 4 bayonet is the bayonet No. 4 mk III which further reduced the cost of a bayonet by making the socket out of welding stamped steel pieces instead of as a single piece.

== Production ==
In total roughly around 5 million No. 4 bayonets of all marks were produced during World War II. As the No. 4 bayonet was simple to make and there was no spare production capacity in UK government weapons factories local production in the UK was contracted to private companies that did not usually produce weapons. The first No. 4 bayonet manufacturer was a branch of the Singer Manufacturing Company in Clydebank near Glasgow in Scotland. Singer normally made sewing machines. Singer was the first company contracted to make No. 4 bayonets and produced the No. 4 mk I and No. 4 mk II bayonets. The No. 4 mk I bayonet was exclusively produced by Singer in relatively small quantities, they produced only 75,000 of them. The other manufacturers of the No. 4 mk II bayonet were based abroad being The Crown corporation Small Arms Limited based in Long Branch in Toronto, Canada and Savage Arms out of their facility in Chicopee, Massachusetts in the United States. The Crown corporation Small Arms Limited was a Canadian government weapons manufacturer and Savage Arms who also produced Lee Enfield No. 4 mk I rifles produced the No. 4 mk II bayonet to provide to the UK under Lend-Lease. Overall the three manufacturers produced roughly one million bayonets each leading to a rough total of around 3 million No. 4 mk II bayonets being produced which is over half of No. 4 bayonet production. The production of the No. 4 mk II* and No. 4 mk III bayonets were all done in the UK. The No. 4 mk II* was produced by four companies of which three were in England which were Prince-Smith & Stells in Keighley, Yorkshire, Howard & Bullough in Accrington, Lancashire, Lewisham Engineering in Ladywell, London and one in Northern Ireland, Baird Manufacturing from Belfast. Normally Prince-Smith & Stells and Howard & Bullough manufactured industrial machinery and Lewisham engineering was solely founded to make the bayonets. Baird manufacturing before the war did engineering. Roughly 1300000 No 4 mk II* bayonets were produced the majority by Smith & Stells who made a million and the other manufacturers roughly made a 100,000 each. The No. 4 mk III bayonet was produced in relatively small quantities by one manufacturer, Joseph Lucas Limited in Chester Street, Birmingham. They made roughly 200,000. Joseph Lucas made automotive components before the war.
