= Emerald Music =

Northern Irish record label

- Founded: 1964
- Founder: Mervyn Solomon
- Genre: Irish, Scottish, Celtic
- Country of origin: Northern Ireland
- Location: Roughfort
- Official website: www.emeraldmusiconline.com

Emerald Music is an independent record label that specializes in Irish, Scottish, and Celtic music. It is based in Roughfort, County Antrim, Northern Ireland.

== Background ==
Emerald Music was founded in 1964 by Mervyn Solomon, the first person to record Rory Gallagher and Van Morrison of the group Them. The label specialises in Irish traditional music and compilation albums. It also covers Scottish music, including pipe bands. The company has an extensive back catalogue and claims to be one of the most comprehensive Irish and Scottish record labels.

George Doherty started working with Mervyn Solomon in Emerald's Hydepark Studios in September 1975. Doherty and Solomon had two UK Top Twenty albums with Scottish singer Ann Williamson. During 1989 Doherty teamed up with John Anderson and produced what proved to be the backbone for the first four Jive Bunny hits. The Jive Bunny album was number 1 in the UK and went triple platinum with over 900,000 sales. Jive Bunny was also a top ten hit in many countries around the world including the US.

Doherty and Anderson then bought the studios and label from Mervyn Solomon in 1992. In 2000 Anderson left to pursue his dream of writing a musical for stage. Doherty ran the business with Martin McBurney until September 2012, when Doherty bought McBurney's interest in Emerald and become sole owner of the company.

== Artists ==
Artists on Emerald have included Jim Armstrong and John Wilson, who both played with Them, and the John Anderson Big Band, who played on the Jive Bunny hit records. The catalogue includes 1980s Irish rock band Bagatelle, 1950s singer Bridie Gallagher, Scottish singers Andy Stewart, Sydney Devine, techno duo Celtic Pride, Irish folk groups Cu Chulainn and Usnagh, singer Malachi Cush, Ulster comedy group Clubsound, and dance DJ Micky Modelle.

== See also ==
- List of record labels
