= Viners =

Cutlery and kitchenware company

Viners is a United Kingdom brand of cutlery, kitchenware and dinnerware products, founded in 1901 in Sheffield, England by Adolphe Viener and his sons. By the 1960s, it had expanded to subsidiaries in Ireland, Australia and France. In mid-2000, Oneida, of the United States, paid $25 million in cash for Viners which was put into administration on 30 October 2014. Merseyside-based Rayware, a privately owned housewares group, bought Viners out of administration for £1.6 million in November 2014 and in 2015 set about "reinvigorating the brand".

== History ==
The company, which as Viners Ltd., grew to be the biggest cutlery manufacturer in England after World War II, was started around 1901 by Adolphe Viener (also spelled Adolph Weiner when he was knighted by the Crown) and his sons. They were silversmiths who initially worked in traditional small workshops. The hallmark for Viners Ltd. silver was registered to son Edward Viner: in 1932 it was "E.V" with figures and in 1964, it was "EV" with associated figures.

=== Growth ===
One of the sons, Ruben Viner, became the driving force in the 20th century to expand the company. It manufactured stainless steel cutlery and other products. The firm prospered in the 1960s with a modern factory in Sheffield and subsidiaries in Ireland, France and Australia. From 1945, the cutlery industry in Sheffield began a slow decline, accelerated with the collapse of steel and other heavy industries.

But, beginning in the mid-1970s, East Asian imports began to flood into the UK. The company started importing cutlery to finish and stamp "Made in Sheffield." Loans for expansion were crippling the firm and they went bust in 1985. Ruben Viner had retired from the firm in 1980.

== Products ==
- Cutlery
- Flatware
- Silverware
- Splayds - UK Licence
- Bayonets (during World War II)
- Crystal

== Current ownership ==
The brand is now owned by Liverpool's family-owned Rayware housewares group.

At Viners' original Sheffield site, a DWP office block replaced the cutler's head office, a tile warehouse took over part of what had been the company's manufacturing area and a shopfitting firm used what had been its warehousing space.
