= Tweed theaterworks =

Experimental theater company in Tweed Ontario

TweedTheaterworks, also known as TWEED, Tweed Ensemble, and theatretweed, is an experimental theatre company founded in 1983. It is known for its Fractured Classicks series, satirical interpretations of classic American plays and films that employ unique casting choices; and its critically acclaimed productions featuring performance artist John Kelly, playwrights Bill Russell and Adrienne Kennedy, and drag icons Varla Jean Merman and Lypsinka.

Tweed Theaterworks' mission statement is:

Tweed unearths raw, yet sophisticated, socially relevant artists and material and ushers them to the threshold of acceptability (and often beyond) to cast an irreverent mirror on contemporary culture.

TheaterTweed Inc. was founded in 1983 by Kevin Malony and actress and director Neva Hutchinson. Originally intended as a platform for actors to present adaptations from literature and agent showcases, the company quickly changed focus when Hutchinson moved on and Malony took over as the sole creative director. The original idea behind the use of the word "Tweed" (Theaterworks Emerging in Experimental Directions) was to describe a concept for a production company that wove together different types of live performance. Tweed was one of the first theater companies to embrace performance art, make use of work from that arena, and produce it in off-off-Broadway theaters.

Tweed and Malony rapidly became a part of the thriving early 80s art movement in Manhattan's East Village. The company presented most of its early productions in the many performance clubs located downtown: Limbo Lounge, 8BC, Snafu, Darinka, Limelight, Cat Club, The Club at La MaMa, and most importantly, The Pyramid Club.

For eleven years (1984-1995), the company produced a curated festival of new works—the Tweed New Works Festival, which presented the early works of many of today's recognized theater artists. Among these various productions, Malony presented the first incarnation of John Kelly's Obie-award-winning Pass the Blutwurst, Bitte, acclaimed writer Edgar Oliver's first theatrical work The Seven Year Vacation, and the performance ensemble Watchface. He was the original producer of Bill Russell's Elegies for Angels, Punks and Raging Queens, which ran in London's West End, and Tony Winner Lisa Kron's actual first musical, Dykebar, The Musical.

He directed Paved Paradise Redux (John Kelly's homage to Joni Mitchell) at the Abrons Arts Center and on tour (winner, best touring musical 2011, Austin Texas Critics Circle).

Malony's other writing and directing credits during this time include Brenda Bergman's Her Reality and Endangered Species: The Brenda Bergman Story; Colleen O'Neill as Dr. Julia Wonder in Make My Dreams Your Reality, among many other Julia Wonder shows; drag chanteuse Varla Jean Merman's The Christmas Concert at Carnegie Hall's Weill Recital Hall; Tom Judson's Canned Ham at Dixon Place and on tour; and Joseph Keckler's Midnight Mass at Ars Nova.

In 1996, with longtime company members Stephen Pell and Colleen O'Neill, Malony launched the Tweed Fractured Classicks Series, which presented parodied classic plays and movies featuring unusual, comedic, and often cross-gender casting. Over twenty Fractured Classicks productions have been launched since 1996. The Tweed Fractured Classicks Series presented staged readings and full productions of classic American plays and films featuring unique casting choices.

Reviewing Tweed Fractured Classick "The Mailman Always Comes Twice" in 2002, Neil Genzlinger of the New York Times called the show was a "ribald parody" of The Postman Always Rings Twice (1946). Of Varla Jean Merman's leading performance as "Nora Papadopolous," Genzlinger wrote, "[she had] the Lana [Turner] look pegged pretty definitively, including the legs." Genzlinger described the show as "simply hilarious—a terrific, if indescribable, bit of staging." Tweed Fractured Classicks received Cease and Desist requests for Who's Afraid of Virginia Woolf, Blow Out Your Candles, Laura (The Glass Menagerie), Jungle Red (The Women), and Whaddya Blind?! (Wait Until Dark), which was cancelled after threats from the author.

Malony's longtime creative partner was dancer and choreographer John O'Malley, co-founder of Neo Labos Dance Theater, who died in 2007 after a long battle with AIDS. O'Malley choreographed pieces for Tweed such as "Hotel Martinique" and "Atomic Opera."

Tweed continued to thrive into the 2000s. The long illness and ultimate death of O'Malley curtailed production activity for several months. Around this time, Tweed began partnering with the Howl Festival to present Fractured Classicks and music series to raise money for Howl Help, a project of The Actors Fund. Tweed's relationship with Howl Arts has remained active, and benefits supporting Howl Arts are produced regularly—the most recent being Joni Mitchell: A Birthday Tribute at The Cutting Room in New York City.

Malony has been curating the Tweed's Sundays & 7 series at Pangea for five years. Longtime Tweed artist Carol Lipnik is a frequent performer, and Sundays @ 7 has been the venue where actor/writer David Cale has workshopped his autobiographical musical We Are Only Alive for a Short Amont of Time, which premiered at Chicago's Goodman Theater in Fall 2018. To date, over forty artists have performed in Tweed's Sundays @ 7 series.
