= Johanna Constantine =

Johanna Constantine may refer to:

- Johanna Constantine (comics), a fictional character from The Sandman comics by Neil Gaiman
- Johanna Constantine, a member of the Blacklips theatre group
