= William Vanderpuye =

British actor

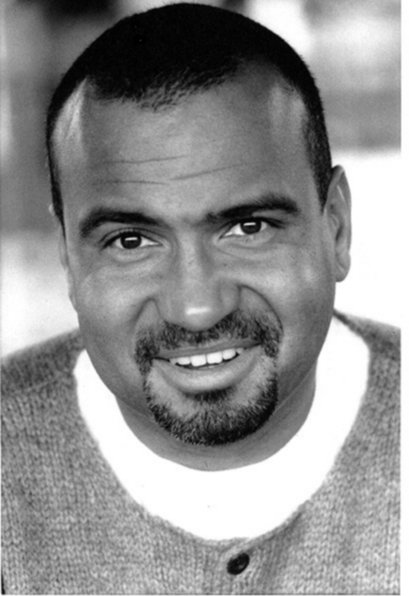
- Other name: Will Vanders
- Occupation: Actor
- Years active: 1971–present

William Vanderpuye, also known as Will Vanderpuye or Will Vanders, is a British actor, broadcaster, writer, voice-over artist and producer.

He played Zoomer and a cast of thousands in the BBC animation series Rastamouse and appeared as "Kobi" in the Bafta nominated BBC series Apple Tree House which he co-created, co wrote and co-produced.

He is the grandson of Jacob Sylvanus Bruce-Vanderpuye, a Barrister-at-Law, Djastse and Ga Mantse (Paramount Chief) of The Otubluhun Stool, Jamestown, Accra, Ghana, formerly the British colony of the Gold Coast. The titles are hereditary, although not used by Vanderpuye or his father William Wallace Bruce-Vanderpuye Snr. The Bruce "Clan" (Nanka Bruce) are an aristocratic Ghanaian family with a pedigree tracing back to King Robert the Bruce of Scotland. The Vanderpuyes are Kings of Elmina dating back to Jacobus Vanderpuye (1780), a nobleman and Dutch Governor-General of the region at St George's Castle Elmina.

Vanderpuye has had a long career consisting of many leading theatrical roles and supporting characters in British films and television programs. He is also a sportscaster, covering combat sports such as kickboxing and mixed martial arts.

== Acting ==
Vanderpuye studied at the Corona Theater-Academy with Nicholas Lyndhurst and Ray Winstone and took exams at the London Academy of Music and Dramatic Art. In 1971, he had his first role at the age of eight in the film Melody, written by Alan Parker and produced by David Putnam. He went on to work extensively with iconic British director Alan Clarke during the late 70s and 80s.

Film roles include Aitch in The Firm with Gary Oldman, and thriller action film Down. He voiced the Hutu radio DJ in the multi-Oscar-nominated Hotel Rwanda and characterized Phillip the dog in the BAFTA- and Oscar-winning film Wallace & Gromit: The Curse of the Were-Rabbit.

He has also appeared in London's Burning, Jonathan Creek, The Brokers Man, Minder (Gunfight at the O.K. Laundrette), One Foot in the Grave, Scum, Touching Evil, The Last Detective, Casualty, and Holby City more recently as Tom Hilton in Death in Paradise on British television. Animations as a voice-over include Budgie the Little Helicopter The Greedysaurus Gang A Monkeys Tale and the BBC's "Fun with Phonics,

Vanderpuye's theater-performances include Reggae Britannia at the Royal Court Theatre, The Great White Hope, Tramway Road with Freddie Jones and Richard E. Grant, and an appearance with Lily Savage in Elegies for Angels, Punks and Raging Queens the off-Broadway production about AIDS.

== Voice acting ==
Will Vanderpuye is a voice-over actor and can be heard regularly on TV and radio. As a video game voice actor, he is well known for providing the voice of the character Patches in each of the latter's appearances across FromSoftware's Dark Souls series and the closely related Bloodborne, Demon's Souls and Elden Ring. Vanderpuye also voiced the Grand Theft Auto series and the 2005 racing video game Juiced as Biggi Mombassa, the leader of the A.W.B crew. He played the Head Honcho in Heart of Darkness and more recently the WW1 game Tungaska, yet to be released. As a voice-actor he has also played characters in the Hobbit trilogy.

He appeared in the films The Curse of the Were-Rabbit, Quest for a Heart, Minions and The Wizard of Oz.

He is the voice to certain promos for the Nickelodeon UK Channels (common with Nick Jr), The Africa Channel, Comedy Central and the Fox International Channels.

== Martial arts ==
Inspired by the Kurosawa Akira-film Seven Samurai, Vanderpuye began studying Shotokan-Karate at the age of 13 earning a brown belt in the discipline. He later switched to Kyokushin in which he currently holds a 3rd Dan black belt. In addition to karate, he has also studied/trained boxing, jujutsu and judo.

In 2002, he began commentating for K-1 and Fight Club on Eurosport under the name Will Vanders (or Sensei Will Vanders) and has commentated to viewing audiences in over fifty countries. He is known for his commentary on past K-1 events, and his catchphrases "it's a knockdooooooown!" and "bye bye Pepsi-Cola, hello holy wine" (a line from the song "The Last Train" by the 1970s rock band The Movies, off their album Bullets through the Barrier.)

His TV production company produces Fight-Sport programs for Eurosport and other major TV channels. He has worked as a broadcaster for the BBC, Sky TV, BT Sport, Fox TV, Abu Dhabi TV, and Channel 4. Presenting for television for K-1, Glory, King of Kings, Superkombat, Legends, Pancrase, Shooto, World Freefight Challenge, KSW and Abu Dhabi Warriors. He is an official AIBA (IOC) and World Series of Boxing commentator.
