= Meseritz =

Meseritz may refer to:

- Kreis Meseritz, a historical administrative subdivision of Posen District
- German name for Międzyrzec Podlaski, a city in Lublin Voivodeship, Poland
  - Meserich Synagogue, New York
- German name for Międzyrzecz, a town in Lubusz Voivodeship, Poland
- the medieval terra Meseritz south of Gützkow, Western Pomerania, now Jarmen
- Dov Ber of Meseritz
