= Eurosport =

European television sports network

- Logo used since 2015

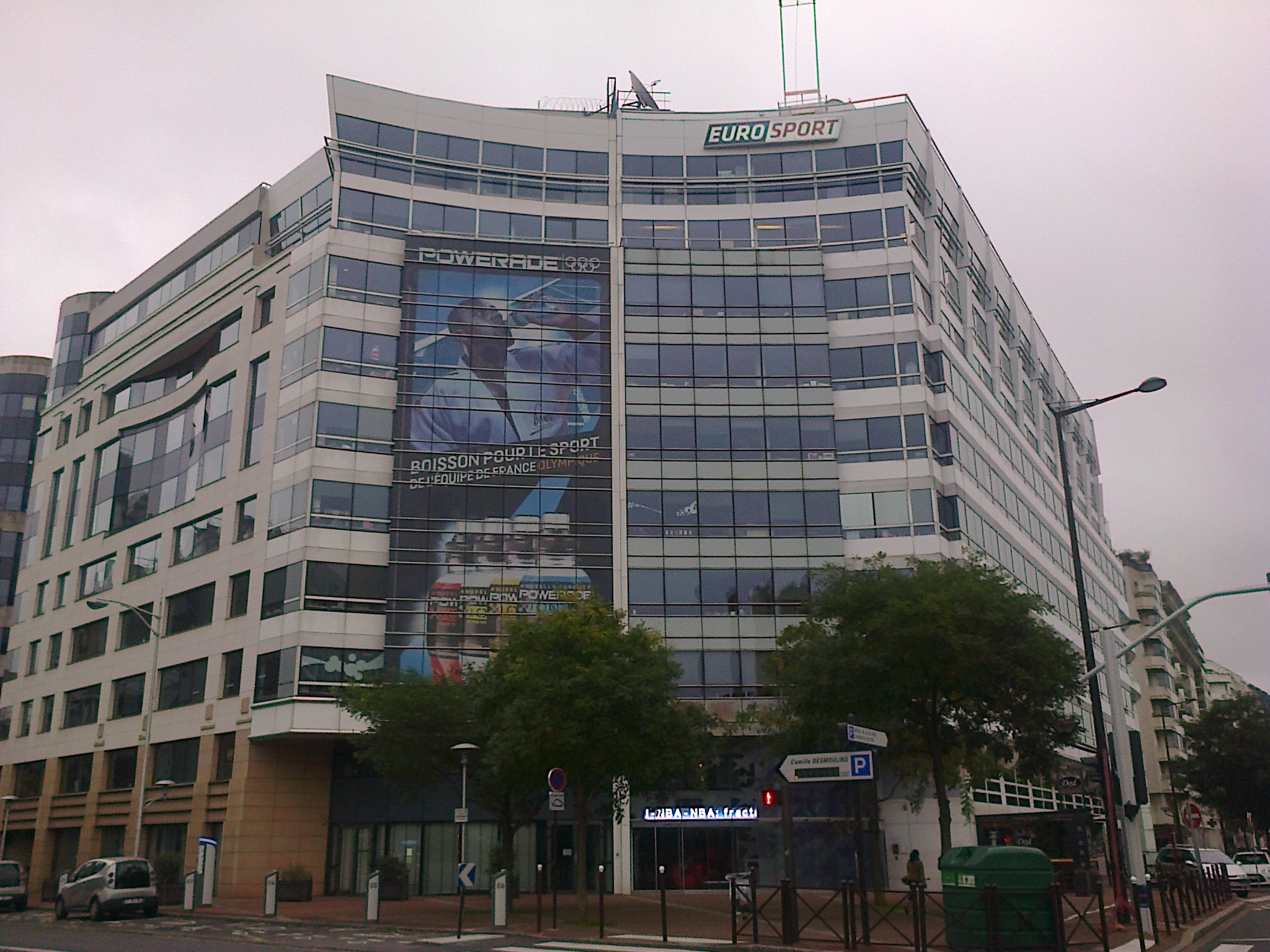
- Eurosport headquarters in Issy-les-Moulineaux.
- Type: Division
- Industry: Sportscasting
- Founded: 5 February 1989; 37 years ago
- Headquarters: Issy-les-Moulineaux, France
- Area served: France; Central and Eastern Europe; Asia-Pacific; Portugal; Spain; Italy; Germany; Turkey; Nordic; Benelux; India; Latvia
- Brands: Eurosport 1; Eurosport 2
- Owner: Skydance Corporation
- Parent: TNT Sports
- Website: www.eurosport.com

Eurosport is a French pan-European group of pay television networks in Europe and parts of Asia that operates two main channels—Eurosport 1 and Eurosport 2—across most of its territories, and streams on HBO Max and Discovery+. It is a subsidiary of TNT Sports International, a division of Skydance Corporation.

Originally a joint venture between the European Broadcasting Union and Sky established in 1989, it was briefly shut down in 1991 following complaints by competitor Screensport. It was subsequently acquired by TF1 Group, and later merged with Screensport. For a period, it was a joint venture between TF1, Canal+ Group, and Havas Images. TF1 Group later bought out the other owners' shares. In 2012, Discovery Communications began to take an ownership in Eurosport, eventually leading to a full buyout in 2015.

Eurosport is the main rights holder of the Olympic Games in most of Europe, as well as, with some exceptions, the tennis Grand Slam tournaments.

The network of channels is available in 54 countries, in 21 different languages, providing viewers with European and international sporting events. Eurosport had 157 million subscribers in 2019, while the Eurosport 2 channel had an audience of 87 million viewers. For the most part, there is no on-screen presenter, only unseen commentators, allowing the same video feed to be used in multiple markets with different language audio.

== History ==
Original Eurosport logo in use from 1989 until 1994

Prior to the creation of Eurosport, the European Broadcasting Union had acquired substantial amounts of sports rights, yet its members were only able to broadcast a fraction of them. This provided the impetus for setting up the Eurosport Consortium, made up of several EBU members, to establish an outlet where these rights could be exploited. Sky Television was chosen as a commercial partner to the EBU project, and the channel launched at 6pm on 5 February 1989. It largely replaced the original Sky Channel (later rebranded Sky One) on European cable systems after Sky Channel refocused to serve only the United Kingdom and Ireland although for a period of time, some of Sky Channel's former pan-European programming was broadcast in the hours before Eurosport's startup, under the brand Sky Europe.

=== 1991 closure, takeover by TF1 ===
Eurosport was closed down in May 1991 after rival Screensport channel filed a complaint to the European Commission over the corporate structure. The channel was saved later that month when the TF1 Group (formed after the French government privatised the post ORTF-split TF1 5 years prior to the acquisition) stepped in to replace BSkyB as joint owners. It was able to restart its broadcast after 10 days. Broadcasting hours were restricted to 1pm to 11pm, later 8am until midnight before settling at 7.30am and 1am. Its overnight hours were occupied by shopping channel The Quantum Channel.

Eurosport logo adopting TF1's colours, used from 1994 to 2000 designed by McCann-Erickson

On 1 March 1993, the cable and satellite channel Screensport merged with Eurosport. As a result, Eurosport International was co-owned by the TF1 Group, (operator), Canal+ Group and ESPN Inc, with Générale d'Images (later rebranded Havas Images) as a fourth shareholder of the French operations. Five days later, Screensport's transponder space was taken over by RTL II. In May 2000, ESPN sold its shares of Eurosport to TF1 and Canal+. In January 2001, TF1 took full ownership of Eurosport.

Logo used from 2000 to 2011

=== Eurosport Player & rebrand ===
In May 2007, Yahoo! Europe and Eurosport formed a co-branded website which Eurosport used as its web portal, including an online TV guide, in the United Kingdom, Ireland, Spain, Italy and Germany.

In 2008, Eurosport launched an online subscription service, Eurosport Player, that allows internet users to watch both Eurosport and Eurosport 2 live, plus additional coverage not available via broadcast. During the 2009 Australian Open, the internet player offered coverage from five courts.

Logo used from 2011 to 2015, part of a rebrand undertaken by Les Télécréateurs.

On 5 April 2011, Eurosport rebranded its channel. The rebrand incorporated six new on-air idents along with a new logo and presentation style both on-air and off-air. The new on-air identity has been designed by Paris-based design company Les Télécréateurs. All localised Eurosport channels and the Eurosport website embraced the new identity.

=== Analogue closedown ===
Having been one of the first channels to broadcast on the Astra 1 group of satellites, Eurosport was the last satellite channel in Europe to broadcast in an analogue format. On 30 April 2012, shortly after 03:00 CET, the rest of the remaining analogue channels at 19.2 East ceased transmission. Eurosport's analogue channel finally ceased transmission on 1 May 2012 at 01:30 CET, marking the end of an era in European satellite broadcasting.

=== Stake and acquisition by Discovery Communications ===
On 21 December 2012, Discovery Communications purchased a 20 per cent minority interest share in Eurosport from TF1 Group for €170m. Discovery became the majority shareholder in the Eurosport venture with TF1 in January 2014, taking a 51% share of the company. On 22 July 2015 Discovery agreed to acquire TF1's remaining stake in the venture.

On 13 November 2015, Eurosport introduced its new brand identity and changed the name of its main channel to Eurosport 1.

In 2016, Eurosport expanded its deal with The All England Club to show all the Wimbledon matches live in 19 countries, up from three under a previous deal. It was a 3-year deal (2017–2019) that included exclusive TV and digital rights. This expanded their tennis portfolio to show all four Grand Slams. Eurosport signed a new deal in 2019 to broadcast Wimbledon exclusively in 11 countries. As of 2021, Eurosport broadcasts the Australian Open, French Open (except in France), US Open (except in the United Kingdom and Ireland), and Wimbledon (except in the United Kingdom).

In February 2017, Discovery launched the channel in India, branded as DSport which was later renamed to Eurosport in 2020.

On 5 January 2021, Discovery began to phase out Eurosport Player in favour of its new streaming service Discovery+.

=== Warner Bros. Discovery, folding of UK operations into TNT Sports ===
On 11 May 2022, Warner Bros. Discovery (WBD)—a company formed after the merger of Discovery and WarnerMedia—announced an agreement to contribute Eurosport's United Kingdom operations into a joint venture with BT Group. WBD would serve as managing partner, with Eurosport's UK operations to be merged with the BT Sport networks. As part of the agreement, WBD also negotiated a deal for BT Group to distribute Discovery+ to its television and BT Sport subscribers.

WBD would rebrand BT Sport as TNT Sports, deriving its name from its American cable network. In January 2025, it was announced that Eurosport would close in the United Kingdom and Ireland on 28 February 2025, in favour of carrying Eurosport content via TNT Sports channels and platforms. The remaining international channels will continue to operate under the Eurosport brand.

== Channels ==
=== Eurosport 1 ===
Eurosport 1 logo since November 2015

This is the main channel of Eurosport. A high-definition simulcast version of Eurosport launched on 25 May 2008. The first event covered in HD was the 2008 French Open at Roland Garros. On 13 November 2015, it changed its name to Eurosport 1 HD.

==== Eurosport 1 feeds ====
In Europe, Eurosport 1 is generally available in basic cable and satellite television packages. Since 1999, Eurosport 1 provides various opt-out services providing more relevant sporting content specific to language, advertising and commentary needs. Eurosport offers a stand-alone channel which provides a standardised version of the channel (Eurosport International in English). Alongside this, there are also local Eurosport channels in France, Spain, United Kingdom, Italy, Germany, Poland, Nordic region, Benelux region, and Asia Pacific. These channels offer greater sporting content with local sporting events, while also utilising the existing pan-European feed. The German version of Eurosport is the only one available free-to-air on European digital satellite television.

Eurosport 1 is currently broadcast in 25 languages: English, French, German, Italian, Spanish, Portuguese, Dutch, Swedish, Norwegian, Danish, Finnish, Icelandic, Russian, Polish, Czech, Slovak, Hungarian, Romanian, Bulgarian, Serbian, Greek, Turkish, Cantonese, Croatian (formerly) and Ukrainian.

In Asia-Pacific territories, Eurosport offers a specific channel to the region. Eurosport (Asia-Pacific) launched on 15 November 2009. The service is available in Australia through Foxtel, Optus and TransACT. On 3 November 2014, a HD simulcast launched on Foxtel.

=== Eurosport 2 ===
Eurosport 2 logo since November 2015

A supplementary channel featuring more live sports events, programming and news updates. Eurosport 2 launched on 10 January 2005 and is currently available in 35 countries, broadcasting in 22 different languages. (Note: English, Swedish, Norwegian, Icelandic, Finnish, French, Italian, German, Greek, Hungarian, Russian, Bulgarian, Polish, Portuguese, Romanian, Serbian, Turkish, Czech, Slovak, Danish, Dutch, Spanish and Croatian.)

Eurosport 2 describes itself as "the new generation sports channel", dedicated to team sports, alternative sports, discovery and entertainment including basketball (like the Italian LBA), Twenty20 Cricket, Bundesliga, National Lacrosse League, Arena Football League, surfing, Volleyball Champions League, Australian Rules Football matches from the Australian Football League, Bandy World Championships and more. Eurosport 2 was branded as Eurosport DK in Denmark. On 15 February 2016, this channel was replaced by Eurosport 2. Eurosport 2 HD, a high-definition version of the channel, is also available.

Eurosport 2 HD Xtra is a German pay-TV channel launched in 2017. Eurosport bought Germany-only rights for Bundesliga, Supermoto and other broadcasting rights. Eurosport 2 has no German-only signal and Eurosport 1 is free-to-air, so the new channel was needed.

=== Eurosport 3 / 4 ===
In April 2026, Eurosport introduced two additional channels, Eurosport 3 and Eurosport 4 in Poland. They provide coverage of additional sporting events, including NBA games, Speedway Grand Prix and tennis.

=== Eurosport India ===
Eurosport India logo used since 2020

The initial logo of DSport used from February 2017 to March 2020, adapted from Eurosport logo.

Eurosport (formerly known as DSport) is an Indian pay television sports channel owned by Warner Bros. Discovery India for the Indian subcontinent. It was launched as DSport in February 2017 with a partnership between Discovery India and Lex Sportel. In January 2020, Lex Sportel parted ways with Discovery, creating their own channel 1Sports. During its initial days the channel aired Brazilian, Chinese and Portuguese football leagues along with Major League Soccer (US) and live racing from the UK and Irish tracks. In golf, the channel aired British Open (The Open Championship), US Open, PGA Championship and LPGA. Additionally, It had also acquired rugby and cycling properties for the channel.

In January 2020, Lex Sportel (the content provider for Dsport) parted ways with Discovery, taking their event rights from this channel and created their own channel 1Sports. On 17 March 2020, Ministry of Information and Broadcasting permitted Discovery to finally rename the channel Eurosport.

The channel revealed its new brand identity, highlighting its mission to 'Unlock the Power of Sport'. Alongside the visual identity, it also launched a soundtrack, that is a thumping heartbeat.

Other sports it broadcasts:

- Futsal Club Championship
- Davis Cup
- All Elite Wrestling
- TNA Wrestling
- FIFA Club World Cup

== Former channels ==
=== British Eurosport ===
In the United Kingdom, British Eurosport launched on 18 January 1999, replacing Eurosport International on most platforms, with some schedule variations and local commentary. The launch of British Eurosport and the creation of programming specifically for the United Kingdom was initially funded by Premium TV, which did not have a stake in the sports channel, but received a share of the revenue. British Eurosport had live studio presentations of major sporting events and tournaments.

On British Eurosport, James Richardson previously hosted the coverage of Serie A football on the Channel from 2002 to 2005 and UEFA Euro 2004 with regular guests, including Alan Curbishley, DJ Spoony, former Chelsea players Paul Elliott, Ed de Goey, Ray Wilkins, Roberto Di Matteo and Carlo Cudicini, former England international Luther Blissett and European football journalists Gabriele Marcotti and Xavier Rivoire.

Will Vanders was known for his coverage of K-1 events, and greeted the viewers in Japanese, Korean, Chinese, and Thai to introduce the martial arts show, Fight Club, on Monday nights.

For tennis, studio presentation for the Australian Open, French Open, U.S. Open and WTA Tour Championships on British Eurosport was hosted by Annabel Croft with the segment Hawk-Eye presented by former British number 2 Jason Goodall.

British Eurosport covered the snooker season, including ranking events not broadcast by BBC Television such as the Shanghai Masters and China Open. Neal Foulds and former world champion Joe Johnson were among the commentators.

Tour de France coverage in 2014 was commentated on by Carlton Kirby (following the departure of David Harmon) with veteran cyclist Sean Kelly as the "technical expert". The duo continued to commentate in 2015 and an additional pre- and post-programme was broadcast, "Lemond on Tour". This was presented by Ashley House with comment and analysis from Eurosport Cycling Ambassador Greg LeMond. Additional interviews were provided by Spanish cycling journalist Laura Meseguer and former pro racing cyclist Juan Antonio Flecha.

David Goldstrom commentated on ski jumping and ski flying coverage from 1999.

On 10 February 2009, British Eurosport started to broadcast most of its programming in the 16:9 'widescreen' ratio. After the collapse of Setanta Sports, rights for the 2009 season in the USPGA Golf tour reverted to British Eurosport.

On 25 July 2012, British Eurosport HD launched on the Sky, UPC Ireland and Virgin Media platforms in the United Kingdom and Ireland, which replaced the pan-European Eurosport HD. British Eurosport 2 HD launched on 3 September 2012 on the Sky platform. Virgin Media has also carried Eurosport 3D to broadcast the 2011 and 2012 French Open and 2012 Summer Olympics. UPC Ireland also broadcast Eurosport 3D for the 2011 French Open. Throughout the duration of the 2012 Summer Olympics, Eurosport 3D also broadcast on the Sky 3D channel.

On 13 November 2015, British Eurosport was replaced by localised versions of Eurosport 1 and Eurosport 1 HD.

=== Eurosport (3–5) ===
Eurosport 3, Eurosport 4 and Eurosport 5 (and their HD equivalents) were additional channels created for the 2018 Winter Olympics broadcasting Olympic Broadcasting Services live and highlights streams for the duration of the Olympic Winter Games.. The channels returned for the 2022 Winter Olympics, but not for the 2026 Winter Olympics.

Seven additional channels, from Eurosport 3 to Eurosport 9 were created for the 2020 Summer Olympics and 2024 Summer Olympics.

=== Eurosport 3D ===
In April 2010, Eurosport 3D launched but was only broadcast during a select number of events, such as the French Open and 2012 Summer Olympics.

=== Eurosport Australia ===
Eurosport Australia was a short-lived sports television channel available until 7 December 2020. It was available on Fetch TV until the contract between Eurosport and Fetch TV ended.

=== Eurosport DK ===
Eurosport DK was a Danish television channel owned by Discovery Networks Northern Europe. The channel replaced Canal 8 Sport and Eurosport 2 in Denmark on 1 July 2015.

On 28 May 2015, Discovery Networks Northern Europe announced that they would merge Canal 8 Sport and Eurosport 2 into Eurosport DK in Denmark, broadcasting football from Danish Superliga, the Bundesliga, Major League Soccer, Capital One Cup, UEFA Euro 2016 qualifying, tennis from ATP Tour, WTA Tour and 3 Grand Slams, cycling from UCI World Tour, Winter sport, Motorsports.

On 15 February 2016, the channel was replaced by Eurosport 2.

=== Eurosport Croatia ===
The Croatian-language feed of Eurosport 1 and 2 was launched on 19 November 2016. However, two major cable television providers Vipnet/B.net and Hrvatski Telekom cancelled the agreement with Discovery Networks in January and February 2018, respectively. This included dropping Eurosport channels from their offerings, so availability was limited to less popular services. The feed was shut down on 30 June 2018, and was reverted to the English-language version. The channels were eventually returned to both providers' offerings in late 2025, but were still broadcast in English.

=== Eurosport News ===
Eurosport News logo since November 2015

Eurosport Events logo since November 2015

A sports news channel was on air from 1 September 2000 to 4 January 2018, featuring live scores, highlights, breaking news and commentary. It was available in 11 million homes in 54 countries. The service combined video, text and graphics with the screen divided into 4 parts: a video section displaying highlights and news bulletins, a breaking news ticker at the bottom and a scoring section for in-depth analysis of results and game stats.

=== Eurosport EPL Romania ===
Eurosport EPL Romania was a channel owned by Eurosport, which broadcast the English Premier League in Romania. It acquired the rights from the Premier League to broadcast the 2013–14 Premier League season. It was closed in 2022.

==== Programming ====
- IAAF Diamond League Athletics
- European Athletics Championships
- FIBA EuroBasket
- Milan-San Remo Cycling
- Paris-Roubaix
- Amstel Gold Race
- ATP Tour 250
- Liège–Bastogne–Liège
- Giro d'Italia
- Vuelta a España
- Giro di Lombardia
- Presidents Cup
- FIA World Endurance Championship
- 24 Hours of Le Mans

=== Eurosport Gold ===
Eurosport Gold Russia was a channel owned by Eurosport which broadcast the National Hockey League in Russia. It acquired the rights from the NHL to broadcast the 2017–18 NHL season.

On 9 March 2022, Discovery Inc. closed Eurosport Gold due to Russia's invasion of Ukraine.

=== Eurosport Norway ===
Eurosport Norway is a Norwegian television channel that replaced Eurosport 2 on 3 September 2015. It is owned by Discovery Networks Norway and broadcasts Norwegian eliteserien and other Eurosport programming.

== Viewing share Eurosport 1 ==
As an international channel, Eurosport's performance differs significantly between countries. The figures below show Eurosport 1's share of overall viewing in some countries.

Country	2003	2004	2005	2006	2007	2008	2009	2010	2011	2012	2013	2014	2015	2016	2018	2019	2020	2021	2022	2023
Bulgaria					0.5%	0.6%														
Finland (10+)					0.6%	0.7%	0.7%		1.0%											
France			1.9%	1.4%	1.6%	1.4%			0.6%											
Italy						0.0%														
Germany (3+)				0.9%	1.0%	0.9%	0.9%	0.7%	0.7%	0.7%	0.7%	0.6%	0.7%	0.6%						
Netherlands (6+)	0.8%	0.8%	0.9%	0.9%	0.9%	0.9%	0.8%	0.8%	0.9%	0.9%	0.7%	0.6%	0.7%	0.6%						
Poland (4+)				0.5%	0.5%	0.5%			0.6%	0.8%										
Romania (4+)						0.7%									0.4%	0.4%	0.3%	0.4%	0.3%	0.3%
Sweden (3-99)				1.6%	1.4%	0.9%			0.6%											
United Kingdom				0.3%	0.2%	0.2%														

== Sporting events ==
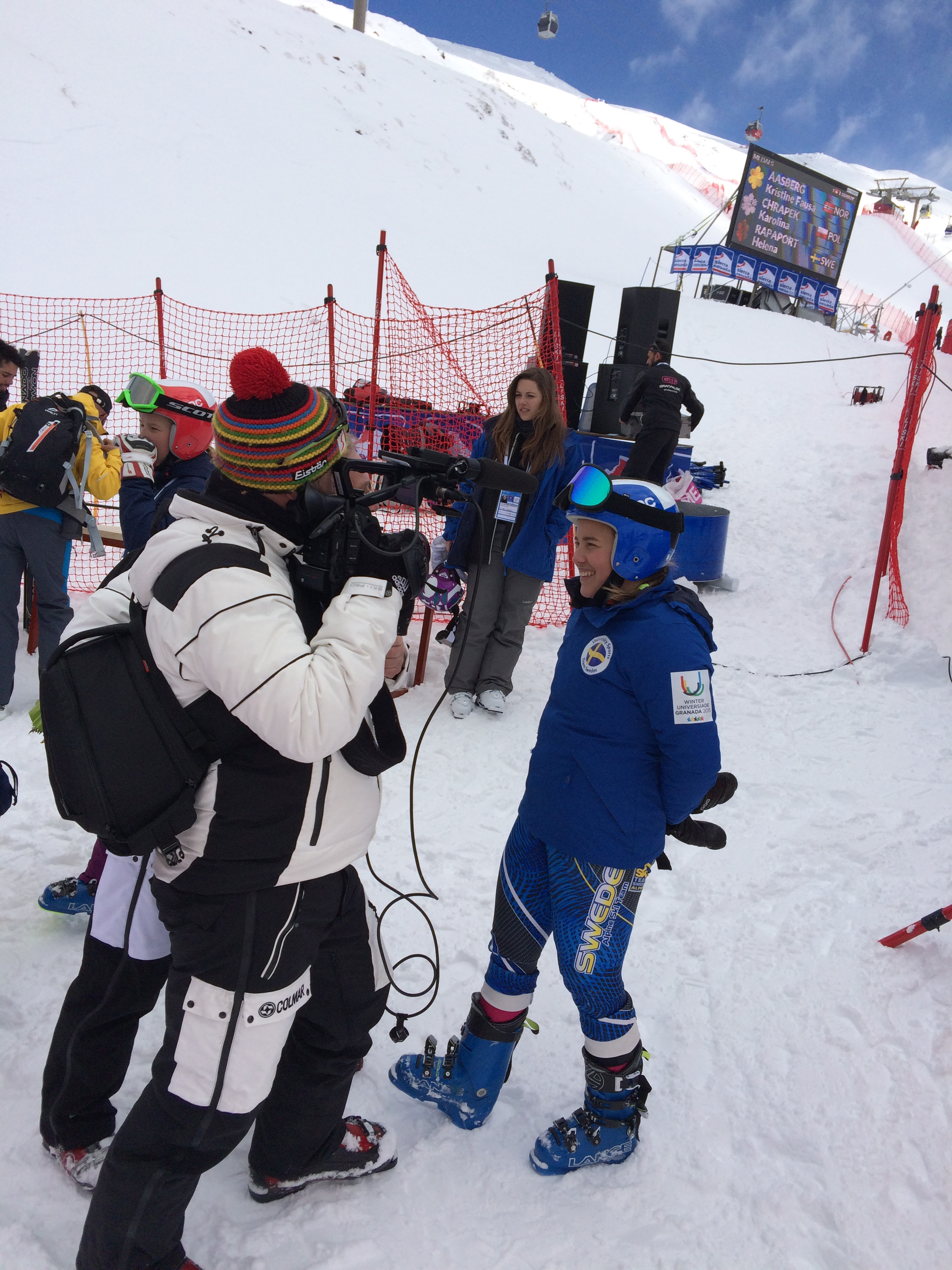
Eurosport staff conducting an interview at the 2015 Winter Universiade's Alpine skiing event.

Eurosport provides viewers with European and international sporting events. It broadcasts different sporting events in each region. This includes several football competitions:

- AIFF Super Cup
- Frauen-Bundesliga (only for Austria, Germany, Liechtenstein, and Switzerland)
- FA Cup (only for Denmark, Italy and Sweden)
- FA Community Shield (only for Sweden)
- Coupe de France (only for France)
- Eliteserien
- Allsvenskan (only for Finland, Romania and Sweden)
- Superettan
- Major League Soccer (only for India)
- UEFA Nations League (only for Denmark)
- Africa Cup of Nations (only for Ireland, Portugal, Spain, and UK)
- Nepal T20 League

Other sports events include the Paris Dakar Rally, the Monte Carlo Rally, athletics events such as World Athletics Championships and the European Athletics Championships, cycling events such as the Tour de France, Giro d'Italia (except France) and the Vuelta a España, tennis events including the French Open, Australian Open, Wimbledon (31 European territories) and the US Open, the World Championship Snooker, National Hockey League (only for Russia), World Boxing Super Series (only for Spain), and action sports like skating and surfing.

Under BSkyB, the channel - like other Sky TV channels - screened American professional wrestling from the WWF. After the TF1 Group takeover, this was replaced with European professional wrestling, billed as New Catch, filmed mostly in France (with some German CWA and regional American matches). In the UK, the commentator was Orig Williams. The first season had already been premiered on the original TF1 channel - the ancestral home of French TV wrestling - in 1988. The Eurosport run consisted of a repeat of this, followed on by the premiere of the second season. From the mid-1990s until 2007, Eurosport broadcast dubbed Japanese professional wrestling (puroresu) episodes of NJPW World Pro-Wrestling series and other major shows for various continental markets. They also used to broadcast UWFi in 2006, 2007 with English commentary or with various other languages where the channel was broadcast. They also used to broadcast TNA wrestling from 2006 until 2008, they broadcast episodes and edited pay per views without interviews. In Italy, Paolo Lanati was the commentator for NJPW, TNA and UWFi.

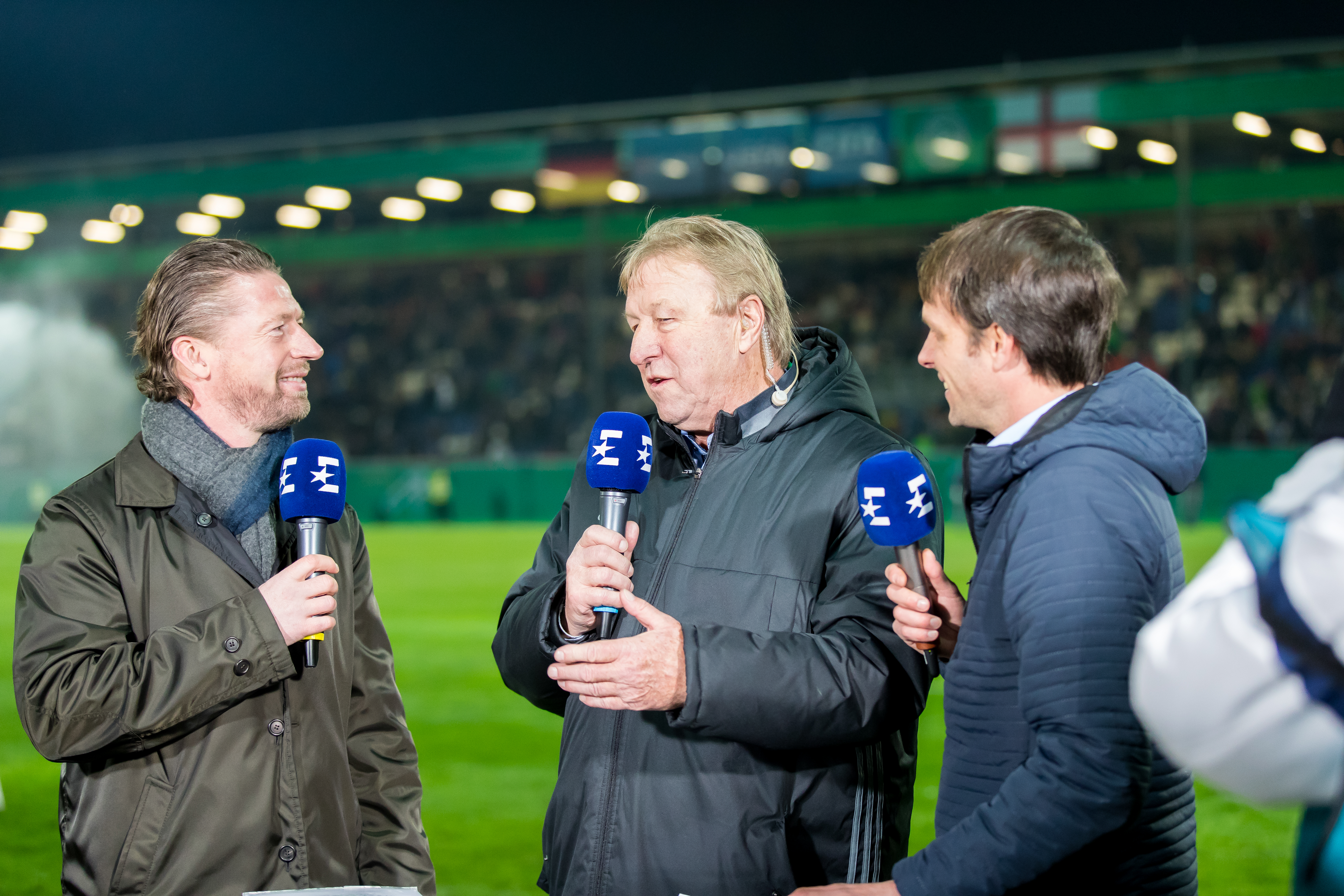
Steffen Freund and Horst Hrubesch in discussion on Eurosport at the under-21 football international between England and Germany in 2017.

In June 2015, it was announced that Eurosport had secured the pan-European rights (except Russia) to the winter and summer Olympic Games between 2018 and 2024.

In July 2017, Eurosport had secured the domestic and international rights from 2017 to 2020 of the Italian Lega Basket Serie A (LBA). Eurosport is the new owner of the pay TV, international and internet rights. Eurosport has TV rights also for Italian Basketball Supercup and Italian Basketball Cup.

In October 2018, Eurosport has reached an agreement with the World Boxing Super Series for the exclusive acquisition of the Competition's broadcast rights in Spain

In October 2018, Eurosport sealed a 3-year deal to show British Darts Organisation major events BDO World Darts Championship, World Masters (darts) & World Trophy

In January 2019, it was announced that Eurosport will screen 39 ATP tennis tournaments including the tour finals in Russia for 3 years.

=== Motorsport ===
Discovery Sports Events (formerly known as Eurosport Events and before that 'KSO Kigema Sports Organisation Ltd.') is the Eurosport group's sporting events management / promotion / production division, which promotes the FIA European Rally Championship and previously the FIA World Touring Car Cup (WTCR).

Eurosport Events was also the promoter of the Intercontinental Rally Challenge, a rival rallying series to the World Rally Championship, and of the FIA European Touring Car Cup. The IRC ceased at the end of the 2012 season, with Eurosport taking over series promotion of the ERC from 2013. The European Touring Car Cup was active until 2017.

Since 2008, the Eurosport Group has also been broadcasting the annual 24 Hours of Le Mans in full.

Eurosport airs MotoGP in India, previously it had broadcasting rights in various territories including the Netherlands, Belgium, Romania, France and Germany. The network also airs Superbike World Championship in multiple European countries.

Since 2008, Eurosport airs British Superbikes for UK broadcasts and World Feed.

On 29 September 2015, Eurosport acquired the Portuguese broadcasting rights for Formula One between 2016 and 2018.

On 30 September, Eurosport and FIM announced that they had signed a contract regarding partnership for FIM's international speedway championships where Eurosport will be the promotor for 10 years. They also announced a deal to show SGB Premiership matches live throughout the season.

Eurosport airs Formula E across Western and Central Europe, except in Germany and Italy.

The network also airs Malaysian Cub Prix in multiple European countries.

=== Football ===
Competition	Region	Broadcast Details
FA Cup	Denmark	Live until 2024
FA Community Shield	Sweden	Live until 2024
Danish Superliga	Denmark	Two matches (second and fifth picks) per week live until 2024
French women's football league	France	
Allsvenskan	Bulgaria, Finland, France, Italy, Norway, Portugal, Romania, Spain, Sweden	All matches live through 2026

=== Tennis ===
Competition	Region	Broadcast Details
Australian Open	Pan-European	All matches live through 2031
Roland Garros	Pan-European exc. France	All matches live through 2026
Wimbledon	Belgium, Bulgaria, Czech Republic, Finland, Hungary, Iceland, Netherlands, Norway, Romania, Slovakia, Sweden	All matches live through 2027
US Open	Pan-European exc. Germany, Ireland, Italy, United Kingdom	All matches live through 2027
ATP Tour Masters 1000	France	All matches live through 2026
ATP 500	France	All matches live through 2026

^3- from 2020 qualifiers

=== Basketball ===
Competition	Region	Broadcast Details
EuroLeague	Ireland, Italy, United Kingdom	
EuroCup	Ireland, Italy, Poland, United Kingdom	
Basketball Champions League	Ireland, Italy, Poland, United Kingdom	

== See also ==
- Broadcasting of sports events
- Eurosport Fight Club
- List of sports television channels
