= East Village/Lower East Side Historic District =

Historic district in Manhattan, New York

Coordinates: 40°43′36″N 73°59′20″W

- Lower East Side Historic District
- U.S. National Register of Historic Places
- U.S. Historic district
- New York State Register of Historic Places
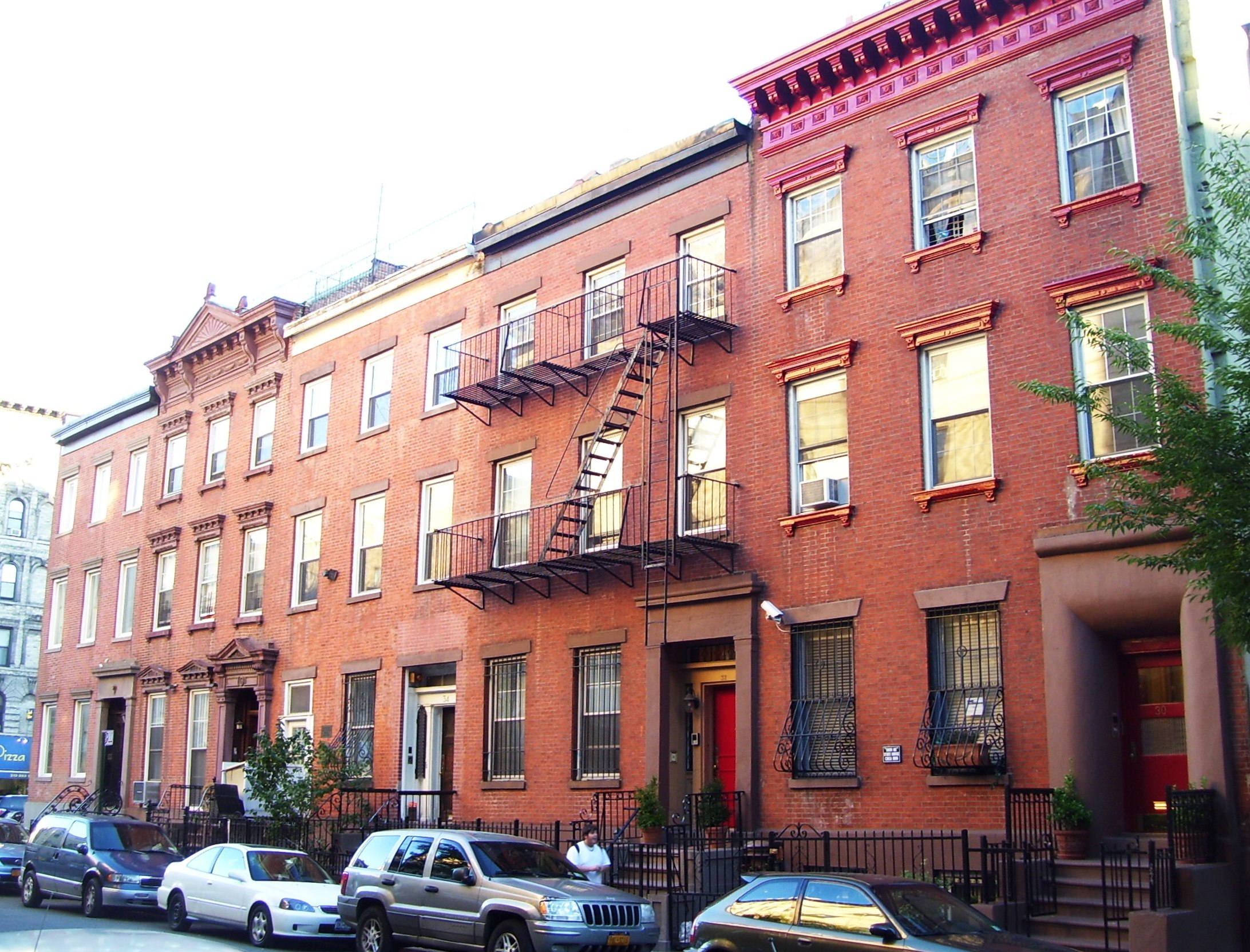
- Greek Revival row houses on 3rd Street

- Location within Manhattan Location within New York City Location within New York
- Location: Roughly bounded by Allen St., E. Houston, Essex St., Canal St., Eldridge St., E. Broadway, and Grand St., New York, New York
- Area: 62 acres (25 ha)
- Built: 1867
- Architect: Herter Brothers; Scneider and Herter, et al.
- Architectural style: Greek Revival, Italianate, et al.
- NRHP reference No.: 00001015
- Lower East Side Historic District (Boundary Increase)
- U.S. National Register of Historic Places
- U.S. Historic district
- New York State Register of Historic Places
- Location: Roughly along Division, Rutger, Madison, Henry, Grand Sts., New York, New York
- Area: 32 acres (13 ha)
- Built: 1868
- Architectural style: Greek Revival, et al.
- NRHP reference No.: 04000297

Significant dates
- Added to NRHP: May 2, 2006
- Designated NYSRHP: January 22, 2004

Significant dates
- Added to NRHP: September 7, 2000
- Designated NYSRHP: July 11, 2000

The East Village/Lower East Side Historic District in Lower Manhattan, New York City was created by the New York City Landmarks Preservation Commission on October 9, 2012. It encompasses 330 buildings, mostly in the East Village neighborhood, primarily along Second Avenue between East 2nd and 6th Streets, and along the side streets. Some of the buildings are located in a second area between First Avenue and Avenue A along East 6th and 7th Streets. The district is based on the one which had been proposed by the Greenwich Village Society for Historic Preservation, with only minor changes, and is the result of a two-year effort to protect the area.

Significant buildings which are located within the district include Congregation Adas Yisroel Anshe Mezeritz Synagogue at 415 East 6th Street, the OCA Cathedral of the Protection of the Holy Virgin at 59 East 2nd Street, the Community Synagogue at 323 East 6th Street which was originally the Evangelical Lutheran Church of St. Matthew, from which parish many of the victims of the General Slocum disaster came, the building housing the Pyramid Club at 101 Avenue A, and the Middle Collegiate Church at 112 Second Avenue. In addition the district features many row houses and tenements in the Greek Revival style, and numerous buildings constructed for the German immigrants who dominated the neighborhood in the late 19th and early 20th centuries. The district also includes the theatres on East 4th Street between Second Avenue and the Bowery, which the city has named a cultural district, as well as several remnants of the theatres on Second Avenue when Yiddish theatre thrived there and it was called the "Jewish Rialto".

Three buildings contributing to this district were destroyed in the East Village gas explosion on March 26, 2015.

== Gallery ==
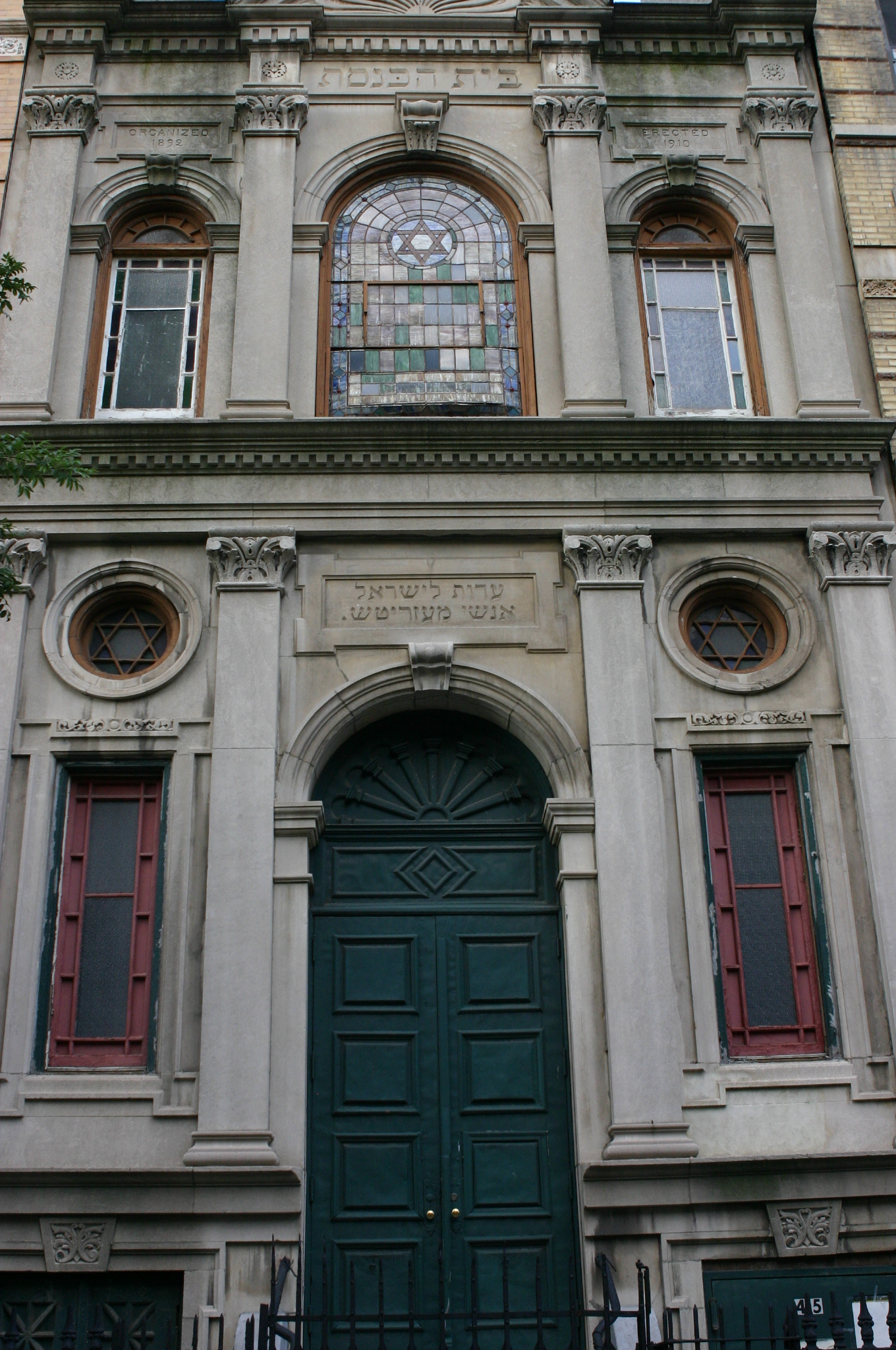
Congregation Adas Yisroel Anshe Mezeritz

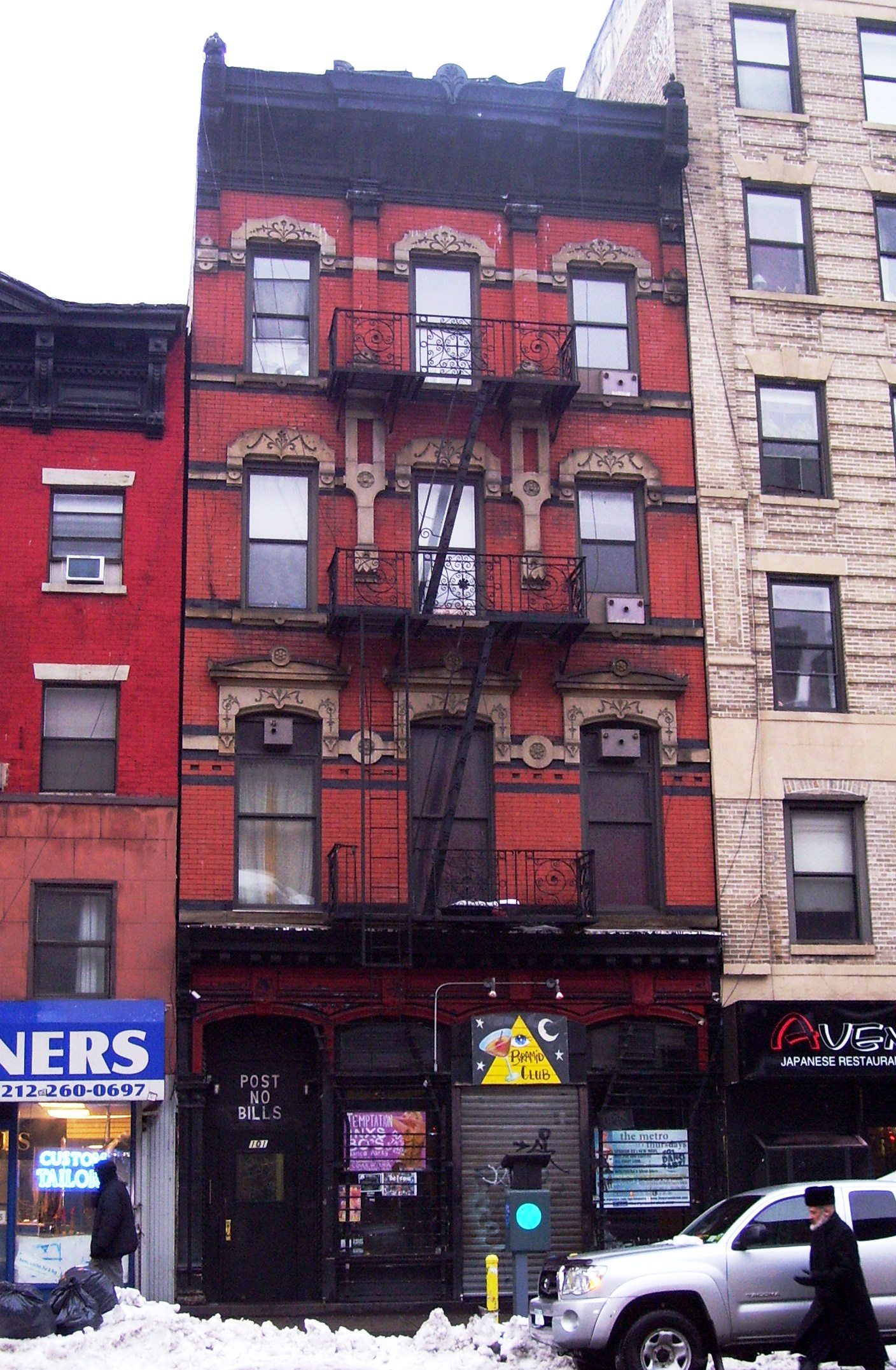
101 Avenue A, built in 1876, location of the Club

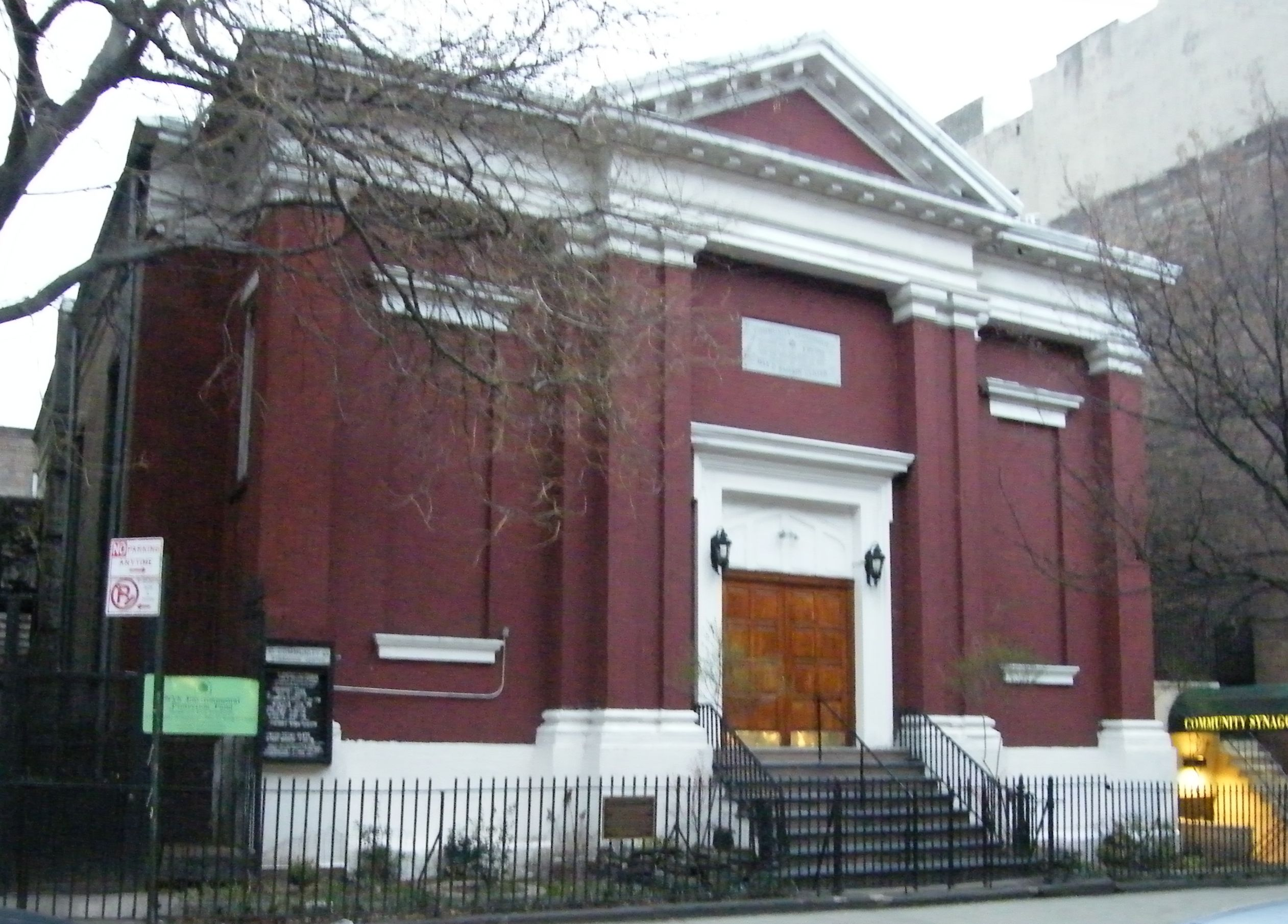
Community Synagogue, formerly St. Matthews Evangelical Lutheran Church

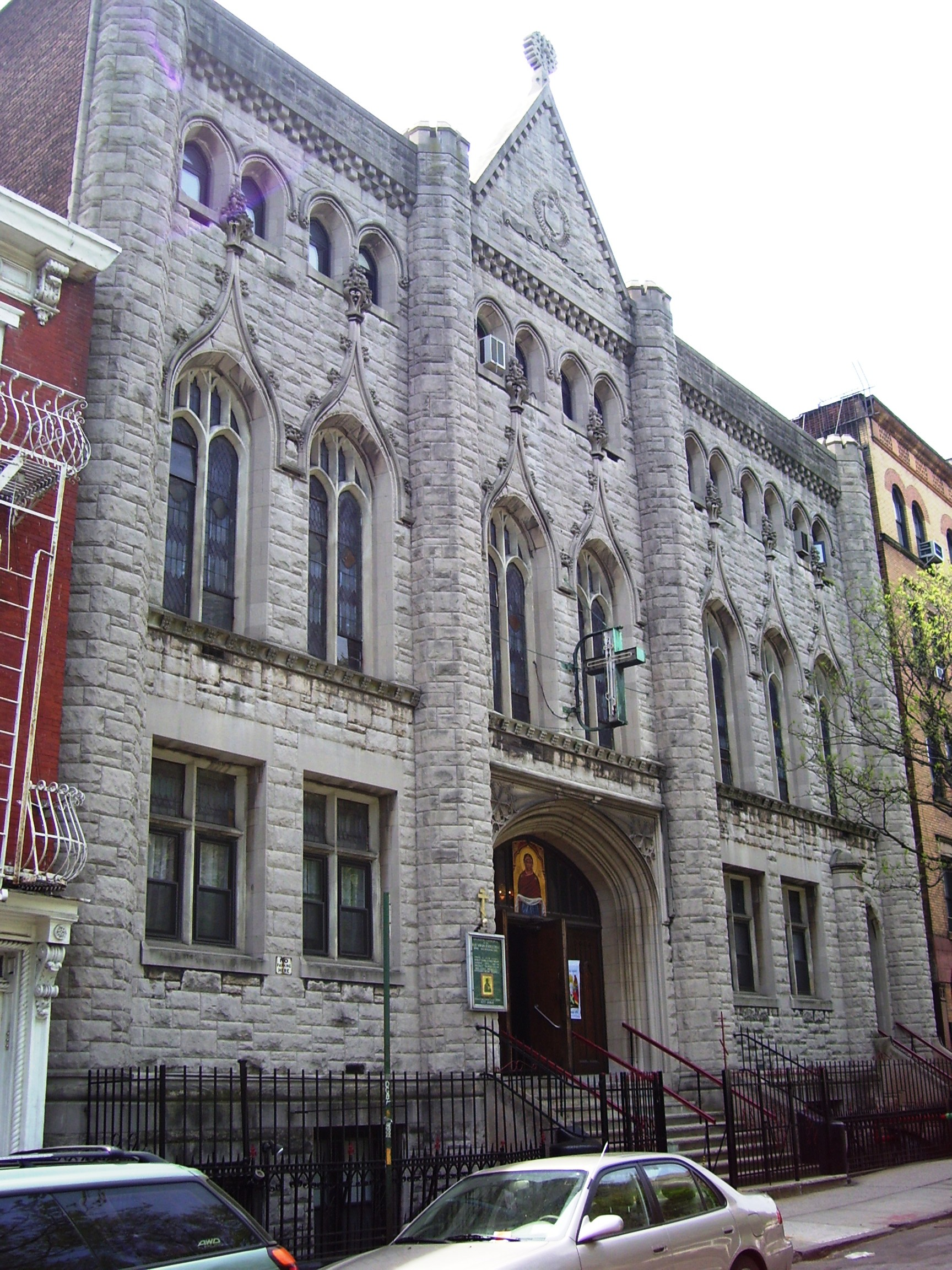
Cathedral of the Protection of the Holy Virgin

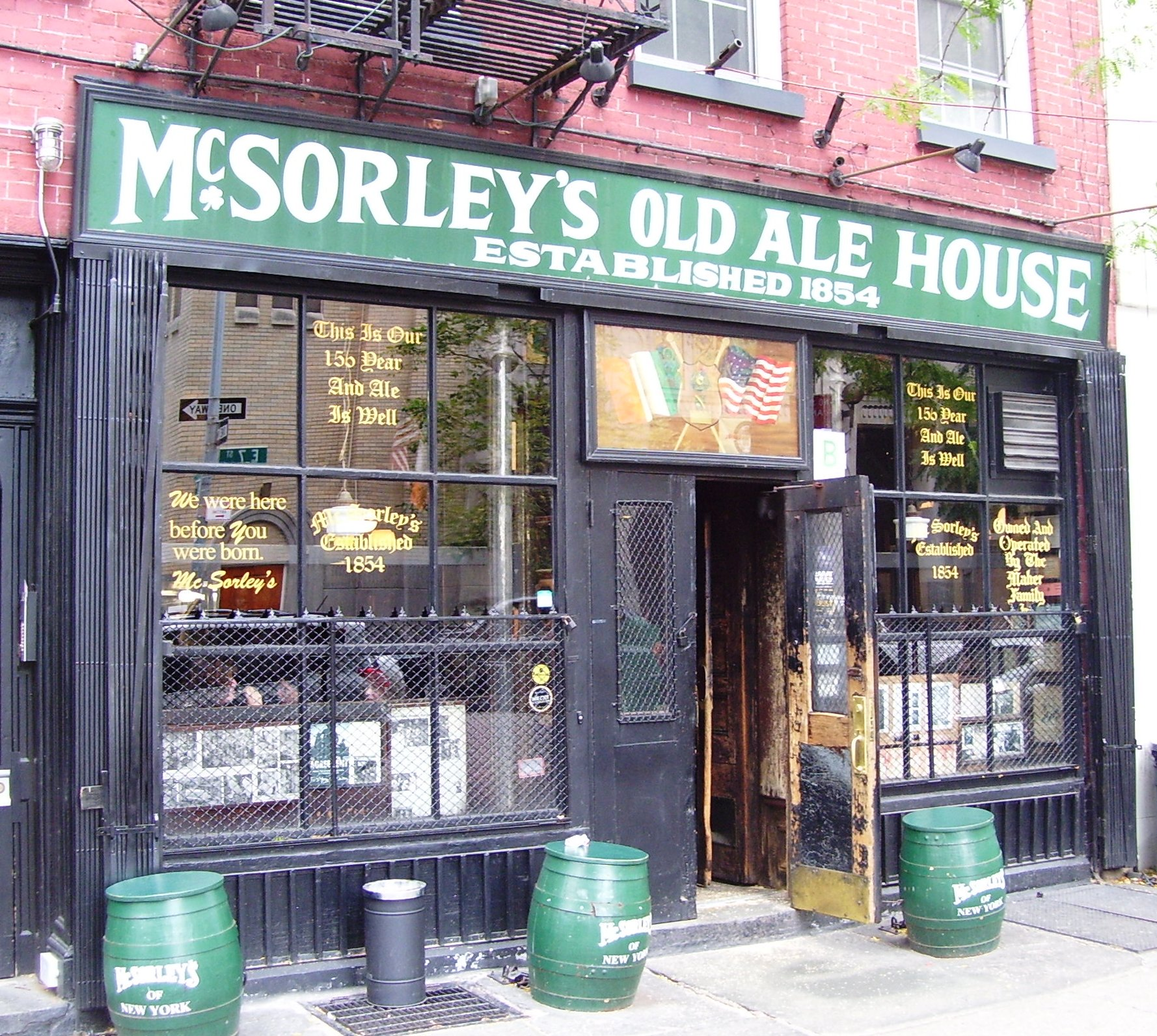
McSorley's Old Ale House is included in the district

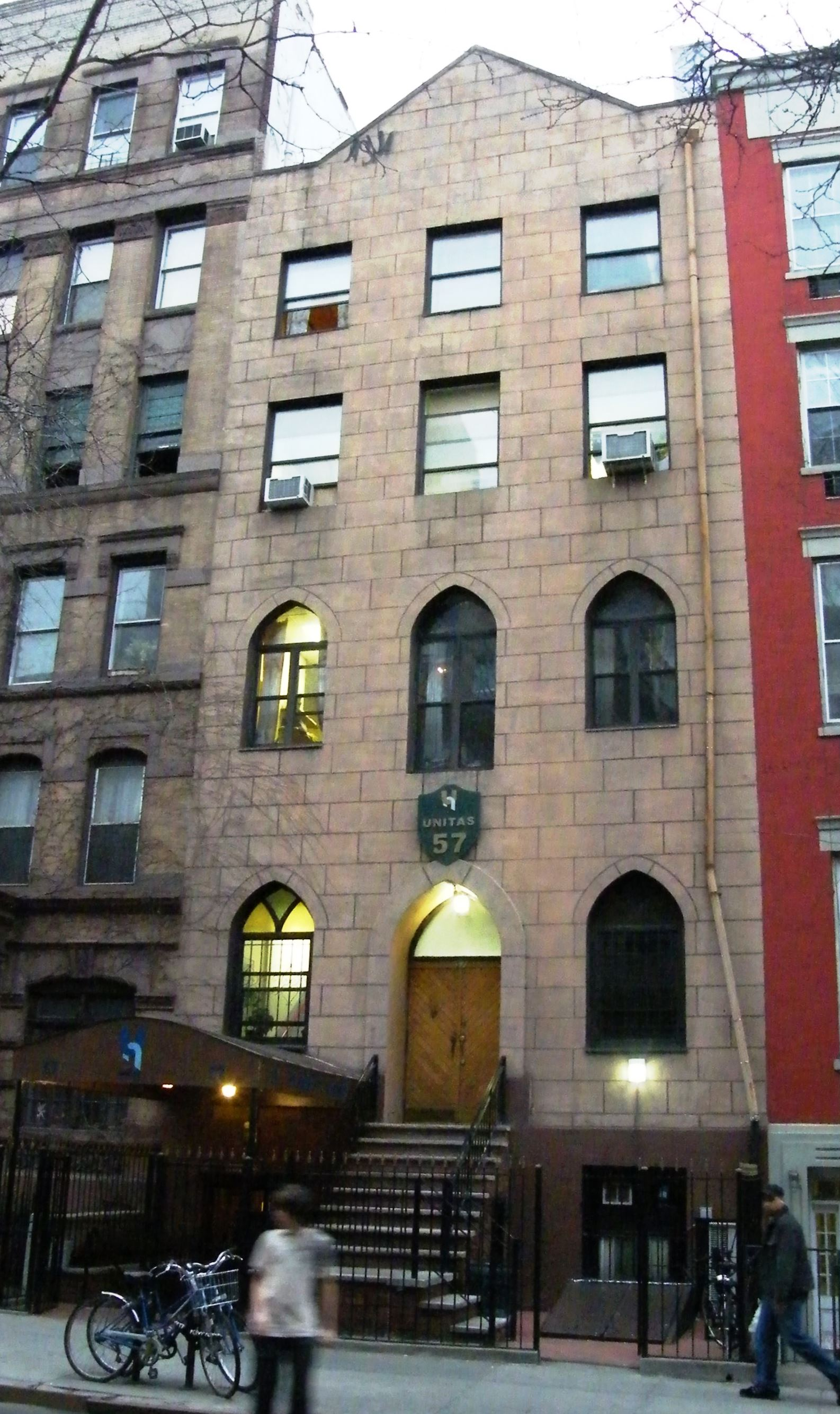
facade of Club 57

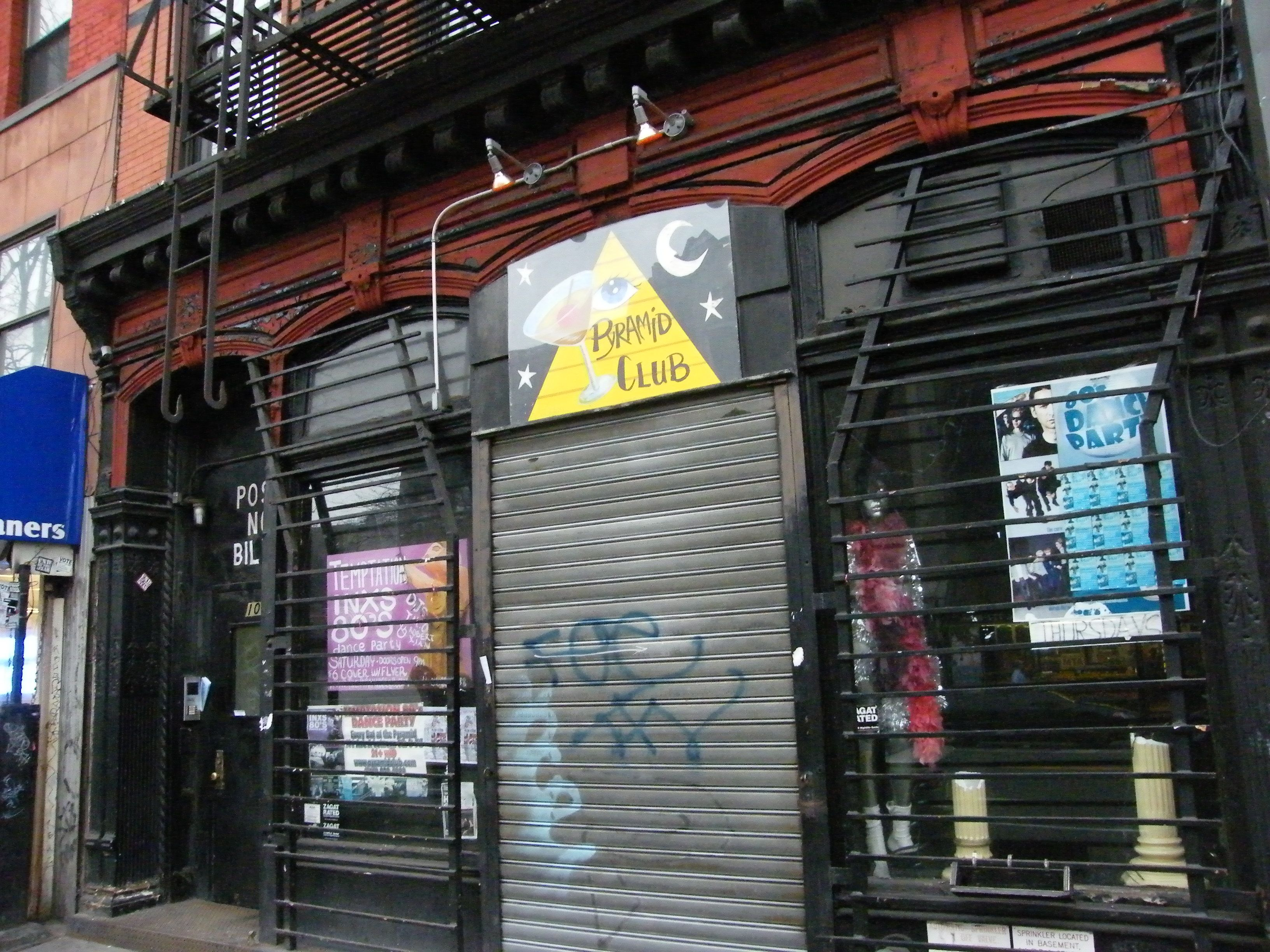
The entrance to the Pyramid Club

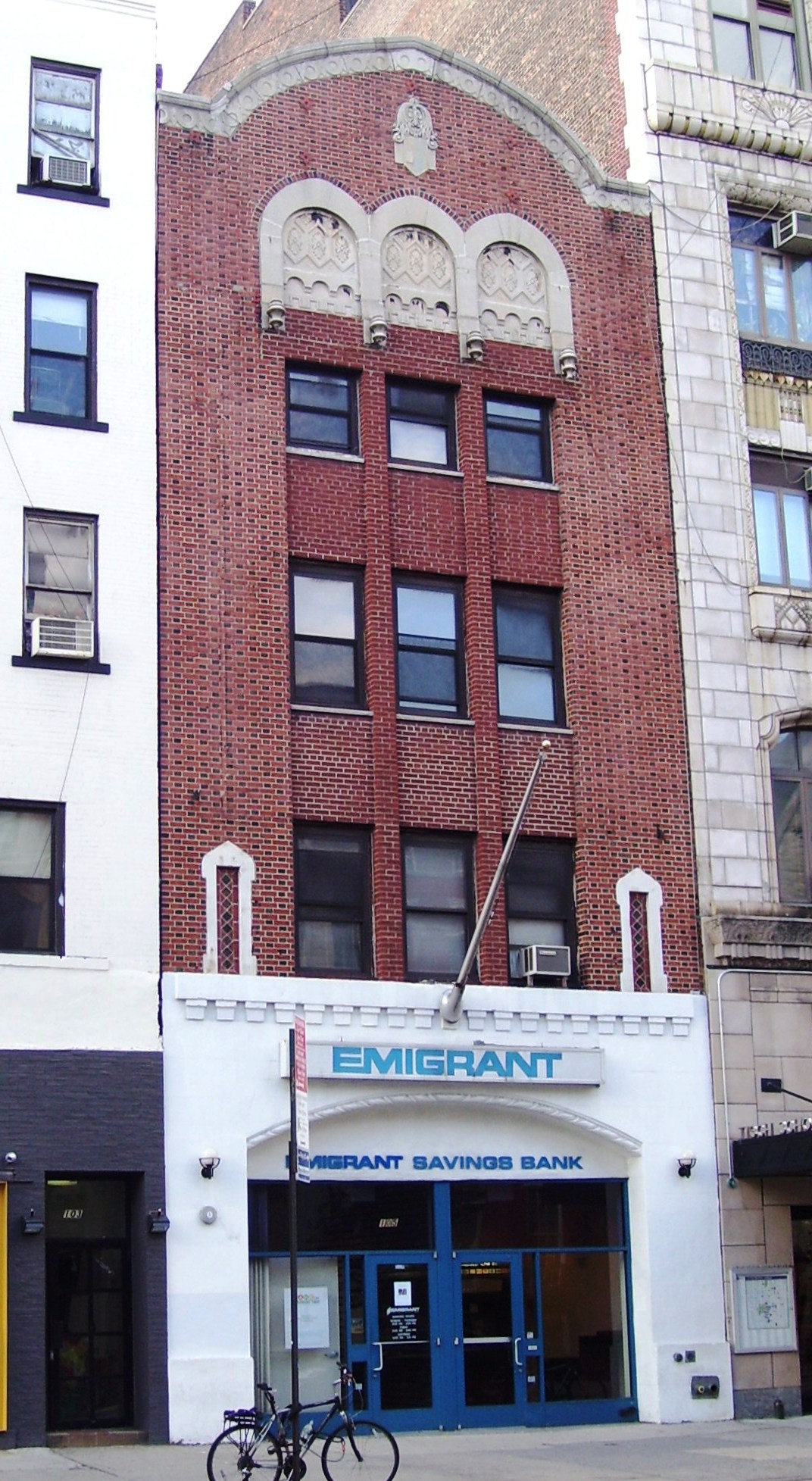
The remnant of the Filmore East at 105 Second Avenue

== See also ==
- List of New York City Designated Landmarks in Manhattan below 14th Street
- National Register of Historic Places listings in Manhattan below 14th Street
