= Eurosport Fight Club =

Television series

- Eurosport Logo
- Also known as: Fight Club
- Genre: Kickboxing; Martial Arts; MMA
- Country of origin: Europe
- Original language: English

Production
- Production locations: Issy-les-Moulineaux, Paris, France
- Editors: Samuel Pagal; Annie Vicaire; Charles-Henri Odin
- Running time: 120-180 mins. (within commercial breaks)

Original release
- Network: Eurosport
- Release: 2001

Fight Club was a martial arts TV magazine program, created by Samuel Pagal and broadcast by the French based, pan-European broadcasting sports channel Eurosport. The program includes various events, bouts and special features of kickboxing throughout the world.

Fight Club was aired on 21:00 CET on Thursdays. The replays were generally scheduled in weekends in shortened versions.

== Content ==
The Fight Club program was notable for airing K-1 events. Its whole calendar was usually shown over the course of the year. The K-1 martial arts organization had tournaments in K-1 MAX for a 70.5 kg (155 lb) weight division, and in K-1 World Grand Prix for the +90 kg (200 lb) weight division. In addition, fight club often covered various kickboxing and Muay Thai events from Europe, within modified rules in European standards.

== Featured events ==
Organization	Country	Discipline(s)	Notes
Le Choc des Titans	France	Kickboxing	
K-1	Japan	Kickboxing	
WAKO Pro World Grand Prix	Italy	Kickboxing	
United Glory	Netherlands	Kickboxing	
It's Showtime	Netherlands	Kickboxing/MMA	
Klash Events	Netherlands	Kickboxing	
King of Kings	Lithuania	Kickboxing	
SLAMM!! Events	Netherlands	Kickboxing	
Champions League	Portugal	Kickboxing	
SUPERKOMBAT	Romania	Kickboxing	
World Freefight Challenge (WFC)	Slovenia	Kickboxing/MMA	
Thailand VS Challenger Series	Thailand	Muay Thai	
Ring Masters	Turkey	Kickboxing	
King of Kings	Moldova	Kickboxing	

=== Top 10 KOs ===
The program also supplies special features like exclusive interviews with fighters and a popular Top 10 KOs list, which encloses the most spectacular knock outs made that year.

== Commentators ==
Eurosport broadcasts in 20 different languages all around Europe and in English in Asia-Pacific Zone. The commentators for each language are below:

Language	Commantator(s)	Notes
Central and West Europe
Dutch	Fred Royers	
English	Will Vanders	
French	Samuel Pagal / Charles-Henri Odin / Pascal Iglicki	
Portuguese	Carlos Ramjanali	
Eastern Europe and Balkans
Bulgarian	Kamen Petrov & Ognian Georgiev	
Czech	Ondrej Novotny & Jan Dominec	
Hungarian	Ferenc Várhegyi & Róbert Opál	
Polish	Andrzej Janisz & Piotr Zwierzchowski	
Romanian	Teo Avramescu & Alex Ganci	
Russian	Stanislav Golovanov	
Serbian	Dusko Milanovic	
Scandinavia
Danish	Tania Presutti	
Finnish	Simo Halmevuo & Petri Martinez	
Norwegian	No local commentary, broadcast in English	
Swedish	Kasra Ashami & Ronny Lindqvist	
Southern Europe
Greek	Makis Kolethras	
Italian	Dario Puppo & Stefania Bianchini	
Spanish	Emilio Marquiegui	
Turkish	Umut Isik & Birol Topuz	
Former Rosters
Italian	Giorgio Ambrogi	
Russian	Roman Mazurov	
Serbian	Ognjen Veljic	
Swedish	Jörgen Kruth	

=== Technical support ===
The program was edited in Eurosport Central Building studios which is located in Issy-Les-Moulineaux commune, Paris by Samuel Pagal, Annie Vicaire and Charle-Henri Odin, the editors of the show.

== See also ==
- Eurosport
- Sports channel
