= John Epperson =

American drag artist

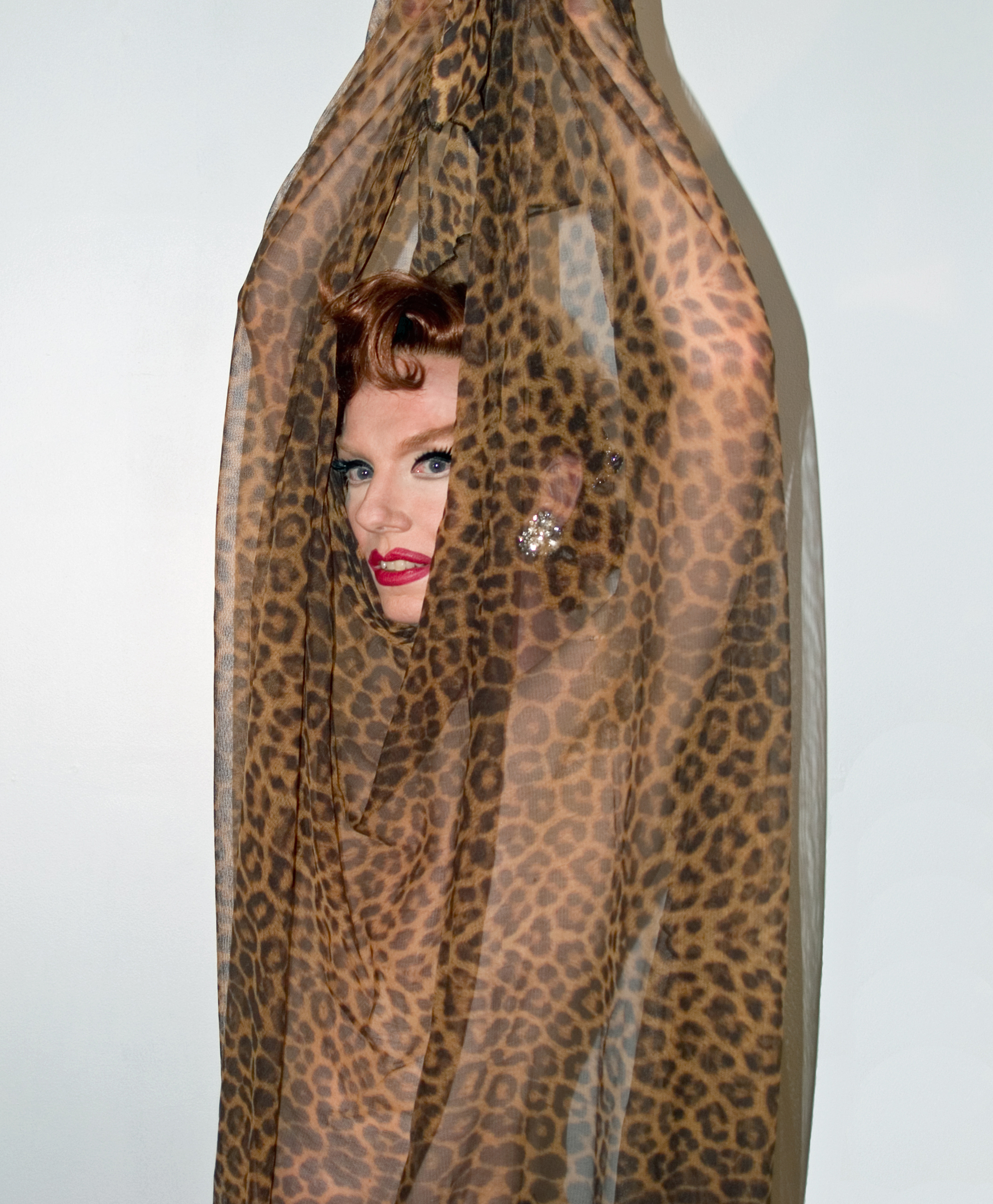
- Epperson as Lypsinka in 2007
- Born: April 24, 1955 (age 71); Hazlehurst, Mississippi, U.S.
- Other name: Lypsinka
- Education: Belhaven College
- Occupations: Drag artist, actor, pianist, vocalist, and writer

John Epperson (born April 24, 1955) is an American drag artist, actor, pianist, vocalist, and writer who is mainly known for creating his stage character Lypsinka. As Lypsinka, he lip-synchs to meticulously edited, show-length soundtracks culled from snippets of outrageous 20th-century female performances in movies and song.

== Early life ==
Epperson was born in Hazlehurst, Mississippi. He took lessons in classical piano from an early age. After high school, he enrolled at Belhaven College in Jackson, Mississippi. After graduating from Belhaven, he got a job playing piano in Colorado, but in 1978 he moved to New York City and became a full-time rehearsal pianist for the American Ballet Theatre in 1980.

He began doing drag queen performances at East Village nightspots such as Club 57 and the Pyramid Club. Epperson quit his job with the American Ballet Theatre in 1991 to perform full-time as Lypsinka. He returned to his position at American Ballet Theatre on a part-time basis.

== Work ==
Lypsinka first appeared in 1982, and for the first time Off Broadway in September 1988 when Epperson's act was a late-night addition to the bill of Charles Busch's Vampire Lesbians of Sodom at the Provincetown Playhouse in New York. She has appeared in evening-length solo shows Off-Broadway, including Lypsinka! The Boxed Set and Lypsinka! As I Lay Lip-Synching, both of which were originally produced in New York by Tweed theaterworks. However, both those named shows were first produced by Epperson in San Francisco, and Lypsinka! The Boxed Set was titled Lypsinka's Greatest Hits in San Francisco. According to Epperson, the prototype for Lypsinka was singer Dolores Gray.

Epperson was a frequent performer at Wigstock. At Studio Theatre in Washington, D.C. Epperson performed an autobiographical theatrical solo show, Show Trash (2004), out of drag, talking, playing the piano and singing in his own voice. In Winter 2004, in a different drag role, Epperson played the Wicked Stepmother in the New York City Opera's revival of Rodgers-Hammerstein's Cinderella in a cast with Eartha Kitt, Dick Van Patten and Renée Taylor.

In 1985, at The Pyramid Club, Epperson wrote the book, music and lyrics for a musical Ballet of the Dolls, a parody of the novel and film Valley of the Dolls and the ballet world. He also appeared briefly in that production as a reporter named Jonathan Susann. In 1988 Ballet of the Dolls had a second revised production at La Mama Experiment Theatre Club.

Also at The Pyramid Club in 1986 Epperson had another musical, Dial "M" For Model, for which he also wrote the book, music and lyrics. He had a larger role as a female model Mannequin St. Claire. The show was determinedly silly and presented in comic book style in its depiction of cartoonish goings-on in the fashion world of the 1960s. In 1987 "Dial 'M' For Model" moved from The Pyramid Club to La Mama Experimental Theatre Club.

In 1994, Lypsinka appeared in Witch Hunt.

Epperson played Mrs. Wilson in the movie Another Gay Movie. Epperson provided a commentary track for the 2006 Special Edition DVD release of What Ever Happened to Baby Jane?, along with Charles Busch. The second disc of the set also contains a short feature about Bette Davis and Joan Crawford, titled Blind Ambition, with contributions from Busch and Epperson.

Epperson wrote a play, My Deah, his version of the Medea tale transplanted to Mississippi which debuted at the June Havoc Theater in New York in 2006.

In 1999, Epperson appeared in a non-drag role in the critically acclaimed verbatim play Messages for Gary written by Patrick Horrigan and produced by Paul Lucas. Epperson appears in a speaking role in the 2010 film Black Swan as a rehearsal pianist for a fictional New York City ballet company.

More recently in New York in 2014 he appeared in the Off Broadway event Lypsinka! The Trilogy, a production that included three of his shows: revivals of Lypsinka! The Boxed Set and The Passion of the Crawford and John Epperson: Show Trash. The latter production is autobiographical and in it Epperson tells of growing up in Mississippi, moving to New York, working at the ballet, creating Lypsinka, etc.

In 2015 he played Queen Aggravain in the Off Broadway revival of the musical Once Upon a Mattress. In 2016 he appeared at Feinstein's/54 Below and Joe's Pub in his cabaret show John Epperson: The Artist Principally Known As Lypsinka. In early 2017 he acted a male role in a play by Wallace Shawn Evening at the Talk House. The Shawn play was produced Off-Broadway by The New Group, and included in the cast were Shawn, Matthew Broderick, Larry Pine, and Jill Eikenberry.

In 2001, he posed for a PETA ad campaign promoting vegetarianism.

== Awards ==
For his show Lypsinka! The Boxed Set Epperson won the Los Angeles Drama Critics Circle Award for Best Sound Design, the LA Weekly Theater Award for Best Solo Performance, and the Helen Hayes Award for Best Non-resident Production in 2003.

== Quotes ==
- "I don't like the term 'drag queen,' because it describes an amateur. Why not call me an actor? I suppose drag artist would be okay."
- Epperson has commented that, 'It's so easy to do misogynistic drag humor' but that he has 'deliberately tried to avoid that'. He adds that, 'A lot of women, when they see the show, felt liberated and empowered.' (...) He intends his own work as 'a commentary of performance in general and drag performance specifically.' However outrageous Lypsinka may be, she is always at heart affectionate toward the women to whose work she performs."

== See also ==
- Drag culture in New York City
- LGBTQ culture in New York City
- List of LGBTQ people in New York City
- NYC Drag March
- NYC Pride March
