= Patches (character) =

- Patches as he appears in Elden Ring, under the nom de guerre of "Patches the Untethered"
- First appearance: Armored Core: For Answer (2008)
- Last appearance: Elden Ring (2022)
- Created by: Hidetaka Miyazaki
- Voiced by: William Vanderpuye; Naomi Kusumi

Patches is a recurring character designed by Hidetaka Miyazaki and video game development studio FromSoftware. He is voiced by British actor William Vanderpuye, and, in Japanese, Naomi Kusumi. Appearing in most of their games starting from the 2008 Armored Core: For Answer, he has predominantly featured in games in the Soulsborne series, up to and including the 2022 open-world fantasy game Elden Ring. Bald and wearing trademark leather armor, he is usually a merchant who obtains his wares from looting corpses, including those of unsuspecting people he has fooled. His outlandishly cowardly personality and transparent ploys to kill the protagonist function as comic relief in the otherwise dark games. At times, Patches also becomes the player's ally, making him akin to a trickster. Patches has been described as a self-insert character for Miyazaki himself, who shares the tendency to spring traps on unsuspecting players, and only appears in games Miyazaki designed or directed. His similarity in design across games has led to theories that he can cross between dimensions. He has become widely popular amongst fans despite his constant attempts to mislead or sabotage the player.

== Character design ==
Patches is typically depicted as a middle-aged man wearing fullbody light leather armor created for thievery and sneaking, save for his head. He has little to no facial hair, small, beady eyes, and a long nose. Patches uses a spear and greatshield to fight, allowing him to attack from behind the shield in a highly defensive manner, and has a powerful kick that can break the player's guard, attributed to his preferred tactic of kicking people off cliffs. In Dark Souls III, he both uses and drops the Horsehoof Ring, a magic ring that increases the power of kicks.

Patches has a scheming, cowardly personality, preying on the player's trust by pretending to be a helpful comrade pointing the player in the right direction, before suddenly betraying them when their guard is down. If the player escapes and confronts him, Patches shamelessly denies all wrongdoing, but attempts to make amends with a token gift. Patches is nevertheless shown to have a certain moral code, not resorting to wanton murder and only going after those he believes are greedy and corrupt, generally followers of that universe's prevailing organized religion, such as the Way of White in Dark Souls and the Golden Order in Elden Ring.

Patches is commonly seen performing the "Patches Squat" or "Patches Crouch", a resting pose that resembles the Slav squat and which is learnable by the player.

== Appearances ==
A character similar to Patches appeared in the 2003 video game Shadow Tower: Abyss, in which a nameless trickster character drops players into monster-infested waters by collapsing a bridge while they are crossing it. The first incarnation of Patches himself appeared in For Answer as "Patch the Good Luck", a mecha pilot. Patch prefers to fight from afar using a sniper rifle, and will plead for mercy when defeated, retreating if the player spares his life. Patches reappears in Demon's Souls and its 2020 remake under the name "Patches the Hyena", a scavenger of corpses. He attempts to lure the player into two different deadly traps, but, if spared, will return to the game's hub area, the Nexus, to serve as a merchant. His next appearance, in Dark Souls, is as "Trusty Patches", with a nigh-identical appearance and role, springing two traps on the player in the game's Catacombs area, then returning to the game's hub, Firelink Shrine, as a merchant. In this game, he largely sells the stolen weapons, armor, and items of clerics.

Patches does not appear in Dark Souls II due to Miyazaki's lack of involvement in the game, being replaced by Mild-Mannered Pate, a similar corpse robber, but one who is less blatant in his schemes. He returns in Bloodborne as Patches the Spider, a human-headed spider creature who sells items in the game's Chalice Dungeons. During the game's main story, he gives the player the mysterious Tonsil Stone item in an attempt to trap them in an alternate dimension known as the Nightmare. In Dark Souls III, "Unbreakable Patches" steals the armor of one of the game's other characters, Siegward of Catarina. Even if killed by the player, he returns as Lapp in the game's DLC, a kindly armored knight who has lost his memory. When Lapp regains his memories, he "tricks" the player into finding the correct path.

The most recent appearance of Patches is in Elden Ring, where he ambushes the player in a cave, attempting to steal from them before cowering and begging for mercy upon his near-defeat. If Patches is befriended, he becomes a merchant and can be summoned to fight Starscourge Radahn, though he quickly flees from battle. Patches betrays the character again after joining the Recusants, a group of assassins led by the demigod Praetor Rykard. Patches "allegedly" falls in love with Rykard's consort, Lady Tanith, but is forced to leave the Recusant hideout upon Rykard's defeat. He is found heavily injured in the Shaded Castle, where he provides the player with a gift to console Tanith, albeit to no avail. While the quest ended here in older versions of the game, with Patches appearing to perish, it was later extended. Patches survives and permanently returns to his former thievery, inhabiting the same cave he is first discovered in.

In the FromSoftware game Sekiro, the character Anayama the Peddler was compared to Patches in personality and role, as a shifty former thief turned merchant.

== Development ==
In an interview, Miyazaki stated that he reused some of his favorite characters for fun, including Patches. At the time of Dark Souls, he decided that "everything" FromSoftware made in the future would contain Patches.

== Reception ==
Michael McWhertor of Polygon described Patches as a "lovable scamp" whom he never wants to go away. Calling him the "best long-running joke in FromSoftware's games", he said that Patches' "tenacity and survivability almost guarantees" that players would see him in future games. Ian Walker of Kotaku stated that Patches has a "unique brand of tomfoolery", describing his appearance in the remake of Demon's Souls as "one of the most punchable faces I've ever seen in a video game". Seth Parmer of TheGamer called him an "insufferable trickster we know and love", ranking his Dark Souls III incarnation as Unbreakable Patches and Lapp as Patches' best appearance, calling it the most despicable. He characterized Patches as "mischievous, vile", but also "oddly kind when he wants to be". Nic Reuben of PCGamesN described Patches as the "mascot" of the Souls games, calling him a "jolly, treacherous trickster" and noting the fan theory that he acts as a "deputy" for Miyazaki.

In Abyssal Archive, Lokey remarked on Patches' dislike of clergymen, whom he is shown to believe are hypocritical. Patches believes himself to be an "honest thief", making no attempt to hide his criminal behavior, while corrupt clerics would likely execute him and continue pretending to be exemplars of moral virtue. For this reason, he often appears in areas where he can trick the highly religious.
