= Michael Cavadias =

American actor, writer and DJ

- Born: February 16, 1970 (age 56); Santa Cruz, California, U.S.
- Education: New York University (BA)
- Occupation: Actor

Michael Cavadias (born February 16, 1970) is an American actor known for Wonder Boys, the 2012 TV series Girls, and Difficult People, as well as performing in theatre with the Mabou Mines and Blacklips.

== Early life and education ==
Cavadias was born in Santa Cruz, California in 1970. Cavadias graduated from the Experimental Theatre Wing at the Tisch School of the Arts and later performed with Mabou Mines.

== Career ==
Cavadias began his acting career in 1994 when he appeared in New York Undercover as Ruby. Cavadias developed the character Claywoman at Blacklips and then with Mabou Mines as a part of their resident artist program. He was also a drag performer. Cavadias is most known for his acting work in film, appearing in Wonder Boys, Gypsy 83, and Kill Your Darlings. He is a member of the Democratic Socialists of America.

== Filmography ==
=== Film ===
Year	Title	Role	Notes
1998	The Electric Urn	Lula	
2000	Wonder Boys	Miss Sloviak	
2001	Gypsy 83	Hazleton	
2003	Nola	Wendy	
2004	Marmalade	Marmalade	
2005	All I Want: A Portrait of Rufus Wainwright	—N/a	
2009	He Likes Guys	Jerome	
2012	Becoming Blond	Stone	
2013	Kill Your Darlings	Ray Conklin	
2016	All We Had	Doctor	

=== Television ===
Year	Title	Role	Notes
1994	New York Undercover	Ruby	Episode: "Blondes Have More Fun"
2000	Third Watch	Lady #2	Episode: "32 Bullets and a Broken Heart"
2014	Girls	Kelvin	Episode: "Females Only"
2015, 2017	Difficult People	Linus	2 episodes
2018	Strangers	Juaquim	Episode: "The Big (Gr)apple"
