= John Jesurun =

American theatre director

- Born: Battle Creek, Michigan U.S.
- Known for: Theatre

John Jesurun is a writer, director and multi-media artist, based in New York City. His work Chang in a Void Moon is a live serial running since 1983, originally at the Pyramid Club in the East Village and now less frequently at venues worldwide. He was born 1951 in Battle Creek, Michigan.

== Education ==
Jesurun received his B.F.A. from the Philadelphia College of Art in 1972 and his M.F.A. in Sculpture from Yale University in 1974.

== Career ==
From 1976 to 1979, Jesurun was a television content analyst for CBS. From 1979 to 1982, he was assistant producer of the Dick Cavett Show. In 1982 he began his theatrical career at the Pyramid Club with his serial drama/comedy/mystery play Chang in a Void Moon. The story revolves around the exploits of Chang, a businessman with diplomatic immunity and his many exploits. Jesurun received a Bessie Award for Chang in a Void Moon in 1985. La MaMa Experimental Theatre Club has presented episodes of Chang in a Void Moon in 1995, 1997, 2003, 2004 and 2021.

Since 1982 he has written, directed and designed over 25 pieces.

=== Works ===
Year	Title
1982–83	Chang in a Void Moon episodes #1-36; Bird's Eye View; Non Chang pieces
1984	Dog's Eye View; Number Minus One; Red House; Chang in a Void Moon, episodes #37-42
1985	Shatterhand Massacree
1986	Deep Sleep; White Water
1987	Black Maria
1988	Chang in a Void Moon, episodes #43-45
1989	Sunspot
1990	Everything that Rises Must Converge
1991	Blue Heat
1992	Iron Lung
1993	Southern Cross; Point of Debarkation
1994	Slight Return; Pearly Iridescent; Joan D’Ark
1995	Chang in a Void Moon, episodes #46-50
1996	Faust/How I Rose
1997	After Image; Chang in a Void Moon, episodes #51-53 at The Kitchen
1999	Land of the Living
2000	Snow
2003	Bardo; Chang in a Void Moon, episodes #54-56 at La MaMa
2004	Chang in a Void Moon, episode #57 at La MaMa; Chang in a Void Moon, episode #58 at Berliner Festspiele
2005	Septet, part 1 Stoned Love; Chang in a Void Moon, episode #56
2006	Septet, part 2 Firefall
2009	Liz One (Her Secret Diaries in the Land of 1,000 Dances)
2014	Chang in a Void Moon, episodes 59–61 at Incubator Arts Project

== Style ==
Jesurun's presentations integrate elements of language, film, architectural space and media. His exploded narratives cover a wide range of themes and explore the relation of form to content, challenging the experience of verbal, visual and intangible perceptions. His work features integrated creation of the text, direction, set and media design. Describing his process, Jesurun explains, "Usually everything happens at the same time. I write with a typewriter on one side and a sketchbook on the other side. So then the words and images and ideas happen simultaneously."

== Touring ==
Jesurun's company has toured extensively in Europe and the United States. His work has been produced and presented by numerous venues including La Mama, The Kitchen, Dance Theater Workshop, the Walker Arts Center, On the Boards, Brooklyn Academy of Music, the Wexner Center, Kampnagel Theater, Prater Theater, National Theatre of Mexico, Mickery Theater, Theater am Turm, Granada Festival, Eurokaz Zagreb, Bogota International Festival, Vienna Festival, Kyoto Performing Arts Center and Spoleto USA. His short films have been shown at festivals and alternative spaces in Europe and the US.

== Teaching ==
Jesurun has taught theater at Goethe University, Frankfurt; Justus Liebig University, Giessen; DasArts, Amsterdam; New York University; La Mama, Umbria; Tokyo University; Kyoto University of Art and Design; and The New School.
