= Elegies for Angels, Punks and Raging Queens =

Elegies For Angels, Punks and Raging Queens
- Music: Janet Hood
- Lyrics: Bill Russell
- Book: Bill Russell
- Basis: Inspired by the NAMES Project AIDS Memorial Quilt and Edgar Lee Masters' Spoon River Anthology
- Productions: 1989 Off-Off Broadway; 1993 West End; 2001 New York City Concert; 2014 New York City; 2015 West End; 2019 Off West End

Elegies For Angels, Punks and Raging Queens is a musical with music by Janet Hood and lyrics and book by Bill Russell. The work features songs and monologues inspired by the NAMES Project AIDS Memorial Quilt and Edgar Lee Masters' Spoon River Anthology. Each of the monologues is written from the perspective of characters who've died from AIDS and the songs represent the feelings of friends and family members dealing with the loss.

The piece was developed in the late 1980s and was originally titled "The Quilt." It was originally produced in 1989 by the TWEED New Works Festival at the Ohio Theatre in Soho in NYC, where the new title was adopted. It was subsequently produced off-off Broadway in 1990 by TWEED's artistic director Kevin Malony and Justin Ross at RAPP Arts Center in Manhattan's East Village. In 1992, it was produced by Giacomo Capizzano at the King's Head Theatre in London, where it played for several months. In June 1993, the production was transferred by Mr Capizzano to the Criterion Theatre in London's West End, where it played until July of the same year. The London cast included Miquel Brown, Kim Criswell, Kwame Kwei-Armah, James Dreyfus, Simon Fanshawe and legendary drag queen Regina Fong.

In addition to the New York and London productions of the piece, there have been professional productions in Australia, Germany and Israel, among other countries.

== Subsequent production history ==
=== 2001 New York ===
"Elegies" was again performed in New York City on April 2, 2001 in the Haft Theatre at the Fashion Institute of Technology as a benefit for the Momentum AIDS Project. The cast for that performance included numerous well known performers including Alice Ripley, Emily Skinner, Brian d'Arcy James, Christopher Durang, Mario Cantone, Joe Piscopo and Norm Lewis. The concert was recorded, and the recording was released by Fynsworth Alley in 2001.

=== 2004 Minneapolis ===
On November 3, 2004, Minneapolis Musical Theater, directed by Steven Meerdink and Kevin Hansen, premiered a One-Night-Only Benefit Performance of "Elegies" in collaboration with the Minnesota AIDS Project. The cast in included Prudence Johnson, Mary Jane Alm, Dennis Spears, Christopher Hopkins, Esera Tuaolo, and Cookie Coleman among others with special guest appearance by Bill Russell.

=== 2008 London ===
On December 1, 2008, there was a West End Gala performance of the show at Soho Revue Bar, produced by Oliver Wood and directed by Simon Pollard. The cast included Anna Chancellor, David Bedella, Leanne Jones, Les Dennis, Adele Anderson and Debbie Chazen. All proceeds from the performance went to the UK charity Terence Higgins Trust.

=== 2010 Ireland ===
In Ireland, the premiere production in Northern Ireland was on 30 August 2010 at The Black Box in Belfast. The production featured a cast of 35 actors and singers, including a special video appearance by Graham Norton. A cast recording was released on 14 December 2010. All profits from the production and the recording were donated to the Rainbow Project. The premiere production in the Republic of Ireland was in September 2010 and was produced by Limerick's Bottom Dog Theatre Company.

=== 2013 University of Kansas ===
Elegies for Angels, Punks and Raging Queens was revised and performed at the University of Kansas in early 2013, directed by Bill Russell, musical direction by Janet Hood.

=== 2014 New York ===
The performance piece was again produced in New York City by Marymount Manhattan College in January 2014. With a cast consisting of over 40 current students, recent alumni, and distinguished faculty, and helmed by Tony Award-nominated book writer and lyricist Bill Russell and music director Paul Jacobs (composer), the musical played 4 total performances (1 preview and 3 regular performances) at the National Dance Institute in Harlem. This production marked the first time that the show was used as an educational course for students. After auditions were held and the piece was cast, it was announced that students would be able to earn credit towards their degrees provided they followed the course outline in the syllabus, which included daily reflections in the form of journals, analysis of poetry from Edgar Lee Masters' Spoon River Anthology, extensive research on differing topics pertaining to HIV/AIDS, and a small, formal writing assignment at the end of the production process.

=== 2015 West End ===
The show returned to the Criterion Theatre in London's West End on Sunday 31 May 2015 to raise money for the MAD Trust, with a cast including Emma Hatton, Fra Fee, Emma Williams, Michael McKell and Madalena Alberto. It was Directed by Stephen Whitson with Choreography by Ewan Jones and Musical Direction by Dean Austin. Bill Russell was in attendance and made an appearance on stage during the curtain call.

=== 2019 London ===
"Elegies" ran at the Union Theatre, Southwark in an amateur Off-West End production until June 8, 2019. Produced by Sasha Regan and Directed by Bryan Hodgson. The cast includes Fraser Leigh Green, Michiel Janssens, Marcus Ayton, Calum Gulvin, Aidan Harkins, Chris Cahill, Althea Burey, Jackie Pulford, Jade Marvin, Charlie McCullagh, Ailsa Davidson, Jade Chaston, Paige Fenlon, Kristine Kruse, Matthew Grove

== Songs from the show ==
1. Angels, Punks And Raging Queens
2. I'm Holding On To You
3. And The Rain Keeps Falling Down
4. I Don't Do That Anymore
5. I Don't Know How To Help You
6. Celebrate
7. Heroes All Around [*]
8. Spend It While You Can
9. My Brother Lived In San Francisco
10. Learning To Let Go

[*] The 2013 University of Kansas revision does not include "Heroes All Around."
