= Blacklips =

American avant-garde drag theater troupe

The Blacklips Performance Cult was an avant-garde drag theater troupe based in New York City's Lower East Side, at the Pyramid Club. The troupe was active from summer 1992 to spring 1995.

The troupe was founded in the summer of 1992 by Anohni with Johanna Constantine and Psychotic Eve. In a short time, the troupe had grown to consist of 15 downtown artists.

The troupe started doing shows in the Crow Bar but soon moved to the Pyramid Club where it would set up different plays each Monday night. The first play was The Scarlet Letter adapted by Anohni, shown once on 12 October 1992. The last play was 13 Ways to Die, which was shown on 13 March 1995. Anohni directed two plays, The Birth of Anne Frank and Miracle Now, which were performed with many of the Blacklips members at PS122.

The troupe quickly became famous in the underground club culture of the Lower East Side. In one of the plays, called Starvation, the dancers dressed as maggots and threw liver.

It was in the Blacklips Performance Cult that Anohni first gained attention thanks to her extraordinary voice. During performances she sang "Cripple and the Starfish", "Blue Angel", "Rapture", and "Hitler in My Heart". These songs were later published on her first album as part of Antony and the Johnsons.

In 2023, Anohni and Marti Wilkerson published Blacklips: Her Life and Her Many, Many Deaths, an art book documenting the troupe's career.

== List of troupemembers ==
- Anohni (sometimes credited as Fiona Blue)
- Johanna Constantine
- Psychotic Eve (Scott Jackson)
- Hattie Hathaway
- James F. Murphy
- Sissy Fit
- Lily of the Valley (Michael Cavadias)
- Kabuki Starshine
- Page
- Flloyd
- Lost Forever
- Lulu
- Pearls
- Mouse (Mercedes Bahleda)
- Howie Pyro
- Clark Render
- Ebony Jet
- Herr Klunch
- Holly Fur
