= Meserich Synagogue =

Orthodox synagogue in Manhattan, New York

Coordinates: 40°43′34″N 73°59′7″W

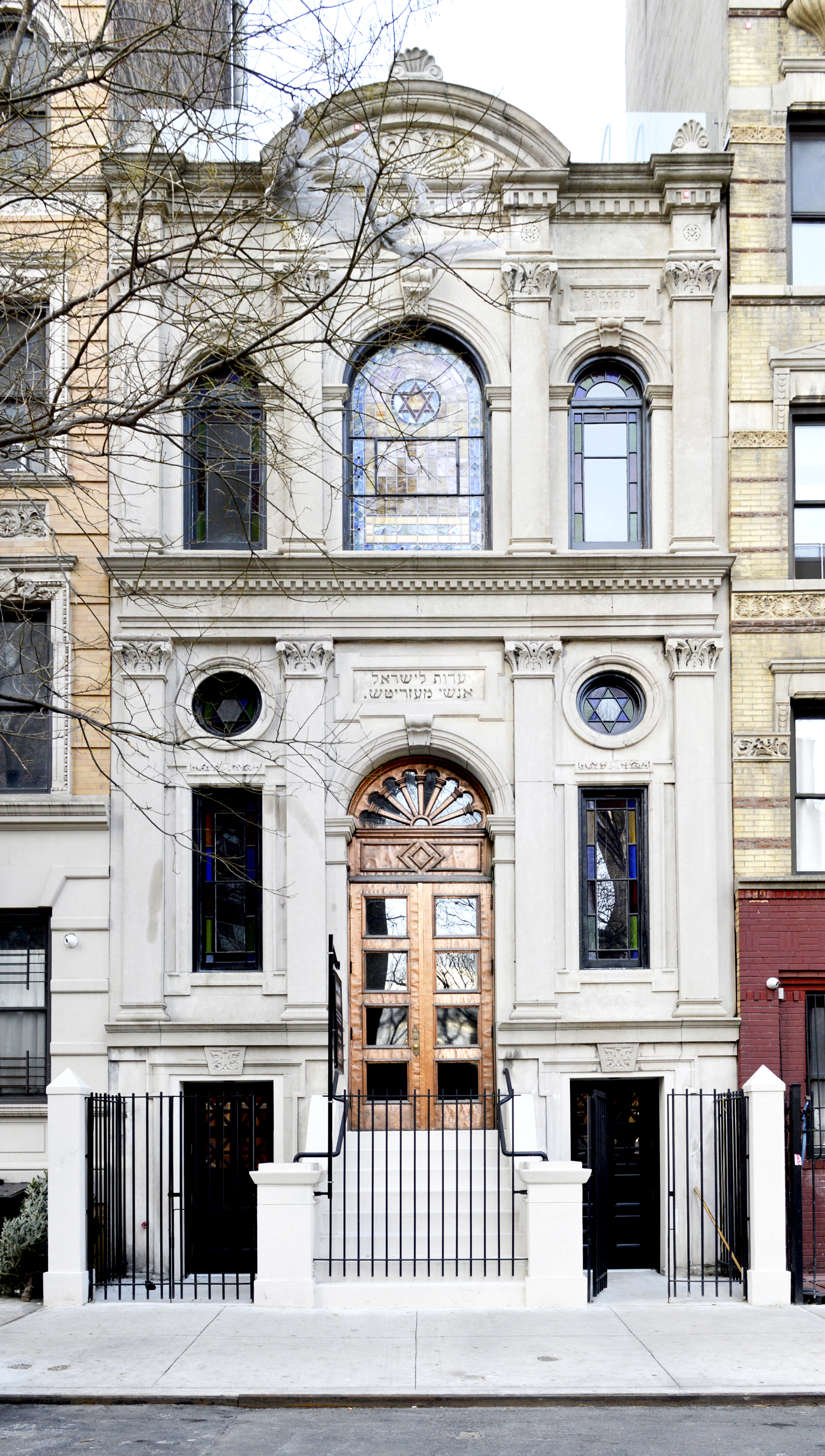
- Meserich Synagogue restored façade in 2017

- Location in Lower Manhattan

Religion
- Affiliation: Orthodox Judaism
- Ecclesiastical or organizational status: Synagogue
- Status: Active

Location
- Location: 415 East 6th Street, East Village, Manhattan, New York City, New York
- Country: United States
- Interactive map of Meserich Synagogue

Architecture
- Architect: Herman Horenburger (1910)
- Type: Residence; later as a synagogue
- Style: Neo-classical
- Established: 1888 (as a congregation)
- Completed: 1841 (as a residence); 1910 (as a synagogue)
- Construction cost: $15,000 (1910)

Specifications
- Direction of façade: South
- Materials: Stone

Meserich Synagogue, Meserich Shul or Meseritz Shul, also known as Edes Israel Anshei Mesrich, Edath Lei'Isroel Ansche Meseritz or Adas Yisroel Anshe Mezeritz ("Community of Israel, People of Mezertiz"), is an Orthodox Jewish synagogue located at 415 East 6th Street, in the East Village of Manhattan, New York City, New York, United States.

The congregation was established in 1888, comprising immigrants from Międzyrzec Podlaski, a city in Biała County, Lublin Voivodeship, Poland, known as a center of Jewish learning. The synagogue building was designed by Herman Horenburger in the Neo-Classical style, was completed in 1910, and is located between Avenue A and First Avenue.

Pesach (Paul) Ackerman served as Rabbi from 1969 until his death on June 14, 2013.

== Jewish life in Międzyrzec ==
Międzyrzec was home to a large Jewish community from the 16th century. At the end of the 1930s in the reborn Polish Republic approximately 12,000 inhabitants, or 75% of its population, were Jewish.

== Architecture ==
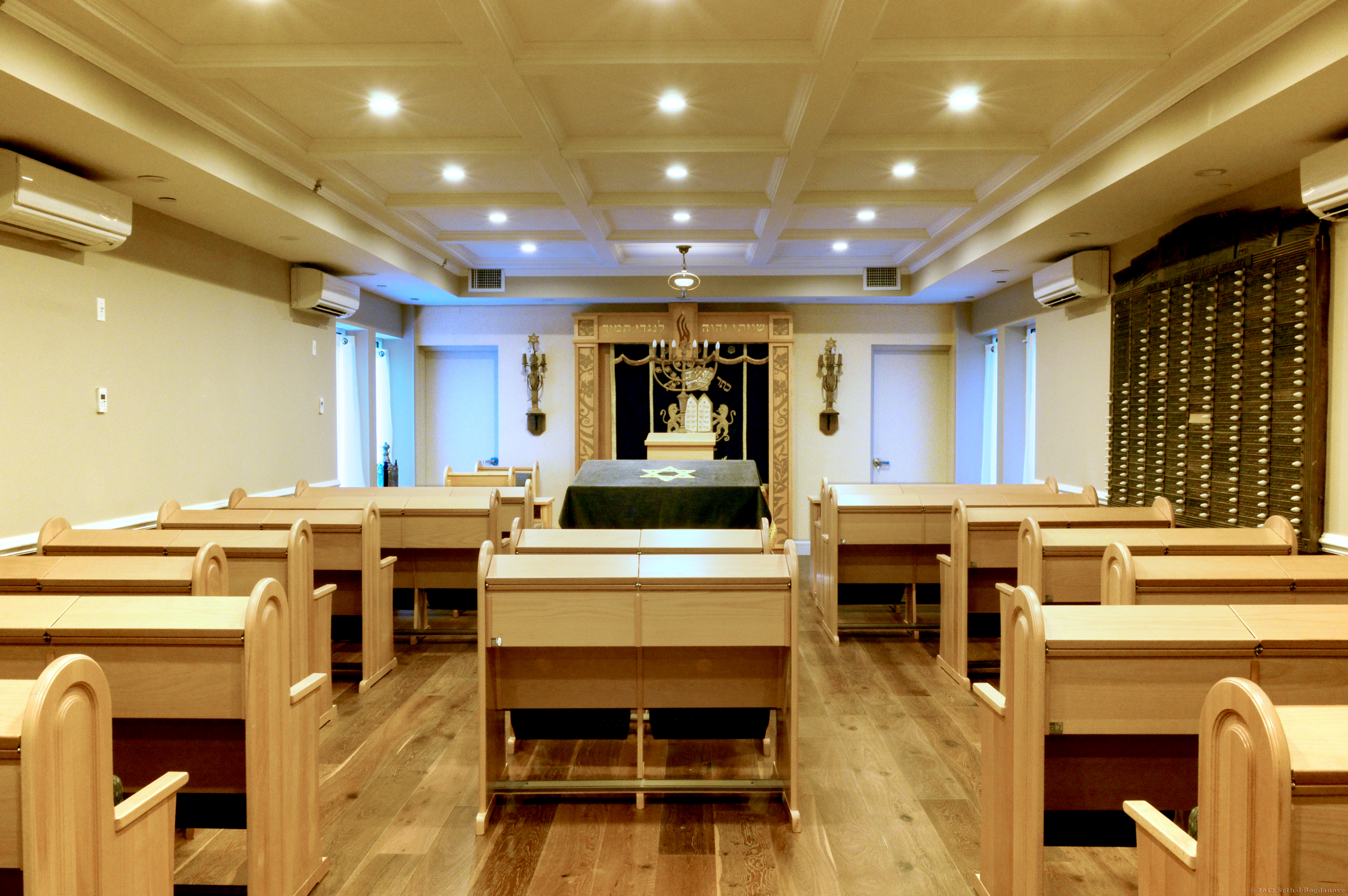
Meserich Synagogue restored sanctuary in 2017

The congregation, founded in 1888, originally worshiped in a building on Clinton Street. The building which now houses the synagogue was originally built in 1841 as a 2 1/2-story house for J. B. Murray. Herman Horenburger designed the conversion into a synagogue in 1910. It is similar in style to Congregation Kolbuszower Teitelbaum Cheva Banai at 622 East 5th Street, which was also built in 1910; both have sunburst pediments.

The synagogue is unusual in being a very small, urban congregation on a narrow lot that has an extremely beautiful Neo-Classical facade, and is the last operating "tenement synagogue" in the East Village. Andrew Berman of the Greenwich Village Society for Historic Preservation called it "an intact historic gem."

Architectural historian and New York University professor Gerald R. Wolfe describes the synagogue's "most attractive interior... The unusually narrow building has balconies which extend almost to the middle of the sanctuary, and through the intervening space, broad rays of light from two overhead skylights seem to focus on the Ark and on a large stained glass panel above it. The soft-yellow-colored panes of the two-story-high window are crowned by an enormous Mogen David [Star of David] of red glass which seems to dominate the entire room."

Andrew Dolkart, a Columbia University professor of historic preservation, believes that the building should be preserved, because cities should preserve "architecture that not only reflects the lives and history of the rich, but also the incredibly history of common people in New York."

== Re-development ==
After experiencing dwindling attendance and facing financial difficulties due to the ongoing maintenance of the synagogue building, the congregation began negotiations with Joshua Kushner, part of the family that owns the New York Observer newspaper. Kushner planned to tear down the present synagogue and build a six-story residential building, housing the synagogue in a modern space on the lowest two floors. According to historic preservationist Samuel D. Gruber, there was a feasible, yet more costly, alternative which would preserve the synagogue building and construct apartments above it. A coalition of neighborhood groups including the Greenwich Village Society for Historic Preservation, the East Village Community Coalition, and Jewish groups have rallied to save the building and have asked the New York City Landmarks Preservation Commission to landmark the building.

The Kushners later withdrew from the development deal. In October 2012, the Landmarks Preservation Commission created the East Village/Lower East Side Historic District, which included in its boundaries the Meserich Synagogue. In 2013, the congregation entered into a $1.2 million 99-year lease with East River Partners to build apartments on the upper stories of its building. The synagogue temporarily relocated during the development and reopened in March 2017 with a ceiling put at balcony level above the restored sanctuary to separate it from the luxury apartments that were built. The building façade was restored.
