= John Kelly (performance artist) =

American performance artist (born 1959)

- Born: 1959; United States
- Writing career
- Language: English
- Genre: Theatre

John Kelly (born 1959) is an American performance artist, visual artist and writer.

His work first gained notoriety in the 1980s East Village art scene, and in the last 40 years Kelly has received two Bessie Awards, two Obie Awards, two NEA American Masterpiece Awards, an American Choreographer Award, a Herb Alpert Award in the Arts (CalArts), a Visual AIDS Vanguard Award, and an Ethyl Eichelberger Award. His work has been presented at Lincoln Center and Brooklyn Academy of Music.

He is a MacDowell Colony fellow.

Kelly was diagnosed as HIV+ in 1989. He has been on medications since 1996, and has remained completely asymptomatic.

== Career ==
John Kelly began his performance career in New York's Lower East Side in the 1980s at clubs such as the Mudd Club, Limbo Lounge, Pyramid Club, and Club 57. Since then, his works have been performed at The Kitchen, La MaMa, PS 122, New York Live Arts, the Joyce Theater, Dance Theater Workshop, Danspace Project, Museum of Modern Art, Tate Modern, Whitney Museum of American Art, The Andy Warhol Museum, PS 1, Walker Art Center. Commissions include BAM’s Next Wave Festival, Lincoln Center, and MASS MoCA.

The book John Kelly: a Visual Autobiography was published by 2wice Arts Foundation in association with Aperture.

Kelly is described as a countertenor singer, whose vocal range extends from a male alto (that he mostly sings in) to a much lower baritone.

According to Elisabeth Vincentelli (in The New York Times), "If the protean Mr. Kelly has had one recurring theme through the years, it is the shaping of the self through art. In his new show at La MaMa, “Time No Line,” the subject is himself — but then, hasn’t it always been, even when refracted through the creations of others?"

Kelly's work is notable for a number of performances where he channeled Joni Mitchell. In several works, Kelly performed an entire concert piece as Mitchell. The two artists met in 1996.

== Performance works ==
- ‘Go West Junger Mann’ (1985)
- ‘John Kelly Sings’ (1985)
- ‘Long Live The Knife’ (1985)
- ‘Diary Of A Somnambulist’ (1985/86)
- ‘Born With The Moon In Cancer’ (1986)
- ‘Pass The Blutwurst, Bitte’ (1986)
- ‘Ode To A Cube’ (1988)
- ‘Find My Way Home’ (1988)
- ‘Love Of A Poet’ (1990)
- ‘The Dagmar Onassis Story’ (1990)
- ‘Cupid And Death’ (1990)
- ‘Maybe It’s Cold Outside’ (1990)
- ‘Down In The Mouth’ (1991)
- ‘Her Tender Moment’ (1991)
- ‘Akin: True But Dour’ (1992)
- ‘Arias I Love’ (1992)
- ‘Divine Promiscue’ (1992)
- ‘Light Shall Lift Them’ (1993)
- ‘I Want Your Myth’ (1993)
- ‘Far Cry From Bliss’ (1994)
- ‘Constant Stranger’ (1995)
- ‘Pass The Blutwurst, Bitte’ (1995)
- ’20th Century Vox’ (1996)
- ‘Paved Paradise’ (1997)
- ‘Sing Low Sweet Love’ (1998)
- ‘Life Of Cruelty’ (1998)
- ‘Find My Way Home (1998)
- ‘Moondrunk’ (1999)
- ‘Café Bluebeard Hof’ (1999)
- ‘Brother’ (2001)
- ‘The Paradise Project’ (2002)
- ‘Shiny Hot Nights’ (2002/05)
- ‘Get Up And Jive’ (2003)
- ‘The Skin I’m In’ (2004)
- ‘Mrs. Hamlet’ (2006)
- ‘21st Century Vox’ (2006)
- ‘Cara Viaggio’ (2007)
- ‘Music For Romanians’ (2007)
- ‘Songs For A Shiny Hot Night: Joni Mitchell’s Court And Spark’ (2008)
- ‘Dargelos at Bar 13’ (2008)
- ‘Paved Paradise Redux’ (2009/10)
- ‘Cohesion’ (2010)
- ‘Pass The Blutwurst, Bitte (2010)
- ‘The Escape Artist’ (2011)
- ‘Find My Way Home’ (2011)
- ‘Muse Ascending A Staircase’ (2012)
- ‘John Kelly & Dargelos’ (2012)
- ‘Rebel Songs of A Range Queen’ (2013)
- ‘Caravaggio Songs: Music From The Escape Artist’ (2013)
- ‘Escape Artist Redux’ (2014)
- ‘Love of a Poet’ (2015)
- ‘Beauty Kills Me’ (2016)
- ‘DOWN TO YOU: John Kelly Sings Joni Mitchell’ (2017)
- ‘Time No Line’ (2017)

== Awards and honors ==
- 1986 Bessie Award
- 1987 Obie Award
- 1987 American Choreographer Award
- 1988 Bessie Award
- 1989 John Simon Guggenheim Foundation Fellowship
- 1991 Obie Award
- 2001 Cal/Arts Alpert Award, in Dance/Performance
- 2006-07 Rome Prize in Visual Art, American Academy In Rome
- 2010 Visual AIDS Vanguard Award
- 2010 Ethyl Eichelberger Award
- 2010 NEA American Masterpieces Award, for ‘Pass The Blutwurst, Bitte‘
- 2011 NEA American Masterpieces Award, for ‘Find My Way Home’
- 2012 GLAAD Media Award for Outstanding New York Theater: Off-Off Broadway ‘The Escape Artist’, book by John Kelly, songs by John Kelly & Carol Lipnik
- 2017 National Endowment for the Arts, Grant, for ‘Time No Line’
