= Pyramid Club (New York City) =

Nightclub in Manhattan, New York

- Pyramid Cocktail Lounge
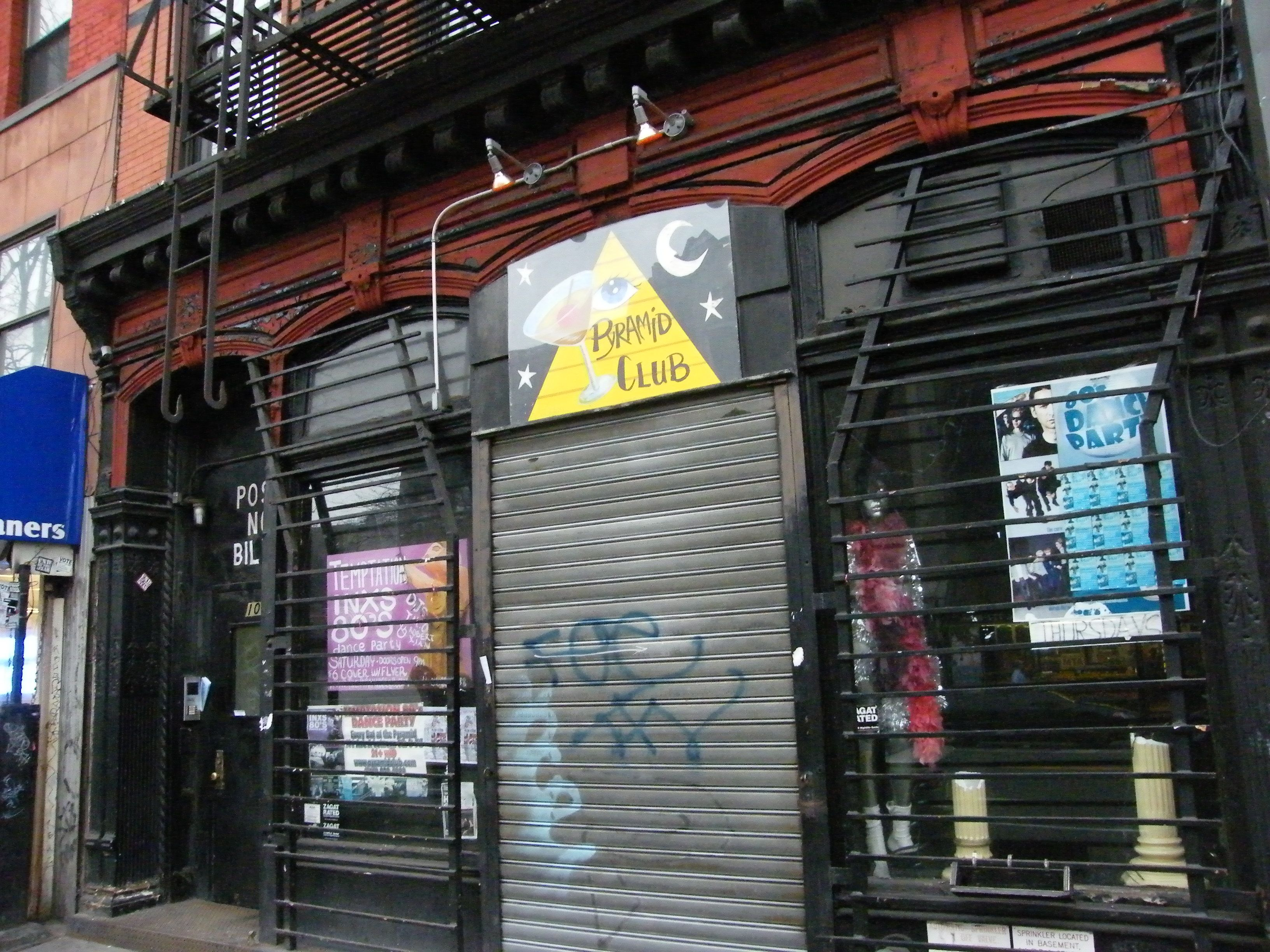
- Entrance to the club in 2009
- Interactive map of Pyramid Club
- Address: 101 Avenue A
- Location: New York City
- Coordinates: 40°43′33″N 73°59′02″W
- Type: Nightclub

Construction
- Opened: 1979
- Closed: 2020

The Pyramid Club was a nightclub at 101 Avenue A in the East Village of Manhattan in New York City. After opening in 1979, the Pyramid helped define the East Village drag queen, gay, post-punk and no wave art and music scenes of the 1980s.

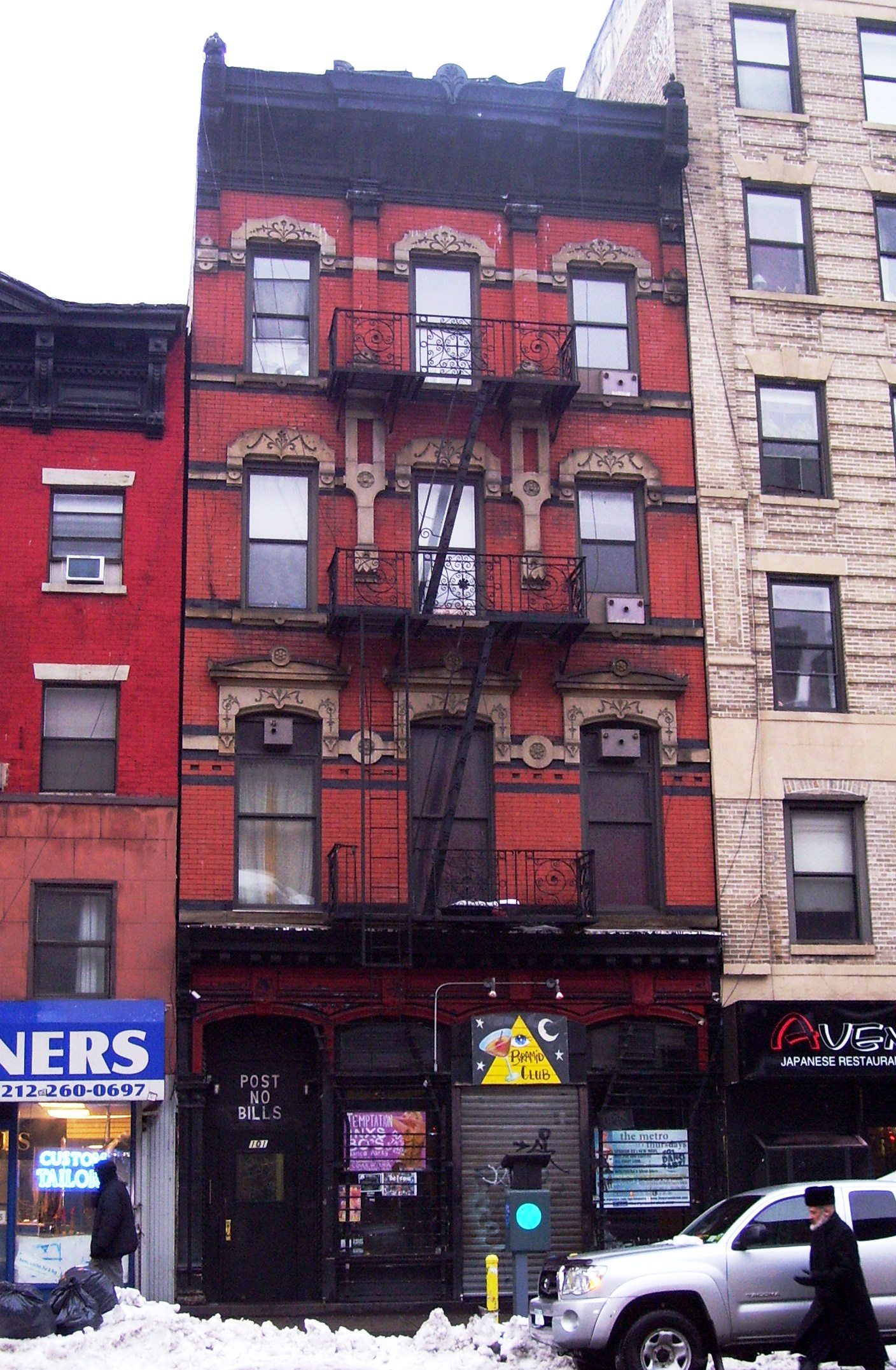
101 Avenue A, the 1876 building which housed the club

== History ==
In the 1970s and 1980s, the club became a hangout for "a new breed of politicized drag performers" like Lypsinka, Lady Bunny, and RuPaul, whose first New York City show was at the Pyramid Club in 1982.

On Labor Day 1985, Pyramid performer Lady Bunny hosted the Wigstock Festival in Tompkins Square Park. Andy Warhol and Debbie Harry dropped in the Pyramid to do a feature on the club for MTV, and Madonna appeared at her first AIDS benefit at the club. Both Nirvana and Red Hot Chili Peppers played their first New York City concerts there. Both Live Skull and Sonic Youth played there in 1983 and 1984. They Might Be Giants was considered the house band for some time.

From 1992–1995, Blacklips Performance Cult, a collective founded by ANOHNI, presented plays at Pyramid every Monday at midnight. Many visual artists, such as Keith Haring, Jean-Michel Basquiat, and Jack Smith were frequent patrons of the club. Performance artists John Kelly, Ann Magnuson, Steve Buscemi and Eric Bogosian performed there and John Jesurun began his drama/comedy/mystery serial play Chang in a Void Moon at the Pyramid in 1982 and received a Bessie Award for it in 1985. Drag performances at Pyramid Club also played a key role in inspiring Japanese drag queen Simone Fukayuki to start Diamonds Are Forever in 1989 (originally based in Osaka, now in Kyoto), today Japan's oldest and longest-running drag show.

In 2007, it was proposed that 101 Avenue A, the Pyramid Club's building, be landmarked. The proposal, described as the first drag landmark, was not adopted by the New York City Landmarks Preservation Commission (LPC). However, in the spring of 2011 the LPC proposed a new historic district in the East Village focused around lower Second Avenue and encompassing 15 blocks and 330 buildings. The original proposal excluded buildings such as the Pyramid Club, but because of efforts made by local community groups, the proposed district was expanded to 101 Avenue A as well as other similar buildings. The LPC designated the club as part of the East Village/Lower East Side Historic District on October 9, 2012.

The club shut during the COVID-19 pandemic in 2020. It unsuccessfully reopened under different management for a short period after, but subsequently closed permanently. The new owners confirmed that it would reopen in the summer of 2023 as Baker Falls, a community-driven rock club. Baker Falls opened in July 2023 and closed one year later.

In 2024, a book on the history of the Pyramid Club called We Started a Nightclub: The Birth of the Pyramid Cocktail Lounge as Told by Those Who Lived It was published by Damiani Books.

The location is now open and called Night Club 101. Under this name, the club has returned to local prominence, being named as one of New York Magazine's 39 Reasons to Love New York in 2025.

== Notable performers ==
- 3 Teens Kill 4
- Andy Warhol
- ANOHNI
- Ann Magnuson
- Babes in Toyland
- Beastie Boys
- Book of Love
- Butthole Surfers
- Chris & Cosey
- Country Joe & the Fish
- Crime and the City Solution
- Jayne County
- Deee-Lite
- Debbie Harry
- Dean Johnson
- Eric Bogosian
- Figures on a Beach
- The Flaming Lips
- The Fleshtones
- The Frogs
- Gwar
- International Chrysis
- Johanna Went
- John Kelly
- John Sex
- Kraut
- Lady Bunny
- Live Skull
- Lypsinka
- Madonna
- Meat Beat Manifesto
- Miss Understood
- Mudhoney
- Nico
- Nirvana
- Psychic TV
- Q Lazzarus
- Rat at Rat R
- Red Hot Chili Peppers
- Rhys Chatham
- Richard Hell
- RuPaul
- Sonic Youth
- Spahn Ranch
- Steve Buscemi
- Swans
- Tabboo
- Taylor Mead
- They Might Be Giants
- The Voluptuous Horror of Karen Black
- The Young Gods
- Vaginal Creme Davis
- Warrior Soul
- Wendy Wild
- White Zombie
