= Make Me Famous (2021 film) =

- Directed by: Brian Vincent
- Produced by: Heather Spore
- Starring: Eric Bogosian; Patti Astor; Kenny Scharf; Duncan Hannah; Frank Holliday; Mark Kostabi; Scott Covert; David McDermott; James Romberger; Marguerite Van Cook; Annina Nosei; Richard Hambleton; Peter McGough; Edward Brezinski
- Edited by: Brian Vincent
- Music by: Jeremiah Bornfield
- Release date: 2021
- Country: United States
- Language: English
- Box office: $70,538

Make Me Famous is a 2021 biographical documentary that explores the life and work of painter Edward Brezinski in his quest for fame.

Directed and edited by Brian Vincent in his feature directorial debut and produced by Heather Spore, it is about the rise and fall of the East Village art scene in New York City in the 1980s through the unlikely lens of little known neo expressionist painter Edward Brezinski. The film premiered at the New York Lesbian, Gay, Bisexual, & Transgender Film Festival on October 17, 2021. It was released exclusively in theaters in the United States on June 22, 2023, by Red Splat Productions. The film received positive reviews from critics.

== Release ==
The film premiered on October 17, 2021, at the New York Lesbian, Gay, Bisexual, & Transgender Film Festival. Make Me Famous had a non-traditional DIY self-distributed theatrical run. The film had a pre-theatrical run in Toronto at the Hot Docs Ted Rogers Cinema in January 2023.

=== UK Release ===
The UK release was in Feb 2023 at the Bertha Dochouse Curzon Cinema in Bloomsbury and the Institute of Contemporary Arts London. This run was extended for a total of three weeks at the Bertha Dochouse.

=== Domestic Release ===
Domestically, the film had a sold out pre-theatrical sneak peek at the Museum of the City of New York on April 18, 2023. The film was released in theaters in a self-distributed theatrical with openings on June 22, 2023 at the Roxy Cinema and June 23, 2023 at the New Plaza Cinema with additional screenings at the Alamo Drafthouse in Lower Manhattan.

The film had screenings across the US in major markets on notable screens such as Los Angeles Laemmle Theaters, San Francisco Roxie Theater, Kansas City Nelson-Atkins Museum of Art, Detroit at Cinema Detroit, Philadelphia at Lightbox Cinema and Indianapolis at Kan Kan Cinema. The film has played 45 cities and 9 countries.

With a continued presence in New York City, the film screened 17 times at Roxy Cinema and played monthly at the New Plaza Cinema for 26 screenings. Other notable screens who programmed the film in New York City were Nighthawk Cinema in Prospect Park and Williamsburg and Syndicated Brooklyn in Bushwick. On July 27, 2024 the film will screen on the Lower East Side at the Village East by Angelika.

== Reception ==
=== Critical Response ===
On the review aggregator website Rotten Tomatoes, 100% of 41 critics' reviews are positive, with an average rating of 7.5/10. The website’s consensus reads, “”Make Me Famous” brings notoriety to its subject and his peers while delivering a gritty time capsule of New York City's art scene before it was gentrified.”

The Hollywood Reporter wrote "The first half of the project breathlessly divulges as much information about Brzezinski as possible, sketching his character through his makeshift community’s vision. There is a straightforward tone, an uncomplicated visual style, and a focus on the interviewees’ stories and ideas, which occasionally take one too many tangents. Suddenly it all changes, and Make Me Famous adopts a true-crime quality."

The Guardian called the film a "touching documentary revisits the grimy Manhattan of the 70s and 80s in search of long-lost painter Edward Brezinski."

Artforum called the film a "brilliantly digressive structure for a feature-length movie...remarkably loving and deeply empathetic conjuring for which Vincent should be commended, the conceit of this picture, what has indeed sold it so successfully to audiences, is how its protagonist is ultimately a surrogate, a blank upon which we can project the full spectrum of desire and dread that circulates through creative ambition like the lifeblood of culture.”

=== Box Office ===
The opening weekend Box Office Gross was $5757 across 5 screenings. Domestically, the film earned $51,809 with an eventized theatrical model and in the UK earned $4572 on two screens.

The Numbers which tracks film box office revenue lists the film with milestones in all-time records for Limited Release Movies.

Biggest Weekend at the Domestic Box Office for Limited Release Movies

1. Ranked 61 in 39th Weekend
2. Ranked 52 in 42nd Weekend
3. Ranked 64 in 43rd Weekend
4. Ranked 49 in 48th Weekend
5. Ranked 29 in 54th Weekend

== See also ==
- List of films with a 100% rating on Rotten Tomatoes
