= James Romberger =

American artist (born 1958)

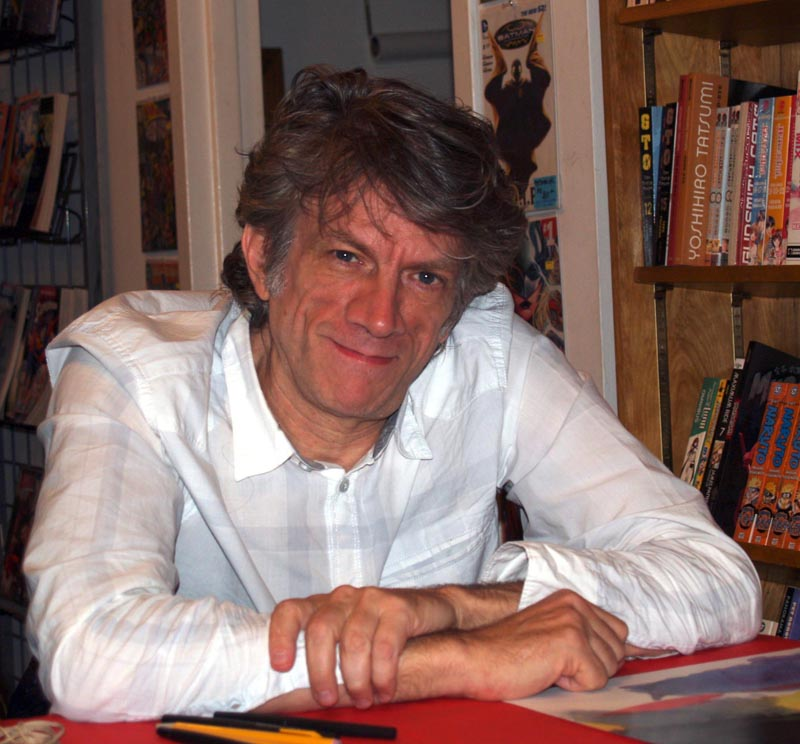
- Romberger at November 2014 signing for The Late Child at JHU Comics in Manhattan
- Born: 1958 (age 67–68) United States
- Notable works: Post York; Seven Miles A Second

James Romberger (born 1958) is an American artist known for his depictions of New York City's Lower East Side.

Romberger's pastel drawings of the ravaged landscape of the Lower East Side and its citizens are in many public and private collections, including the Metropolitan Museum of Art, Brooklyn Museum, Parrish Art Museum, Harvard Business School and the Library of Congress. His solo and collaborative exhibitions have appeared at Ground Zero Gallery NY, the Grace Borgenicht Gallery, Gracie Mansion Gallery, James Fuentes, Dorian Gray and the New Museum of Contemporary Art.

Ground Zero, Romberger's science-fiction comic strip collaboration with his partner, multimedia artist, writer, musician and filmmaker Marguerite Van Cook, was serialized through the 1980s and 1990s in The East Village Eye, Redtape and other downtown NYC magazines, and the pair co-directed the noted installation gallery Ground Zero at the height of the East Village Art Scene, 1985–87, debuting their own early solo shows and artists such as Peggy Cyphers, Edward Brezinski, Colab member Christof Kohlhofer and including two shows by multimedia artist and AIDS activist David Wojnarowicz, most famously the harrowing installation and film You Killed Me First, his 1986 collaboration with Cinema of Transgression director Richard Kern.

As the East Village art scene wound down in 1986, Romberger had begun to work with Wojnarowicz on the comics project that would become the critically acclaimed graphic novel Seven Miles A Second. Wojnarowicz saw the first two sections drawn by Romberger, but became ill with AIDS and died before the third could be completed. Romberger finally finished the book using Wojnarowicz's final journals in 1994 and the original art was shown at Wojnarowicz's gallery PPOW. In 1996 it was colored by Van Cook to be first published by Vertigo as a one-shot under their short-lived Vertigo Verite imprint in 1996. The book was reissued in revised and expanded form in hardcover as 7 Miles a Second by Fantagraphics Books in February 2013, and again in paperback by Ground Zero Books in 2018. The book often crosses the boundaries between galleries and comics: it has become a classic of graphic memoir, and was given its own room in the New Museum's 1999 Wojnarowicz retrospective, and included in the Museum of Modern Art's end-of-the-millennium show "Open Ends", as well as being part of many other queer-themed shows to date in America and abroad.

Romberger's other efforts in comics include his earliest work for Marvel Comics's Epic Illustrated and the political comics zine World War 3 Illustrated, Image Comics' NYC Mech, and short stories in multiple volumes of DC Comics imprint Paradox Press' The Big Book of series. DC/Vertigo published Romberger's work on the "Renegade" storyline in Jamie Delano's often reprinted miniseries 2020 Visions; The Bronx Kill, a graphic novel with writer Peter Milligan; and in 2011, the terrorism fable "Aaron and Ahmed," a collaboration with MacArthur Prize fellow Jay Cantor and colorist José Villarrubia. In 2015 Romberger adapted and drew Van Cook's generational graphic memoir The Late Child and Other Animals, which is published by Fantagraphics Books; one of its linked stories "Nature Lessons" was nominated for best short story in that year's Ignatz Awards.

Romberger's comic book Post York was published in 2012 by Uncivilized Books; in 2013 it was nominated for an Eisner Award for Best Single Issue/One-Shot. In 2021, Romberger expanded Post York to a graphic novel for Berger Books/Dark Horse; it includes an afterword about the real effects of global warming on Manhattan, that he based on research done at his request by the sustainability thinktank Unbuilt Labs.

In 2019 Romberger returned to Uncivilized Books with his semi-fictional comic about Jack Kirby, The Oven, and a supporting essay in the first issue of what he says will be an ongoing, sporadic anthology title, For Real. Romberger in 2022 teamed with artist Josh Bayer for an etched 7" vinyl single and comic book for the Chicago punk band Naked Raygun's song "Broken Things," funded by a Kickstarter campaign.

Romberger and Van Cook co-star (as themselves) in the 2021 feature film Make Me Famous, a documentary about the life and mysterious death of their Ground Zero artist Edward Brezinski. The pair traveled to France with the filmmakers; additionally Romberger's fine art drawings are featured throughout the movie and he and Van Cook also drew narrative recreation sequences specifically for the production. Original Cin explains: "The camera follows Brezinski's friends and fellow artists Marguerite Van Cook and James Romberger to Europe where they seek the truth." Hollywood Reporter raves, "a trove of thrilling interviews with survivors of a harrowing period." On Rotten Tomatoes, the film has an approval rating of 100% based on reviews from 24 critics.

Romberger has also taught at Parsons School of Design, Marywood University and Hunter College; and written for Publishers Weekly, and the pop culture websites Comics Journal, Comics Beat and Hooded Utilitaria
