= List of people from Burbank, California =

Burbank, California
- Location within California Location within the United States
- Coordinates: 34°10′49″N 118°19′42″W
- Country: United States
- State: California
- County: Los Angeles

Burbank, California, is a suburb of Los Angeles. Located 7 miles (11 km) northwest of downtown Los Angeles, Burbank had a population of 105,833 as of 2025. With its proximity to Hollywood, and film and television studios, Burbank has many notable people in the entertainment industry.

Ron Howard, star of Happy Days and director of Apollo 13, made clear his Burbank connections in his book The Boys: A Memoir of Hollywood and Family. Howard has been involved in 28 feature films over his career. Director Tim Burton, Beetlejuice Beetlejuice and Sweeney Todd: The Demon Barber of Fleet Street, grew up in Burbank. His awkward teenage experience led directly to the film Edward Scissorhands, his memoir of growing up in Burbank.

Debbie Reynolds, Miss Burbank 1948, has famously described how she came from Burbank. Reynolds, star of Singing in the Rain and The Unsinkable Molly Brown, acted for nearly 70 years. Her daughter, actress Carrie Fisher, star of Star Wars and author of Postcards From The Edge, was born in Burbank. Rene Russo, star of Nightcrawler and The Thomas Crown Affair, grew up in Burbank, and has appeared in over 27 films.

Baseball players from Burbank include Doug DeCinces (All Star and Silver Slugger), Mike Magnante (Featured in Moneyball) and Frank Sullivan (Two-time All Star). Glenn Davis won the Heisman Trophy in 1946 while playing football for the Army.

Kelly Johnson, chief engineer at the Skunk Works, part of the Lockheed Corporation, worked nearly his entire career in Burbank. He was recognized for his contributions to the U-2 and SR-71 reconnaissance planes. Musician Bonnie Raitt was born in Burbank, while guitarist Randy Rhoads lived there for most of his short life.

The following list includes notable people who were born or have lived in Burbank, California. For a similar list organized alphabetically by last name, see the category page People from Burbank, California.

== Academics and engineering ==
Name	Image	Birth	Death	Known for	Association	Reference
Jane Bauman				Art professor, Coastline Community College	Born and raised in Burbank	
Kelly Johnson		February 27, 1910	December 21, 1990	Chief engineer, Lockheed Skunk Works	Lockheed Skunk Works	

== Crime ==
Name	Image	Birth	Death	Known for	Association	Reference
Edmund Kemper		December 18, 1948		serial killer	Born in Burbank	

== Entertainment Industry ==
Name	Image	Birth	Death	Known for	Association	Reference
Olga Celeste		April 9, 1888	August 31, 1969	Animal trainer	Lived in Burbank	

== Actors, Actresses, Directors ==
Name	Image	Birth	Death	Known for	Association	Reference
Tyler Blackburn		October 12, 1986		actor, singer, model	Born in Burbank	
Kelly Blatz		June 16, 1987		Actor, director, writer	Born and raised in Burbank. Graduate of Burbank High School	
Tim Burton		August 25, 1958		Filmmaker, artist	Born and raised in Burbank. Graduate of Burbank High School. Directed Edward Scissorhands, seen as Burton's autobiography of his childhood in Burbank.	
Darcy Rose Byrnes		November 4, 1998		Actress	Born and raised in Burbank	
Eddie Cibrian		June 16, 1973		Actor	Born and raised in Burbank	
Debbe Dunning		July 11, 1966		Actress, model	Born and raised in Burbank	
Angie Dickinson		September 30, 1931		Actress	Lived in Burbank, graduated Bellarmine-Jefferson High School	
Carrie Fisher		October 21, 1956	December 27, 2016	actress, writer, humorist	Born in Burbank	
Andrew Gold		August 2, 1951	June 3, 2011	Singer, songwriter, record producer	Born and raised in Burbank	
Mark Harmon		September 2, 1951		actor, writer, producer, television director and football player.	Born in Burbank	
Clint Howard		April 20, 1959		Actor	Born, raised, lives in Burbank; Graduate of John Burroughs High School	
Ron Howard		March 1, 1954		Actor, director	Born and raised in Burbank; Graduate of John Burroughs High School	
Jeremy Howard (actor)		June 12, 1981		Actor	Born in Burbank	
Ashley Johnson		August 9, 1983		Actress	Lived in Burbank	
Blake Lively		August 25, 1987		Actress	Born and raised in Burbank	
Masiela Lusha		October 23, 1985		Actress, author	Lives in Burbank, Graduate of Burbank High School.	
Cady McClain		October 13, 1969		Actress, singer, author	Born in Burbank	
Tim Matheson		December 31, 1947		actor, director	raised in Burbank, graduate of John Burroughs High School	
Erin Moran		October 18, 1960	April 22, 2017	Actress	Born in Burbank	
Patton Oswalt		January 27, 1969		Stand-up comedian, actor	Lived in Burbank	
Eve Plumb		April 29, 1958		Actress, singer	Born in Burbank	
Debbie Reynolds		April 1, 1932	December 28, 2016	Actress, singer	Miss Burbank 1948	
John Ritter		September 17, 1948	September 11, 2003	Actor	Born in Burbank	
Kerry Rossall		June 23, 1947		Stuntman and actor	Born in Burbank	
Rene Russo		February 17, 1954		Model, actress	Born and raised in Burbank	
Vic Tayback		January 6, 1930	May 25, 1990	Actor	Graduate of Burbank High School and lived most of his life in Burbank.	
Wil Wheaton		July 29, 1972		Actor, writer	Lived in Burbank as a young man	
Anson Williams		September 25, 1949		Actor, director	Lived in Burbank. Graduate of Burbank High School	
Mara Wilson		July 24, 1987		Actress	Born and raised in Burbank	
Rob Zabrecky		June 2, 1968		Actor, author, magician	Born and raised in Burbank	

== Music Industry ==
Name	Image	Birth	Death	Known for	Association	Reference
Scott Borchetta		July 3, 1962		President/CEO of Big Machine Records	Born in Burbank	
Andrew Gold		August 2, 1951	June 3, 2011	Multi-instrumentalist and songwriter, notable pop/soft rock musician	Born in Burbank	
Bonnie Raitt		November 8, 1949		Singer, guitarist, songwriter	Born in Burbank	
Randy Rhoads		December 6, 1956	March 19, 1982	Guitarist, Quiet Riot, Ozzy Osbourne	Lived in Burbank, Graduate of John Muir middle school and Burbank High School.	
Kendall Schmidt		November 2, 1990		Actor, singer, formed band Heffron Drive – part of Big Time Rush	Lives in Burbank	
Ryan Shore		December 29, 1974		Film composer	Lives in Burbank	

== Military ==
Name	Image	Birth	Death	Known for	Association	Reference
John F. Aiso		December 14, 1909	December 29, 1987	lawyer; jurist; Lt Col, US Army. Advocate for Japanese Americans during WWII.	Born in Burbank; Lived there for some time; died at Providence Saint Joseph Medical Center.	
Larry Maxam		January 9, 1948	February 2, 1968	Marine, Medal of Honor	Lived in Burbank	

== Politics and law ==
Name	Image	Birth	Death	Known for	Association	Reference
John F. Aiso		December 14, 1909	December 29, 1987	lawyer; jurist; Lt Col, US Army. Advocate for Japanese Americans during WWII.	Born in Burbank; Lived there for some time; died at Providence Saint Joseph Medical Center.	
Ben Shapiro		January 15, 1984		Political commentator, media host	Lived in Burbank	

== Religion ==
Name	Image	Birth	Death	Known for	Association	Reference
Samuel J. Aquila		September 24, 1950		Archbishop of Denver, Colorado	Born in Burbank	
William M. Kramer		March 29, 1920	June 8, 2004	rabbi, university professor, art collector	Rabbi of Temple Beth Emet 1965–1996	

== Athletes ==
Name	Image	Birth	Death	Known for	Association	Reference
Manny Ayulo		October 20, 1921	May 17, 1955	race car driver; Indianapolis 500 competitor	Born and worked in Burbank	
Kyle Boller		June 17, 1981		Quarterback	Born in Burbank	
Paul Cameron		August 17, 1932	December 22, 2023	Football player	Born and raised in Burbank. Graduate of Burbank High School	
Glenn Davis		December 26, 1924	March 9, 2005	Football player, Heisman Trophy winner	Born in Burbank	
Doug DeCinces		August 29, 1950		Major league baseball, third baseman	Born in Burbank	
Jason Hirsh		February 20, 1982		Major league baseball, pitcher	Born in Burbank	
Max Homa		November 19, 1990		Golfer	Born in Burbank	
James J. Jeffries		April 15, 1875	March 3, 1953	Boxer, world champion, farmer	Lived on a ranch in Burbank	
Natasha Kuchiki		October 28, 1976		Figure skater	Born in Burbank	
Ryan Lavarnway		August 7, 1987		Major League Baseball catcher	Born in Burbank	
Mike Magnante		June 17, 1965		Major League Baseball pitcher	Lived in Burbank, Graduate and coach of John Burroughs High School	
Remy Martin		June 16, 1998		Basketball player	Born in Burbank	
Katie Meyer		January 20, 2000	March 1, 2022	Soccer player; death by suicide	Born and raised in Burbank	
Sandy Neilson		March 20, 1956		Olympic swimming gold medalist	Born in Burbank	
Jeff Nelson (runner)		March 28, 1961		Long-distance runner	Born and raised in Burbank	
Todd Sand		October 30, 1963		Pair skater	Born in Burbank	
Daniel Steres		November 11, 1990		Soccer player	Born in Burbank	
Frank Sullivan		January 23, 1930	January 19, 2016	Major league baseball pitcher	Born and raised in Burbank. Graduate of Burbank High School	
