= Marguerite Van Cook =

English artist, writer, musician/singer and filmmaker

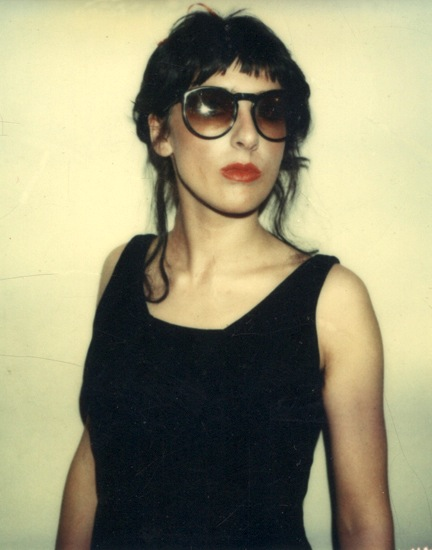
- Marguerite Van Cook in 1978
- Born: Marguerite Martin; 1954 (age 71–72); Portsmouth, England
- Known for: Fine art, punk rock, graphic novels
- Notable work: Seven Miles a Second

Marguerite Van Cook (née Martin, born 1954) is an English artist, writer, musician/singer and filmmaker.

== Early life and education ==
Van Cook was born in Portsmouth, England. She attended Portsmouth College of Art and Design, Northumbria University Graphic and Fine Arts programs, BMCC, and Columbia University for English (BA) and Modern European Studies (MA). She holds a Ph.D. in French on eighteenth century political economics in the work of women writers from CUNY Graduate Center. She has also served as an adjunct professor at Columbia University and currently at the Fashion Institute of Technology (FIT) in New York.

== Career ==
=== Music ===
Van Cook was the lead singer for The Innocents, a UK punk band, who toured as opening act for The Clash and The Slits on the "Sort it Out Tour." After this group disbanded, she joined "Steppin' Razor," an all female reggae band, as the bass player. They opened for Yellowman at Harlem World.

=== Art career ===
Van Cook opened and ran Ground Zero Gallery NY with her partner James Romberger in the East Village Art scene, from 1983 to 1986. Among the gallery presentations was the David Wojnarowicz show Mexican Diaries, which informed the video A Fire in My Belly, which sparked a controversy when it was removed from the exhibition Hide/Seek from the National Portrait Gallery in 2011. Under the banner of "Ground Zero", the couple curated and produced shows at Danceteria, Max Fish and other downtown clubs. In 1991, she became the director of Elston Fine Arts. In 2003, together with Romberger she directed the Fine Art elements of the Howl! Festival, an annual festival of the East Village, which included public outdoor sculpture exhibits, gallery shows. In 2006, she became the director and producer of the festival.

Van Cook has presented solo and group shows and her work is in many major public collections. Van Cook has presented works as a performance artist. She was part of a collaborative group curated by Carlo McCormick, which included, James Romberger, David West, Marilyn Minter, David Wojnarowicz, Christof Kolhofer, Keiko Bonk and Luis Frangella. Together they painted installations in New York and Virginia.

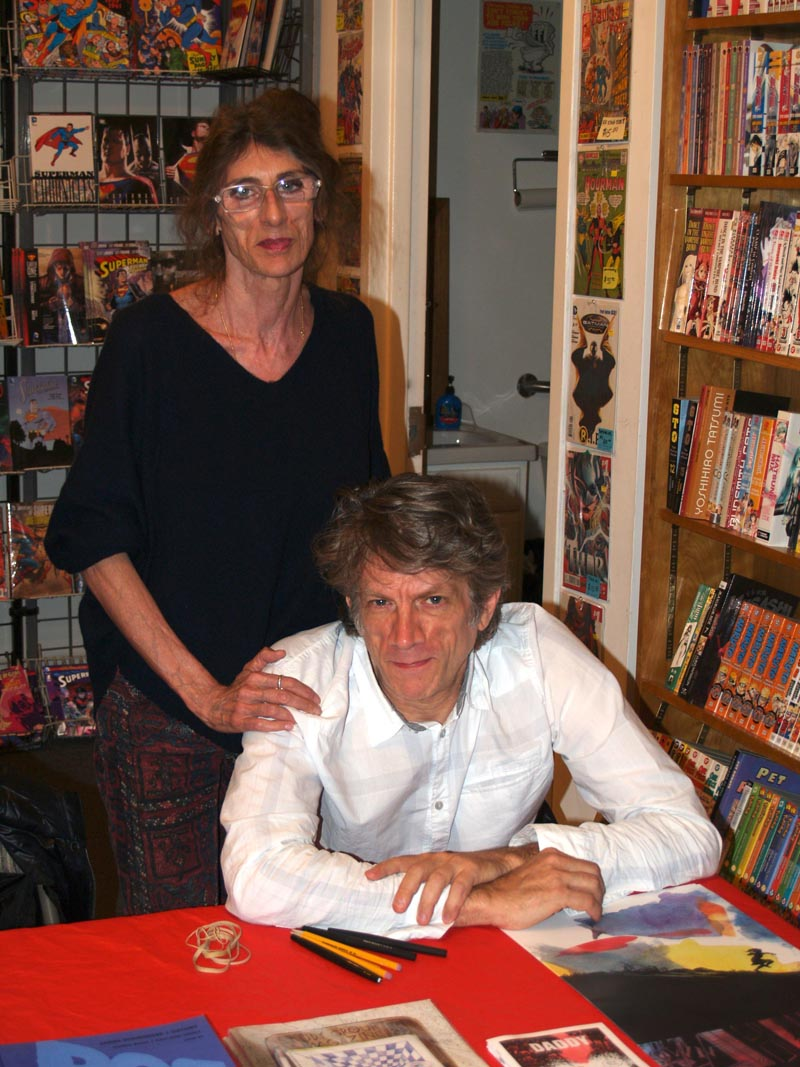
Van Cook and her partner, James Romberger, at a November 2014 signing for The Late Child at Jim Hanley's Universe in Manhattan

=== Film ===
Van Cook produced and directed the film Funky Shui in New York. Additionally, she appeared in David Wojnarowicz and Tommy Turner's film Where Evil Dwells, as well as taking the role of Red Snapper in Nick Zedd and Rev.Jen's series Electra Elf.

=== Writing ===
While attending Columbia University, Van Cook won the Van Rensselaer Poetry Prize, previously won by notables such as John Berryman and Thomas Merton. Her book "Stigma" is in the "Joan Flasch Artists' Book Collection" and her periodical The Murdering Class was carried by art book distributors "Printed Matter". Other publications in which her work has appeared include "Peau Sensible", or "Sensitive Skin", "The Hooded Utilitarian" and in Sounds for whom she wrote music reviews.

=== Comics and graphic novels ===
Of her comics work, Van Cook is known for her colour work on the graphic novel Seven Miles a Second, with Romberger and David Wojnarowicz. Van Cook was nominated for an Eisner Award in 2014 for her work on this book in the category of Best Painter/Multimedia Artist (interior art). The graphic novel was reprinted in 2013 as 7 Miles a Second by Fantagraphics Books publishers with amended colour production. It rose to No. 5 on the New York Times best-seller list. The original artwork was shown at the New Museum and the comic was included in the Museum of Modern Art "Open Ends, Millennium Show". In 2014 she wrote and colored The Late Child and Other Animals, a generational memoir, which was adapted and drawn by James Romberger and published by Fantagraphics Books. The story "Nature Lessons" from the book received an Ignatz nomination for "Outstanding Story" in 2015. She has worked for DC Comics as a writer and colorist. She has collaborated on a comic Ground Zero with James Romberger, which was serialized through the 1980s and 1990s in various downtown literary magazines.
