= Make Me Famous =

Make Me Famous may refer to:

- Make Me Famous (band), a Ukrainian metalcore band
- Make Me Famous (2020 film), a British television film
- Make Me Famous (2021 film), a documentary about painter Edward Brezinski
