= Xenology (disambiguation) =

Xenology may refer to:

- Xenology, studies of aliens (foreigners or extraterrestrials)
- Sequence homology § Xenology, homology resulting from horizontal gene transfer
- Krzysztof Wodiczko § Xenology, an artistic concept of Wodiczko
