= Ground Zero Gallery =

Art gallery in Manhattan, New York

Coordinates: 40.727°N 73.981°W

Ground Zero Gallery was an art gallery formed in the East Village of Manhattan in New York City in mid-1983 as a vehicle for the partnership of artist James Romberger and his co-founder Marguerite Van Cook. In 1984, the gallery found its first physical home on East 11th Street and showed the work of many East Village artists who went on to gain national recognition. It was an early proponent of installation art. Ground Zero was the production name for many projects in various media undertaken by the team of Van Cook and Romberger prior to the September 11 attacks.

== Early years ==
Ground Zero opened its first gallery site in 1984. It remained in this location until the following year, when it moved into a larger space on East Tenth Street facing Tompkins Square Park. Romberger and Van Cook presented and pioneered the concept of installations and multimedia environments and hosted many performance events. These included the première of Cinema of Transgression director Richard Kern’s You Killed Me First, featuring Karen Finley and David Wojnarowicz, which was part of an installation presented by David Wojnarowicz entitled Installation number 8. Other installations presented were Hell by Mike Osterhout, Zero Gravity by Dragan Ilic and Cold War by Marguerite Van Cook.

The Gallery was also home to collaborative installations, such as The Nuclear Family curated by Carlo McCormick featuring the work of David West, Keiko Bonk, Andy Soma, David Wojnarowicz, James Romberger and Marguerite Van Cook. Artists shown by Ground Zero include: Edward Brezinski, Peggy Cyphers, John Drury, Christof Kohlhofer, David West, David Wojnarowicz, Calvin Reid, PHASE 2, Sharp, Delta Dos, Arnold Wechsler, Martin Wong and Michael Roman.

In 1986 the gallery moved again to a site on East Ninth Street where among the curations was the David Wojnarowicz show Mexican Diaries, which informs portions of the video A Fire in My Belly, the subject of the 2011 controversy sparked by the removal of the work from the exhibition Hide/Seek at the National Portrait Gallery.

== Night club curation ==
During the 1980s, the New York City nightclub scene provided the home for many alternative art installations. The Ground Zero team of Van Cook and Romberger curated many nightclub art shows, at venues such as Danceteria, Palace de Beaute, Kamikaze, The World and Max Fish. These shows included many other notable artists including: John Drury, Stephen Lack, Manuel De Landa, Joseph Nechvatal, Kiki Smith, Walter Robinson, Julius Klein, Nick Zedd, Thom Corn, Mark and Matt Enger, Conrad Vogel, Phoebe Legere, Cheryl Dyer, Selwyn Garaway.

== Comic ==
The comic strip by the name of Ground Zero, written and drawn Romberger and Van Cook, is a semi-autobiographical, meta-narrative look at the authors’ lives on the Lower East Side and beyond. In its inception, the comic was heavily influenced by the philosophy of Roland Barthes, deconstructionism and film-maker Jean Marie Straub. The strip/pages were conceptually designed to challenge the reader. Consequently, it was rarely printed in the same publication more than three times and experimented with diverse drawing styles, media and processes of printing.
