= Scott Covert =

American artist

- Born: 1954 (age 71–72); Edison, New Jersey, U.S.
- Known for: Rubbings, painting
- Movement: East Village

Scott Covert (born 1954) is an American artist who, in the 1970s and 1980s, became a fixture of the East Village arts scene and cofounded Playhouse 57 with theater artist Andy Rees at the nightclub Club 57.

In 1979, Covert had his first solo show, curated by Keith Haring, at Club 57, he has since exhibited at galleries around the world.

According to an interview with the BBC, Covert made his first grave rubbing The Dead Supreme, in 1985. He was influenced by founding Supremes member Florence Ballard, who died in 1976 aged only 32. "I was always a Supremes person," he explained.

The Daily Telegraph wrote about Covert's work saying "Scott Covert has spent almost 40 years at the graves of celebrities, from actors to serial killers, the Shah of Iran in Cairo and Oscar Wilde in Père Lachaise. Using oil wax crayons, he makes detailed rubbings, then adorns them with colours and marks; sometimes a mass of inscriptions is built up into a grander, collaged form. He refers to the names, or the works, as “characters”. Unlike people, they cannot die."

In a 2020 Hauser & Wirth related article, Covert said "I was in a fake post-punk band, Youth Against Death, along with Frank Holliday, Nancy Ferrara, Natalya Maystrenko and Kathy Dumas on camera—we did flyers and interviews, never picked up an instrument.

Covert appeared in the 2021 documentary Make Me Famous.
