= Wojnarowicz (film) =

- Directed by: Chris McKim
- Produced by: Chris McKim; Fenton Bailey; Randy Barbato
- Production company: World of Wonder
- Release date: November 2020 (DOC NYC)
- Running time: 105 minutes
- Language: English

Wojnarowicz: F**k You F*ggot F**ker is a 2020 American biographical documentary film about David Wojnarowicz, directed by Chris McKim. The film premiered at 2020 DOC NYC. It was intended to premiere at the 2020 Tribeca Film Festival before the festival was cancelled due to the COVID-19 pandemic.

== Production and distribution ==
Kino Lorber obtained distribution rights in North America.

McKim cited Cynthia Carr's biography Fire in the Belly as a "great overview for me going into the project".

== Reception ==
On Rotten Tomatoes, the documentary holds an approval rating of 97% based on 34 reviews, with an average rating of 8.10/10.

In The New Yorker, Richard Brody praised the film's "analytical animation and graphics".

Marc Savlov of The Austin Chronicle rated the film four out of five stars.

In The Hollywood Reporter David Rooney ascribed the 'strength' of the film to "the extent to which [McKim] channels Wojnarowicz's own perspective on these experiences" from the outset.
