= David Wojnarowicz =

American artist and AIDS activist (1954–1992)

- David Wojnarowicz, from the book Fire in the Belly: The Life and Times of David Wojnarowicz
- Born: September 14, 1954; Red Bank, New Jersey, U.S.
- Died: July 22, 1992 (aged 37); New York City, U.S.
- Cause of death: AIDS

David Michael Wojnarowicz (/ˌvɔɪnəˈroʊvɪtʃ/ VOY-nə-ROH-vitch; September 14, 1954 – July 22, 1992) was an American painter, photographer, writer, filmmaker, performance artist, songwriter/recording artist, and AIDS activist prominent in the East Village art scene. He incorporated personal narratives influenced by his struggle with AIDS as well as his political activism in his art until his death from the disease in 1992.

== Biography ==
Wojnarowicz was born in Red Bank, New Jersey, where he and his two siblings and sometimes their mother were physically abused by their father, Ed Wojnarowicz. Ed, a Polish-American merchant marine from Detroit, had met and married Dolores McGuinness in Sydney, Australia, in 1948 when he was 26 and she was 16. After his parents' bitter divorce, Wojnarowicz and his siblings were kidnapped by their father and raised in Michigan and Long Island. After finding their young, Australian-born mother in a New York City phone book, they moved in with her. During his teenage years in Manhattan, Wojnarowicz worked as a street hustler around Times Square. He graduated from the High School of Music & Art in Manhattan. By 1971, at age 17, Wojnarowicz was living on the streets full time, sleeping in halfway houses and squats.

After a period outside New York, Wojnarowicz returned in the late 1970s and emerged as one of the most prominent and prolific members of an avant-garde wing that used mixed media as well as graffiti and street art. His first recognition came from stencils of houses afire that appeared on the exposed sides of East Village buildings.

Wojnarowicz completed a 1977–1979 photographic series on Arthur Rimbaud, did stencil work and collaborated with the band 3 Teens Kill 4, which released the independent EP No Motive in 1982. He made autonomous super-8 films such as Heroin and Beautiful People with bandmate Jesse Hultberg, and collaborated with filmmakers Richard Kern and Tommy Turner of the Cinema of Transgression. He exhibited his work in well-known East Village galleries and New York City landmarks, notably Civilian Warfare Gallery, Ground Zero Gallery NY, Public Illumination Picture Gallery, Gracie Mansion Gallery, and Hal Bromm Gallery.

Wojnarowicz was also connected to other prolific artists of the time, appearing in or collaborating on works with Nan Goldin, Peter Hujar, Luis Frangella, Karen Finley, Kiki Smith, James Romberger, Marguerite Van Cook, Ben Neill, Marion Scemama, and Phil Zwickler.

In early 1981, Wojnarowicz met the photographer Peter Hujar, and after a brief period as lovers, came to see Hujar as his great friend and mentor. Weeks after Hujar died of AIDS on November 26, 1987, Wojnarowicz moved into his loft at 189 2nd Avenue. He was soon diagnosed with AIDS himself and, after successfully fighting the landlord to keep the lease, lived the last five years of his life in Hujar's loft. Inheriting Hujar’s dark room—and supplies like rare Portriga Rapid paper—was a boon to Wojnarowicz's artistic process. It was in this loft that he printed elements of his ‘Sex Series’ and an edition of “Untitled (Buffalos)”.

Hujar's death moved Wojnarowicz to create much more explicit activism and political content, notably about the social and legal injustices related to the government response to the AIDS epidemic. He collaborated with video artist Tom Rubnitz on the short film Listen to This (1992), a critique of the Reagan and Bush administrations' homophobic responses and failure to address the crisis. The film was shown at MoMA's 2017-18 exhibit Club 57: Film, Performance, and Art in the East Village, 1978–1983.

In 1985, Wojnarowicz was included in the Whitney Biennial's so-called Graffiti Show. In the 1990s, he sued and obtained an injunction against Donald Wildmon and the American Family Association on the grounds that Wojnarowicz's work had been copied and distorted in violation of the New York Artists' Authorship Rights Act.

Wojnarowicz's works include Untitled (One Day This Kid...), Untitled (Buffalo), Water, Birth of Language II, Untitled (Shark), Untitled (Peter Hujar), Tuna, Peter Hujar Dreaming/Yukio Mishima: St. Sebastian, Delta Towels, True Myth (Domino Sugar), Something From Sleep II, Untitled (Face in Dirt), and I Feel a Vague Nausea.

Wojnarowicz also wrote two memoirs in his lifetime including Close to the Knives: A Memoir of Disintegration, discussing topics such as his troubled childhood, becoming a renowned artist in New York City, and his AIDS diagnosis and Memories that Smell like Gasoline. Knives opens with an essay about his homeless years: a boy in glasses selling his skinny body to the pedophiles and creeps who hung around Times Square. The heart of Knives is the title essay, which deals with the sickness and death of Hujar, Wojnarowicz's lover, best friend and mentor, "my brother, my father, my emotional link to the world". In the final essay, "The Suicide of a Guy Who Once Built an Elaborate Shrine Over a Mouse Hole", Wojnarowicz investigates the suicide of a friend, mixing his own reflections with interviews with members of their shared circle. In 1989, Wojnarowicz appeared in Rosa von Praunheim's widely acclaimed film Silence = Death about gay artists in New York City fighting for the rights of AIDS sufferers.

Wojnarowicz died at home in Manhattan on July 22, 1992, at the age of 37, from what his boyfriend Tom Rauffenbart confirmed was AIDS.

After his death, photographer and artist Zoe Leonard, a friend of Wojnarowicz, exhibited a work inspired by him, Strange Fruit (for David).

== Legacy ==
=== A Fire in My Belly controversy ===
In November 2010, after consultation with National Portrait Gallery director Martin Sullivan and co-curator David C. Ward but not co-curator Jonathan David Katz, Smithsonian Institution Secretary G. Wayne Clough removed an edited version of footage used in Wojnarowicz's short silent film A Fire in My Belly from the exhibit "Hide/Seek: Difference and Desire in American Portraiture" at the National Portrait Gallery in response to complaints from the Catholic League, U.S. House Minority Leader John Boehner, Representative Eric Cantor and the possibility of reduced federal funding for the Smithsonian. The video contains a scene with a crucifix covered in ants. William Donohue of the Catholic League claimed the work was "hate speech" against Catholics. Gay historian Jonathan Ned Katz wrote:

In 1989 Senator Jesse Helms demonized Robert Mapplethorpe's sexuality, and by extension, his art, and with little effort pulled a cowering art world to its knees. His weapon was threatening to disrupt the already pitiful federal support for the arts, and once again, that same weapon is being brandished, and once again we cower.

==== Response from Clough and Smithsonian ====
Clough later said that although he stood by his decision, it "might have been made too quickly", and called the decision "painful." He said that because of the controversy surrounding the footage and the possibility that it might "spiral out of control", the Smithsonian might have been forced to shut down the entire "Hide/Seek" exhibition, and that was "something he didn't want to happen."

The video work was shown intact when Hide/Seek moved to the Tacoma Art Museum.

==== Response from the art world and the public ====
In response, the curator David C. Ward defended the artwork, saying, "It is not anti-religion or sacrilegious. It is a powerful use of imagery". The Andy Warhol Foundation announced that it would not fund future Smithsonian projects, while several institutions, including the San Francisco Museum of Modern Art and the Tate Modern, scheduled showings of the removed work.

The decision led to multiple protests.

On December 9, National Portrait Gallery Commissioner James T. Bartlett resigned in protest. Clough issued a statement standing by the decision. Several Smithsonian curators criticized the decision, as did critics, with Newsweek arts critic Blake Gopnik diagnosing the complaints as "gay bashing" and not a legitimate public controversy.

=== Notable posthumous exhibitions and publications ===
In 2011, P.P.O.W. Gallery showed Spirituality, an exhibition of Wojnarowicz's drawings, photographs, videos, collages, and personal notebooks; in a review in The Brooklyn Rail, Kara L. Rooney called the show "meticulously researched and commendably curated from a wide array of sources, ... a mini-retrospective, providing context and clues for Wojnarowicz's often elusive, sometimes dangerous, and always brutally honest work."

In 2018, the Whitney Museum of American Art hosted a major retrospective, David Wojnarowicz: History Keeps Me Awake at Night, which was co-curated by the Whitney's David Kiehl and art historian David Breslin. It received international praise.

In 2023, a new book detailing the relationship between Wojnarowicz and his French lover Jean Pierre Delage was published by Primary Information Press. Titled Dear Jean Pierre, it followed the relationship between the two men from 1979 and 1982 through a series of letters, photographs and other correspondence that they sent each other across the ocean. The text and contents of some of these letters were published in The Paris Review alongside the book's release.

== Influence ==
In 1992, the band U2 used Wojnarowicz's tumbling buffalo photograph "Untitled (Buffaloes)" for the cover art of its single "One". The band further adapted this imagery during its Zoo TV Tour. The single and subsequent album became multi-platinum over the next few years, and the band donated a large portion of its earnings to AIDS charities. An oversized gelatin print of "Untitled (Buffaloes)" sold at auction in October 2014 for $125,000, more than four times the estimated price.

In 1988, Wojnarowicz wore a leather jacket with the pink triangle and the text: "If I die of aids - forget burial - just drop my body on the steps of the F.D.A.". In his 1991 memoir Close to the Knives, Wojnarowicz imagined "what it would be like if, each time a lover, friend or stranger died of this disease, their friends, lovers or neighbors would take the dead body and drive with it in a car a hundred miles an hour to Washington, D.C., and blast through the gates of the White House and come to a screeching halt before the entrance and dump their lifeless form on the front steps." On October 11, 1992, activist David Robinson received wide media attention when he dumped the ashes of his partner, Warren Krause, on the grounds of the White House as a protest against President George H. W. Bush's inaction in fighting AIDS. Robinson reported that his action was inspired by this text in Close to the Knives. In 1996, Wojnarowicz's own ashes were scattered on the White House lawn.

His name appears in the lyrics of the Le Tigre song "Hot Topic." Weight of the Earth, the transcription of Wojnarowicz's audio journals, inspired Mega Bog's album Life, and Another, and gives its name to the song "Weight of the Earth, on Paper".

On September 13, 2021, at the Met Gala in New York City the Canadian actor Dan Levy wore an outfit by designer Jonathan Anderson for Loewe which prominently featured an adapted version of Wojnarowicz's artwork F--- You F----- F----- depicting two men kissing while shaped as maps, with the support of the visual artist's estate.

== Collective exhibitions ==
A list of Wojnarowicz's group exhibitions the year prior to his death.

1991

- The Figure in the Landscape, Baumgartner Galleries, February, Washington, DC
- From Desire...A Queer Diary, curated by Nan Goldin, Richard F. Brush Art Gallery Canton, NY
- Whitney Biennial, The Whitney Museum of American Art, New York, NY
- The Art of Advocacy, The Aldrich Museum of Contemporary Art, Ridgefield, CT
- Hands Off!, The New School for Social Research, New York, NY
- Tableaux Du SIDA, Foundation Deutsch, Belmont-Sur-Lausanne, France
- The Third Rail, curated by Karin Bravin, John Post Lee Gallery, New York, NY
- Compassion and Protest: Recent Social and Political Art from the Eli Broad Family Foundation Collection, San Jose Museum of Art, San Jose, CA
- Climbing: The East Village, Hal Bromm Gallery, New York, NY
- American Narrative Painting and Sculpture: The 1980s, Nassau County Museum of Art, Roslyn, NY
- Cruciformed: Images of the Cross since 1980, curated by David Rubin, Cleveland Center for Contemporary Art, Cleveland, OH
- Social Sculpture, curated by Steven Harvey and Elyse Cheney, Vrej Baghoomian Gallery, New York, NY
- The Interrupted Life, New Museum, New York, NY
- Outrageous Desire: The Politics and Aesthetics of Representation in Recent Works by Lesbian and Gay Artists, Rutgers University, Mason Gross School of the Arts, New Brunswick, NJ
- Art of the 1980s: Selections from the Collection of Eli Broad Foundation, Duke University Museum of Art, Durham, NC
- Domenikos Theotokopoulos-A Dialogue, Philippe Briet Gallery, New York, NY
- Fuel, curated by Jay Younger, The Institute of Modern Art, Brisbane, Australia; The Australia Centre for Photography, Sydney, Australia; The Australian Centre for Contemporary Art, Melbourne, Australia
- Desde New York Frangella/Wojnarowicz, Hal Bromm Gallery, New York, NY

== Books ==
- Sounds in the Distance. (1982). Aloes Books.
- Tongues of Flame. (Exhibition Catalog). (1990). Illinois State University.
- Close to the Knives: A Memoir of Disintegration. (1991). Vintage Books.
- Memories That Smell Like Gasoline. (1992). Artspace Books.
- Seven Miles a Second. (Collaborative graphic novel with James Romberger and Marguerite Van Cook, completed posthumously). (1996). Vertigo/DC Comics.
- The Waterfront Journals. (1997). Grove/Atlantic.
- Rimbaud In New York 1978–1979. (Edited by Andrew Roth). (2004). Roth Horowitz, LLC/PPP Editions.
- In the Shadow of the American Dream: The Diaries of David Wojnarowicz. (Amy Scholder, editor). (2000). Grove/Atlantic.
- Willie World. (Illustrator; written by Maggie J. Dubris). (1998). C U Z Editions.
- Weight of the Earth: The Tape Journals of David Wojnarowicz. (Lisa Darms and David O'Neill, editors). (2018). MIT Press.
- Dear Jean Pierre. (James Hoff, editor. Text by Cynthia Carr). (2023). Published by Primary Information.

== Films ==
=== Directed by Wojnarowicz ===
- Heroin – filmed in New York City in 1981, no soundtrack
- Fire in my Belly – filmed in Mexico and New York in 1986 and 1987, no soundtrack
- Beautiful People – filmed in New York City in 1987, no soundtrack

=== About Wojnarowicz ===
- Post Cards from America (1994) – a non-linear biography of Wojnarowicz (Steve McLean, director)
- Wojnarowicz: F**k You F*ggot F**ker (2021) – biographical documentary

== Music and multimedia ==
- 3 Teens Kill 4 EP No Motive 1982
- David Wojnarowicz & Ben Neill: ITSOFOMO (In the Shadow of Forward Motion) LP New Tone Records 1992
- Optic Nerve CD-ROM The Red Hot Organization 1999
- Cross Country 3 x LP Reading Group 2018

== Critical studies and adaptations ==
- Blinderman, Barry ed. David Wojnarowicz : Tongues of Flame, 1990, ISBN 978-0-945558-15-6
- Close to the Knives. (1993) AIDS Positive Underground Theatre. John Roman Baker.
- David Wojnarowicz: Brush Fires in the Social Landscape. (1995). Aperture.
- Wojnarowicz, David, et al., ed. Amy Scholder. Fever: The Art of David Wojnarowicz. (1999). New Museum Books.
- David Wojnarowicz : A Definitive History of Five or Six Years on the Lower East Side, interviews by Sylvère Lotringer, edited by Giancarlo Ambrosino (2006).
- Carr, Cynthia Fire in the Belly: The Life and Times of David Wojnarowicz (2012) St Martin's Press. ISBN 978-1-596-91533-6
- Laing, Olivia The Lonely City: Adventures in the Art of Being Alone (2016) Canongate ISBN 978-1-250-11803-5
- Petro, Anthony (2025). Provoking Religion: Sex, Art, and the Culture Wars. Oxford University Press. ISBN 9780190938437.

== Archival collections ==
The David Wojnarowicz Papers are at the Fales Library at New York University. The Fales Library also houses the papers of John Hall, a high school friend of Wojnarowicz. The papers include a small collection of letters from Wojnarowicz to Hall.

The David Wojnarowicz Foundation maintains an online research archive.

== See also ==
- Joel Wachs, head of Andy Warhol Foundation, protested removal of Wojnarowicz piece
