= The Deli (film) =

- Directed by: John Gallagher
- Written by: John Dorrian; John Gallagher
- Produced by: Sylvia Caminer
- Starring: Mike Starr; Matt Keeslar
- Cinematography: Robert Lechterman
- Edited by: Sue Blainey
- Music by: Ernie Mannix
- Production companies: Golden Monkey Pictures; Caminer-Gallagher Prods.
- Release date: March 14, 1997 (South by Southwest)
- Running time: 96 minutes
- Country: United States
- Language: English

The Deli is a 1997 American independent comedy-drama film directed by John Gallagher and starring Mike Starr and Matt Keeslar.

== Plot ==
At a big city delicatessen we follow the life of a compulsive gambler, Johnny Amico, and a cast of colorful New York characters.

== Cast ==
- Mike Starr as Johnny
- Matt Keeslar as Andy
- Judith Malina as Mrs. Amico
- Brian Vincent as "Pinky"
- Ice-T as Phil, The Meat Man
- Michael Imperioli as Matty
- David Johansen as Cabbie
- Heather Matarazzo as Sabrina
- Debi Mazar as Teresa
- Jerry Stiller as Petey "Cheesecake"
- Frank Vincent as Tommy "Tomatoes"
- Burt Young as J.D.
- Michael Badalucco as Eric, The Soda Man
- Heavy D as Bo
- Iman as Avocado Lady
- William McNamara as Kevin
- Gretchen Mol as Mary
- Chris Noth as Sal
- Tony Sirico as Tony
- Shirley Stoler as Irma

== Reception ==
Michael Wilmington of the Chicago Tribune gave the film a mixed review and wrote, "This movie takes a talented and likable cast and an interesting working-class Italian-American background and then wastes them on sitcom scenes and side-of-the-mouth jokes."

Joe Leydon of Variety also gave it a mixed review and wrote that "this small-budget indie comedy is too slight to make much impact on critics or ticketbuyers."
