= 3 Teens Kill 4 =

American post-punk band

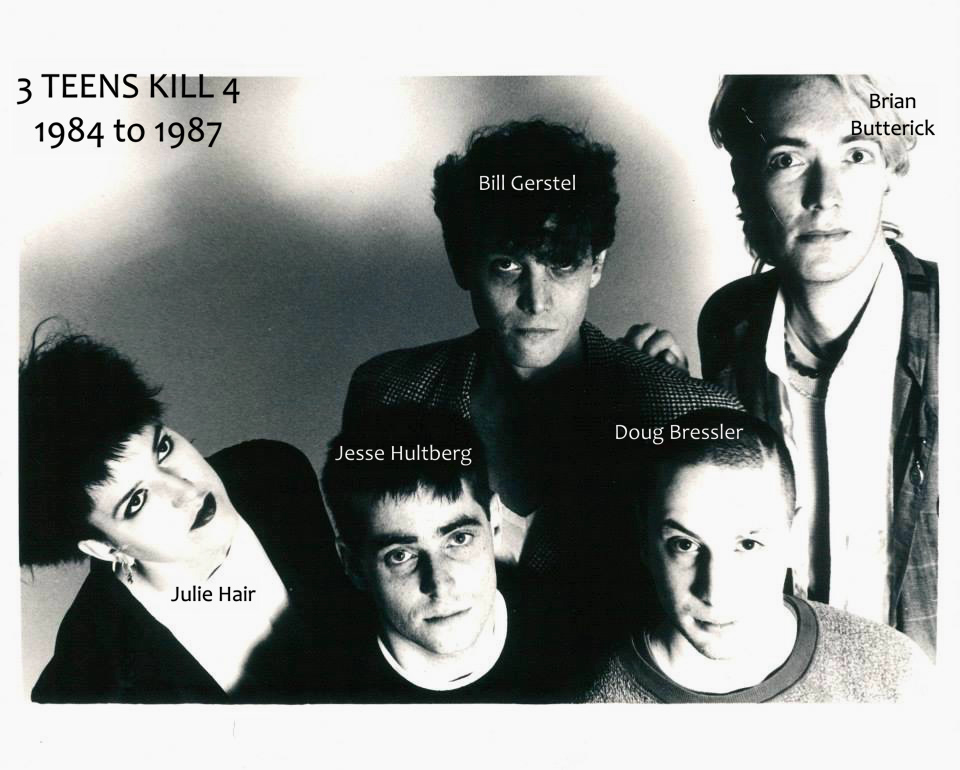
3 Teens Kill 4 circa 1985

3 Teens Kill 4 (also abbreviated as 3TK4) was a musical group based in the East Village of New York City in the 1980s. They are notable for featuring David Wojnarowicz, a famous visual artist and photographer, as a member.

== History ==
In 1980, Brian Butterick, Jesse Hultberg and David Wojnarowicz worked as busboys at New York City's Danceteria on West 37th street, before the club was closed down for not having a liquor license. The Danceteria staff party was held at TR3 in Soho in December 1980, and was 3 Teens Kill 4's first performance. The poet Max Blagg chose the name from a New York Post headline, and performed with them along with others from Danceteria.

Julie Hair joined the band for their third show, adding her rhythm machine and making 3 Teens Kill 4 a stripped-down, four-person ensemble. The band's signature style of found-sounds played on hand-held tape recorders, toy instruments, spoken word and multi-vocals, in a pop music context took shape. The low-tech tape sounds achieved the same results as sampling, and tape-looping, which were just starting to enter the pop music genre.

As the band's only released album was getting started, the inclusion of Doug Bressler expanded the instrumentation to actual guitars as well as toys and Casio keyboards. Guitar, bass, keyboard, percussion, tape players, and toys were passed around on stage. Clarinet and flute were also used as was a microphone sewed into a glove, and a can of Beans. The band's performances had an anarchic intensity that relied on ambiance, and surprising sounds, more than actual music.

In 1982, Alan Mace and Bobby Bradley, the managers of the Pyramid Club, financed the self-titled, independently released album, No Motive. A cover of Chaka Khan and Rufus's "Tell Me Something Good" (written by Stevie Wonder), included audio from the newscast of the attempted assassination of Ronald Reagan. 3 Teens Kill 4's deconstructed version was typical of the harsh, reality-based attitude in their songs. Apart from rock clubs, they performed in non-rock venues such as the Civilian Warfare Gallery, Wigstock, and White Columns.

In 1983, Wojnarowicz left 3 Teens Kill 4 to focus on visual art, writing and film-making. He continued to collaborate on various projects with the members of the band before his death in 1992.

In 1984, Bill Gerstel joined the ranks, giving for the band its first drummer. They continued recording and performing for the next three years, sharing the stage with a long list of artists from this era, including DNA, James Chance, Bush Tetras, Soundgarden, Wall of Voodoo, Glenn Branca, Sonic Youth, ESG, Certain General, The Del-Byzanteens, Suicide, and Madonna. The band disbanded in 1987. All of the members continued writing, performing, producing art and recording.

3 Teens Kill 4 reunited in 2010 at the Mudd Club/Club 57/New Wave Vaudeville show at New York's Delancey Street Lounge. That night included the Bush Tetras, Tish and Snooky, the Comateens and Richard Lloyd from Television.

In 2011, a multi-media show of music, dance, film, slides and live art called "In Peace & War: 3 Teens Kill 4" had three nights at New York's Howl Festival. The band was joined on stage by choreographer Ishmael Houston-Jones and Anohni of Anohni and the Johnsons along with numerous other artists, dancers and singers. The rarely seen film Beautiful People by Wojnarowicz was screened.

In 2016, drummer Bill Gerstel died of lung cancer after a long illness.

In 2018, the re-released album No Motive was included as a sound installation at the Whitney Museum's retrospective for David Wojnarowicz called History Keeps Me Awake At Night. The band did their last performance on September 26, 2018, for the closing of the exhibit at the Whitney. The exhibit continued in 2019 in Europe.

Co-founder Brian Butterick (aka Hattie Hathaway) died on January 30, 2019, after a six-month battle with lung cancer.

== Members ==
- Doug Bressler
- Brian Butterick (1956-2019)
- William Gerstel (1951-2016)
- Julie Hair
- Jesse Hultberg
- David Wojnarowicz (1954-1992)

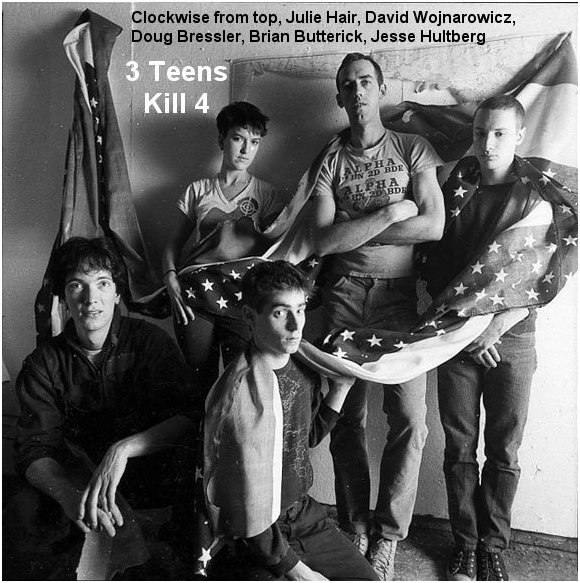

== Discography ==
=== No Motive ===
- Recorded in 1982, released on Pointblank Records.

==== Track listing ====
Side one

1. "Hold Up"
2. "Tell Me Something Good"
3. "5/4"

Side two

1. "Crime Drama"
2. "Hut/Bean Song"
3. "Hunger"

In 1984, the album was re-released in Europe on the French label L'invitation au Suicide. It included a booklet and the additional song "Circumscript" produced by Lefforts Brown.

In June 2017, Not Motive was remastered and re-released on vinyl by Dark Entries Records with three never-before-heard songs, turning the album into a 10-track LP.

Side one

1. "Hold Up"
2. "Tell Me Something Good"
3. "5/4"
4. "Crime Drama"
5. "Stay and Fight"

Side two

1. "Circumscript"
2. "Hut/Bean Song"
3. "Hunger"
4. "Visitation"
5. "Desire"
