= The Innocents (UK band) =

- Origin: England, United Kingdom
- Genres: Punk rock
- Years active: 1978–1980
- Past members: Sarah Hall, Marguerite Van Cook née Martin, Fiona Barry, Greg Van Cook, Susy Hogarth, Jo Hurst, Terry Smith

The Innocents were an English punk rock band, that formed in the spring of 1978 and played frequently with The Clash and The Slits. The original lineup was predominantly female with four women and one male.

The band began when Sarah Hall, (ex-Flowers of Romance) approached Marguerite Martin, later Marguerite Van Cook, in the Vortex Club on Wardour Street in London and invited her to start a band. Sarah Hall borrowed a bass from Paul Simonon of The Clash, and they invited Greg Van Cook, who was in the process of breaking away from the Electric Chairs, to play guitar. Greg Van Cook was an original member of the New York Backstreet Boys of Max's Kansas City, who became The Electric Chairs. He co-authored the punk anthem, "Fuck Off" with Jayne County. The lineup was completed by the addition of Fiona Barry on the piano and Susy Hogarth on drums. They performed self-penned punk songs. The Innocents played gigs at multiple punk friendly venues in London, among them several at Acklam Hall opening for The Slits.

In early November 1978, Sarah Hall asked The Clash if The Innocents could join them on their upcoming "Sort It Out Tour". They agreed and the lineup for the tour was set with the Innocents opening for The Slits and The Clash. The "Sort It Out Tour" began in Scotland and covered stops all over England, though several of the venues were canceled due to ad-hoc town ordinances that banned The Clash in fear of the influence of punk. Including the tour, The Innocents played thirty-one gigs in a row with only a single day's break to end at the tour at the Lyceum.

The DJ on the tour was Barry (Scratch) Myers. These gigs included the Sid Vicious Benefit Gig. They also played with Siouxsie and the Banshees at the Music Machine in London, before the 3 January 1979 date with The Clash, which was added due to an overbooking of the "Sid Vicious Defense Fund" benefit show.

After the tour, Sarah Hall quit the band and was replaced on bass by Jo Hurst. Greg Van Cook joined Front and then The Vibrators, but continued to perform with The Innocents as well, except at the Marquee when The Innocents opened for The Vibrators and Henry Silver played guitar with The Innocents. Terry Smith took over as drummer. The band ended in 1980. Terry Smith was approached by Marguerite to come with them to New York to do a small tour. after three rehearsal's at Halogan's in Holloway Rd where Smith worked. Soon they left for New York, and ended up playing at CBGB for one gig in November. They disbanded soon after. Smith went back to the UK to continue his career as a drummer with The Nipple Erectors, The Barracuddas, and The Temper.

== Recordings ==
The Innocents recorded songs for an EP with Sex Pistols producer and musician, Dave Goodman, but the tapes never were made available to the public. A reported record deal with "Sticky Records" never materialized.
