= Blue Moon (2000 film) =

- Directed by: John A. Gallagher
- Screenplay by: John A. Gallagher
- Story by: Steve Carducci
- Produced by: Sylvia Caminer; Ronnie Shapiro
- Starring: Ben Gazzara; Rita Moreno; Alanna Ubach; Brian Vincent
- Cinematography: Craig DiBona
- Edited by: Naomi Geraghty; Craig McKay
- Music by: Stephen Endelman
- Production company: Paradise Pictures Inc.
- Distributed by: Castle Hill Productions
- Release date: January 16, 2000 (Palm Springs)
- Running time: 89 minutes
- Country: United States
- Language: English

Blue Moon is a 2000 American comedy-drama film directed by John A. Gallagher and starring Ben Gazzara, Rita Moreno, Alanna Ubach, and Brian Vincent.

== Cast ==
- Ben Gazzara as Frank Cavallo
- Rita Moreno as Maggie Cavallo
- Alanna Ubach as Peggy
- Brian Vincent as Mac
- Burt Young as Bobby
- Vincent Pastore as Joey
- Mario Macaluso as Young Jimmy
- Heather Matarazzo as Donna
- Victor Argo as Tony
- David Thornton as Frank's Father
- Lillo Brancato Jr. as Pete
- Shawn Elliott as The Ambassador

== Reception ==
The film has a 20% rating on Rotten Tomatoes.
