= Brian Vincent (director) =

American actor and director (born 1970)

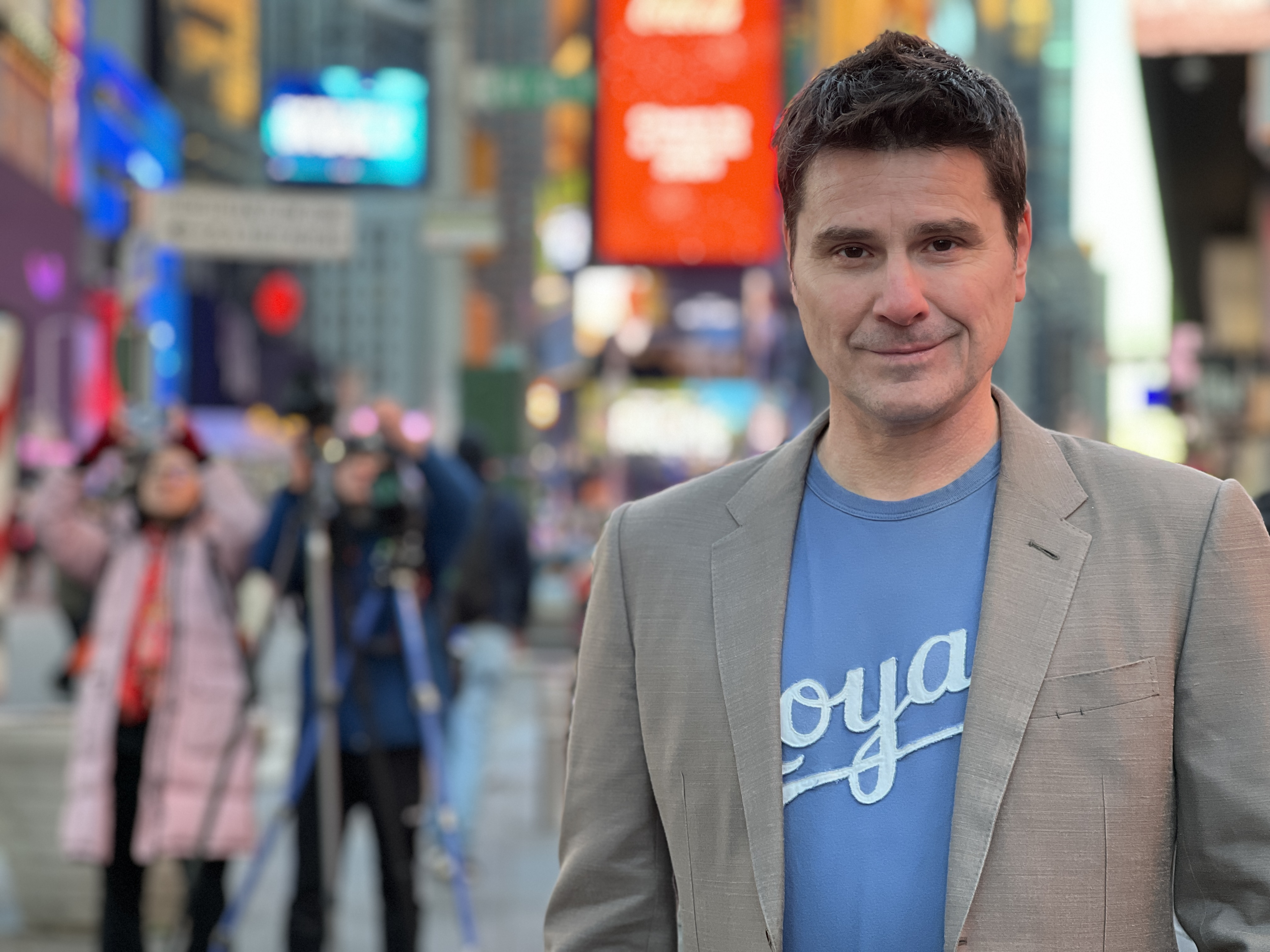
- Born: June 30, 1970 (age 56); Kansas City, Missouri, U.S.
- Education: Emporia State University; Juilliard School (BFA)
- Occupations: Actor, director
- Years active: 1994–present
- Spouse: Heather Spore

Brian Vincent (born June 30, 1970) is an American actor and filmmaker. Since 2018 he has been the executor of the Estate of New York painter Richard Hambleton.

== Acting career ==
Vincent is a graduate of the Juilliard School Group 23. He got his start on the ABC soap opera Loving as Wilson in 1994. He is known as an actor for playing roles in Black Dog (1998), Blue Moon (2000), and the improv comedy The Deli (1997) as Pinky.

Vincent co-wrote the song, "My Greatest Fear", with Randy Travis while on set during filming of Black Dog.

== Directing career ==
Vincent made his directorial debut with the independent documentary, Make Me Famous of which he was also the editor. Make Me Famous had a self-distributed theatrical release. He co-produced the film with wife Heather Spore.

=== Critical response ===
Artforum described Vincent's directorial debut by saying, "...few will be so lucky to have such a competent storyteller as Brian Vincent." The Hollywood Reporter noted, "Brian Vincent's portrait of the East Village painter Edward Brzezinski doubles as an examination of the perils of chasing success." The UK film review site Eye for Film writes, "In telling the story of a man hitherto forgotten by history, director Brian Vincent captures a side of that celebrated scene never seen before, putting all the rest in context and exploring the nature of fame from an unusual perspective."
