= Luis Frangella =

American painter

- Born: July 6, 1944; Buenos Aires, Argentina
- Died: December 7, 1990 (aged 46); New York City, New York, United States
- Education: Universidad de Buenos Aires, MIT
- Movement: post-modern, figurativism, expressionism
- Awards: Guggenheim Fellowship

Luis Frangella (July 6, 1944 – December 7, 1990) was an Argentine figurative post-modern painter and sculptor associated with the expressionist painting of the 1980's East Village art scene of New York City. He received a Guggenheim Fellowship in 1982. He died of AIDS in 1990.

== Education ==
Frangella studied architecture at the University of Buenos Aires (UBA). As an undergraduate student, he obtained a scholarship at the International Association for the Exchange of Students for Technical Experience (IAESTE) to work in Switzerland in urban and regional design. Once there, he was hired by R. Von Senger to work at the villa of musician Herbert von Karajan, in St. Moritz. He travelled through Europe in research journeys to learn more about the work of Max Bill, Le Corbusier, and Alvar Aalto. In Finland he was hired to work in the filming of an advertisement, where he played a mailman.

In 1971 he obtained a scholarship from the University of Buenos Aires, invited by Director of the Center for Advanced Visual Studies and former New Bauhaus professor, György Kepes, to complete his studies in the study in Visual Research at Urban Scale, at the Massachusetts Institute of Technology (M.I.T), in Cambridge. He graduated as an architect from UBA in 1972. He was offered a scholarship at M.I.T between 1973 and 1976, where he finished, along with Maryanne Amacher, protégé of musician John Cage, his work on Spacial Limits, and its relations to Visual Space and Water Drops. In 1976 he moved to New York City where he continued his research in the visual field.

== Life ==
Luis Frangella moved to New York City's East Village in 1976. He exhibited his work at the Gallery of the Senses, in the Wadsworth Atheneum, in Hartford, Connecticut. In 1977 he returned to Buenos Aires where he was awarded the Marcelo de Ridder Award for New Engravings and Drawings in Argentina, at the Museo Nacional de Bellas Artes, for his work La Memoria. Alongside Maryanne Amacher he finished his works No more miles (at the Walker Art Center in Minneapolis); Reflection (at the Center for Advanced Studies of the M.I.T. Workshop for Theatre Dance, in New York, and the Boston Children's Museum); Attransition and Edificios para vestir (at the Institute of Contemporary Art in Boston); and Espacios en dimensiones diferentes (at the Park Project Contest in Florence, Italy). He also collaborated with Russell Sharon to exhibit his work at the Annual Avant Garde Festival in New York.

In 1976, as collaboration with Maryanne Amacher, he worked on Lecture on the Weather by John Cage at the York University in Toronto, Canada, and the Albright-Knox Gallery in Buffalo, New York. That same year he was awarded his first Quality of Life Award in Sculpture, in Cambridge. In 1978 he presented Variations of Latin American Themes at the Center for Inter-American Relations in New York.

In 1982 he obtained the Guggenheim Scholarship. He exhibited his works at art galleries, museums, fairs, nightclubs, and interventions in New York, Buenos Aires, Madrid and Barcelona. In New York he worked with David Wojnarowicz, Mike Bidlo, Keith Haring, and others, showcasing in art galleries such as Civilian Warfare and Hal Bromm Gallery, as well as nightclubs like Danceteria. In Buenos Aires he actively participated in the organization of Pintura Fresca, assembled by Rómulo Macció, Guillermo Kuitca, Eduardo Kusnir, and Felipe Noé, Duilio Pierri, Juan Pablo Ranzi, and Marcia Schvartz. He frequently showcased his performances at the Café Einstein and the Cemento Club in Buenos Aires. In Madrid and Barcelona he exhibited at the Buades and Ciento Galleries, respectively, and participated with an individual stand at Art Basel in 1987.

== Selected exhibitions ==
- 2011 LA JARRA VERTIENTE O MÁQUINA DE DIBUJAR, Fundació Suñol, Barcelona, Spain
- 1990 GROUP OF 16, Museum of Modern Art, Madrid, Spain
- 1989 DRAWINGS, Fundació Joan Miró, Barcelona, Spain
- 1988 EXIT ART PERFORMANCE WITH M. AMACHER, Exit Art, New York
- INAUGURAL EXHIBITION, Buades Gallery, Madrid, Spain
- 1987 New Jersey Museum, Trenton, New Jersey
- 1986 Buades Gallery, Madrid, Spain (solo)
- Eaton-Shoen Gallery, San Francisco, California (solo)
- Civilian Warfare, New York (solo)
- PAINTING & SCULPTURE TODAY, Indianapolis Museum of Art, Indiana
- 1985 Hal Bromm Gallery, New York, "New Sculpture" (group)
- 1985 Hal Bromm Gallery, New York (solo)
- Civilian Warfare, New York (solo)
- 1984 Galeria Ciento, Barcelona, Spain (solo)
- Del Retiro, Buenos Aires, Argentina
- Bar-Bar, Stockholm Sweden
- Civilian Warfare, New York
- 1983 Hal Bromm Gallery, New York (solo)
- 1982 Alberto Elia, Buenos Aires, Argentina (solo)
- 1981 Galeria Buades, Madrid, Spain (solo)
- Galeria Ciento, Barcelona, Spain (solo)
