= Civilian Warfare Gallery =

Art gallery in New York City

Civilian Warfare Gallery was an art gallery located in New York City's East Village in the early 1980s and was one of the founding galleries of the East Village art movement. Founded by artists Alan Barrows and Dean Savard, the gallery helped launch the careers of notable artists including David Wojnarowicz, Richard Hambleton, Luis Frangella, Greer Lankton, the Grey Organisation/Toby Mott and Jane Bauman among others.

== History ==
Civilian Warfare Gallery
- Civilian Warfare
- Founders: Alan Barrows (1954-); Dean Savard (1958-1990)
- Founded at: New York City, New York, USA

Originally founded as Civilian Warfare Studio in Dean Savard's storefront live/work painting studio at 526 East 11th Street, between Avenues A and B in the East Village, casual salons held with friends eventually led to the formation of a formal art gallery in 1982. After initial success in the small storefront, the gallery moved to a larger space at 155 Avenue B at 10th Street across from Tompkins Square Park in September of 1984. A move to an even larger third location at 614 East 9th Street between Avenues B and C followed in November 1986.
