= Andrew Cornell Robinson =

American artist and designer (born 1968)

- Born: 1968 (age 57–58); New Jersey
- Education: Glasgow School of Art
- Known for: Visual Art; Sculpture; Ceramics
- Awards: Edward F. Albee Foundation Fellow

Andrew Cornell Robinson (born 1968) is an American artist and designer. He is based in New York City.

== Career ==
Robinson's work spans various media from ceramics and painting to printmaking and sculpture. His work combines humor, history, and sculptural forms and transforms ceramics into a very contemporary medium. Robinson's sculpture explores memory and narrative through a sublime handling of materials and contrasts this with eccentric forms that touch upon personal and socio-political content through the use of craft and assemblage materials.

Robinson's work is in private and public collections and has been exhibited widely at galleries and museums such as David & Schwietzer Contemporary, Christopher Stout Gallery, Anna Kustera Gallery and Paul Sharpe Projects, Eyelevel BQE Gallery in New York City, and the Ross Museum in Ohio, Baltimore Contemporary Museum, Saint Joseph's University Gallery and the Aldrich Museum of Art. His work has been featured in presentations by the Craft Council of the United Kingdom, Clay in the East at the Virginia Commonwealth University and the American Center for Design in Chicago. He has written art criticism and essays for Sculpture Magazine, ArtCat, and The Gay City News. He was a founding member of the board of directors of the Foucault Society in the United States. He has received awards from Cannes for digital media work and fellowships from The Edward Albee Foundation in 2010.

His work has been the subject of reviews and essays by Frank Holliday, Hrag Vartanian and Zane Wilson. Wilson wrote about Robinson's work "Andrew Robinson’s work overlaps themes of multiple cultures, sexual identity, an absence of historical presence, political awareness executed through careful nods to art history through the genuine invention of beautifully crafted objects."

He teaches at Parsons The New School for Design in New York City, where he is an assistant professor.

== Early life and education ==
Born in 1968 in New Jersey, United States. Robinson studied at the Maryland Institute College of Art (MICA) in Baltimore, Maryland and received a B.F.A. in Ceramics in 1991. In 1994, he received a M.F.A. in Sculpture from the School of Visual Arts in New York City.
