= Hal Bromm =

American art dealer (born 1947)

Hal Bromm (born June 6, 1947) is an American art dealer, designer, architect, curator and preservationist. He is the owner of Hal Bromm Art & Design and Hal Bromm Gallery in New York City.

== Career ==
A graduate of the Pratt Institute, Bromm's background includes art history, environmental design, architecture, photography, lighting theory and engineering as well as other disciplines. In 1975, Bromm began showing art as an extension to the design business at 10 Beach Street in Tribeca. In 1976 the gallery opened a new exhibition space on Franklin Street, establishing Tribeca's first contemporary gallery. In 1977, the gallery relocated to its current location at 90 West Broadway. Hal Bromm Gallery features contemporary art by sculptors, painters, photographers and installation artists. Early on, the gallery featured works by Rosemarie Castoro, Krzysztof Wodiczko, David Salle, Robert Longo, Joe Zucker, among others. Bromm presented Keith Haring’s first solo exhibition in 1981. In the early 1980s, Bromm opened a second gallery at 170 Avenue A in New York's East Village. Exhibitions there featured many emerging artists including David Wojnarowicz, Luis Frangella, Mike Bidlo, Russell Sharon, and Judy Glantzman.
