= The Bronx Kill =

Graphic novel

- Cover to The Bronx Kill by Lee Bermejo.
- Date: March 2010
- Series: Vertigo Crime
- Page count: 184 pages
- Publisher: Vertigo

Creative team
- Writers: Peter Milligan
- Artists: James Romberger
- Letterers: Clem Robins
- Creators: Peter Milligan; James Romberger
- Editors: Karen Berger; Pornsak Pichetshote
- ISBN: 1401211550

The Bronx Kill is a 2010 graphic novel published as part of the "Vertigo Crime" line from Vertigo, a DC Comics imprint. The writer is Peter Milligan, with art by James Romberger. The Bronx Kill is illustrated in grey-scale. It is done in the fashion of the "film noir"/detective-crime style.

== Plot synopsis ==
The story centers around main character, Martin Keane. His father is a New York City cop, as well as his grandfather and his great-grandfather, after whom, Martin is named. Martin's grandfather was mysteriously killed while alone in a dock area called "Bronx Kill". The murder has haunted Martin's family for years. Martin is also plagued by his grandmother's disappearance. Despite Martin's father pushing him to be a cop, Martin becomes a writer; this is part of the reason Martin and his father have such a strained relationship. Martin's wife, Erin, disappears within the first quarter of the story, driving the rest of the plot.

=== Martin's novel ===
Within the Bronx Kill, Martin is writing a novel about an Irishman named Michael Furey, who moves to America once he has discovered that his family has been murdered, most likely by his brother, Hugh. Peter Milligan actually inserts excerpts of Martin's mystery/crime novel within the graphic novel, with annotations as if Michael were still in the process of writing the novel. The events in the novel often happen to parallel Michael's own life events, eerily enough. The novel excerpts appear on pages: 38-39, 47-48, 64-65, 86-89, 114-115, 154-155, and 177-179 of The Bronx Kill. Many of Martin's tales center on a fragile father-son relationship because he is trying to work out his own strained relationship to his father.

== Characters ==
- Martin Keane: main character
- Erin: Martin's wife
- Mr. Keane: Martin's dad
- Elder Martin Keane: Martin's grandfather
- Nora: Martin's grandmother
- Kerry: Martin's long lost cousin- share grandmother Nora
- Armquist: detective who suspects Martin of Erin's murder
- Brian: Martin's literary agent
