= Cynthia Carr =

American writer

Cynthia Carr is an American writer who has contributed to a number of periodicals, including The Village Voice and Artforum. She often publishes under the byline C. Carr.

== Biography ==
Carr graduated from the University of Iowa in 1972 with an honors degree in English. She went on to work as a freelance writer for several years, and then as a staff writer for The Village Voice from 1987 to 2003, where she specialized in arts coverage. "On Edge," her column for The Village Voice, chronicled New York's downtown performance scene, including such then-emerging artists as Linda Montano, Tehching Hsieh, Marina Abramović, and Ulay. She also wrote about performance art and culture for Artforum, LA Weekly, Interview and Mirabella.

Her 2012 biography of artist and AIDS activist David Wojnarowicz, Fire in the Belly, has been called one of the most important books of the year for its meticulous analysis of Wojnarowicz's prominent role at the intersection of gay history and art history in late 20th century America. The book won a Lambda Literary Award in 2013 in the category of Gay Memoir or Biography.

In 2024, Carr released Candy Darling: Dreamer, Icon, Superstar, a biographical portrait of Candy Darling, queer icon and Warhol superstar.

== Books ==
- Our Town: A Heartland Lynching, a Haunted Town, and the Hidden History of White America (2007)
- On Edge: Performance at the End of the Twentieth Century (2012)
- Fire in the Belly: The Life and Times of David Wojnarowicz (2012)
- Candy Darling: Dreamer, Icon, Superstar (2024)

== Awards ==
- Guggenheim Fellowship (2007)
