= Marcia Schvartz =

Argentine artist (born 1955)

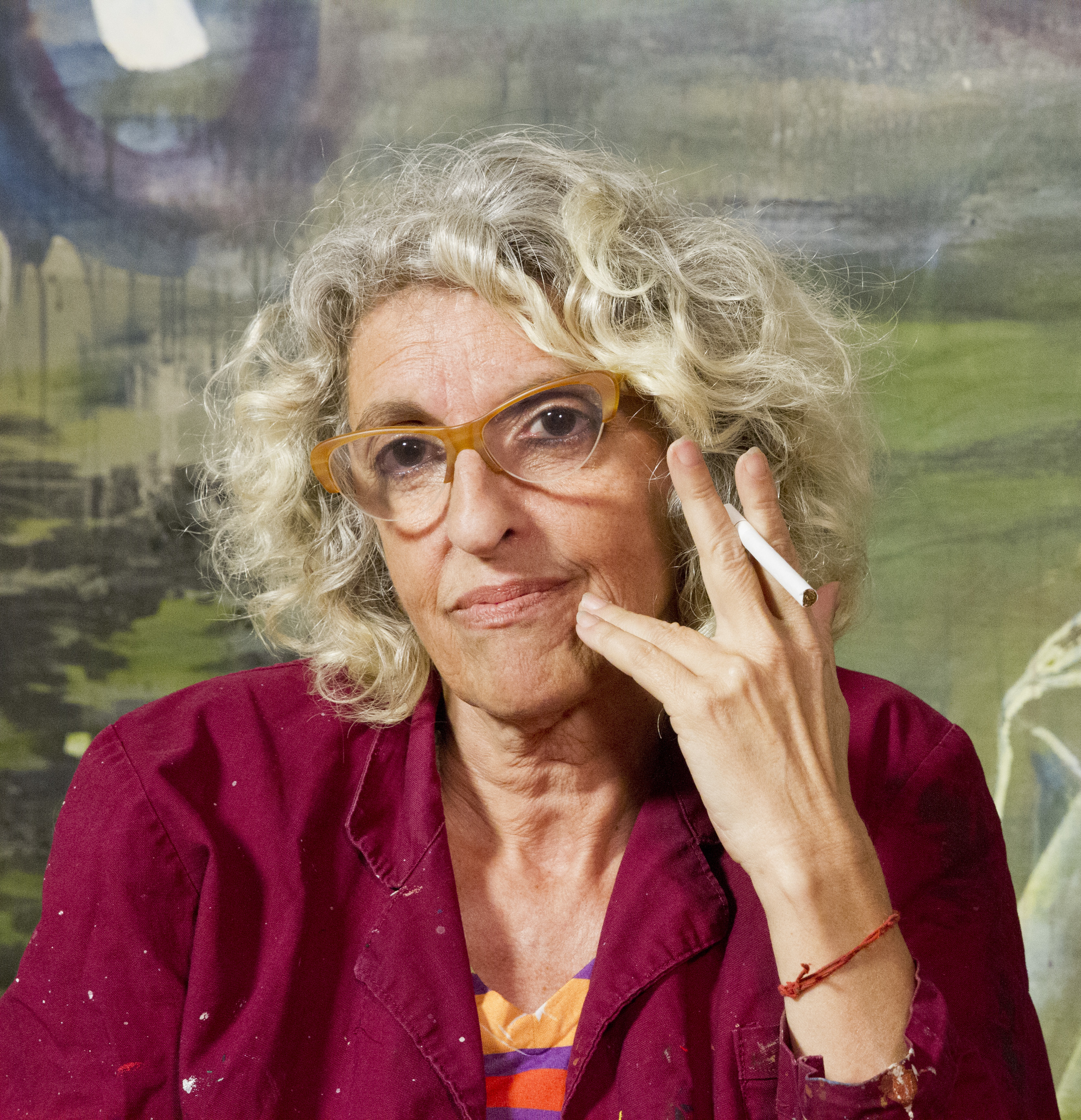
Schvartz in 2015

Marcia Schvartz (born March 24, 1955) is an Argentinian painter, illustrator and ceramic artist primarily known for her feminist figurative paintings.

== Early life and education ==
Marcia Schvartz was born March 24, 1955, in Buenos Aires, to progressive parents. Schvartz's mother, named Hebe Clementi, was both a historian and professor. Clementi wrote extensively about indigenous culture and critiqued chattel slavery. Her father Gregorio Schvartz owned a notable bookstore. His bookstore was known for lending books to those who could not afford to buy them.

From the time she was young, Schvartz created art. In 1970, she began studying art at the Escuela de Bellas Artes Manuel Belgrano. Schvartz was introduced to Aída Carballo here. Carballo became an influential mentor and teacher in Schvartz's early life. Schvartz left the Escuela de Bellas Artes Manuel Belgrano before graduating. In the 1970s, Schvartz was a member of the Peronist Youth movement. In 1976, the leftist leader Isabel Perón was overthrown in a coup. In 1979, during this time of civil unrest Schvartz self-exiled to Spain after the disappearance of her best friend in 1977.

Schvartz's work is heavily influenced by the disappearances during the aftermath of the coup of Isabel Perón and by the tragedies of the AIDS crisis, both of which Schvartz lost friends to. In 1983, Schvartz returned to Argentina.

== Work ==
Schvartz has received recognition and has shown her work around the world. Schvartz has remained living in Argentina after her return in 1983.

== Art and exhibitions ==
- De Cara Al Futuro (Looking to the Future), 2010 Oil on canvas. 143x 103 cm.
  - Painting included in Schvartz's first US retrospective. A self portrait exploring the cruelty of female aging, painted in a grotesque feminist style.
- Marcia Schvartz: Works, 1976 – 2018 Bortolami, Kaufmann Repetto, and Andrew Kreps Gallery, 55 Walker Street New York, 2021
  - First US retrospective and survey of Schvartz's work.
