= Edward Brezinski =

American artist

- Edward Brezinski at Club 57, 1981
- Born: Edward Brzezinski; 1954; Michigan, United States
- Died: 2007 (aged 52–53); Cannes, France
- Known for: Painting
- Movement: East Village

Edward Brezinski (1954–2007) was an American artist who, in the 1980s, became a painter in the East Village arts scene. He is the subject of the documentary Make Me Famous.

== Early life ==
Brezinski was raised in Michigan, possibly in Chesterfield Township. He was born with the last name Brzezinski, and was the only child of his parents. His mother died when he was a teenager, and his father worked for General Motors.

After leaving Michigan, Brezinski first moved to San Francisco, where he attended the San Francisco Institute of Art.

He eventually ended up in Manhattan's Lower East Side.

== Later life ==
Brezinski lived in Berlin in the 1990s.

Brezinski died in Cannes, France in 2007.
