= Jane Bauman =

American artist

- Occupations: Painter, sculptor, and academic

Academic background
- Education: Santa Clara University; San Francisco Art Institute
- Website: Jane Bauman's Website

Jane Bauman is an American painter, sculptor, and academic. She has been a professor and Chair of the Visual and Performing Art Department at Coastline Community College in Newport Beach, California. As a working artist, she is very active in the Southern California art scene.

== Early life and education ==
Bauman was born in Burbank, California and grew up in Los Angeles where surf culture, the 60’s hippie movement, psychedelic music and the Hollywood movie industry had a formative influence on her artistic development.

== Career ==
Bauman received her Bachelor’s degree from Santa Clara University in 1973. She then enrolled at San Francisco Art Institute and earned her Master of Fine Arts degree in 1980. Shortly after graduating from SFAI, she moved to New York City and became very active in the East Village art scene. She also took an interest in the punk/no wave culture of the late 1970s and began to do her first street art as well as making paintings and sculptures. She created the cover for the Tellus Audio Cassette Magazine issue #10 All Guitars!.

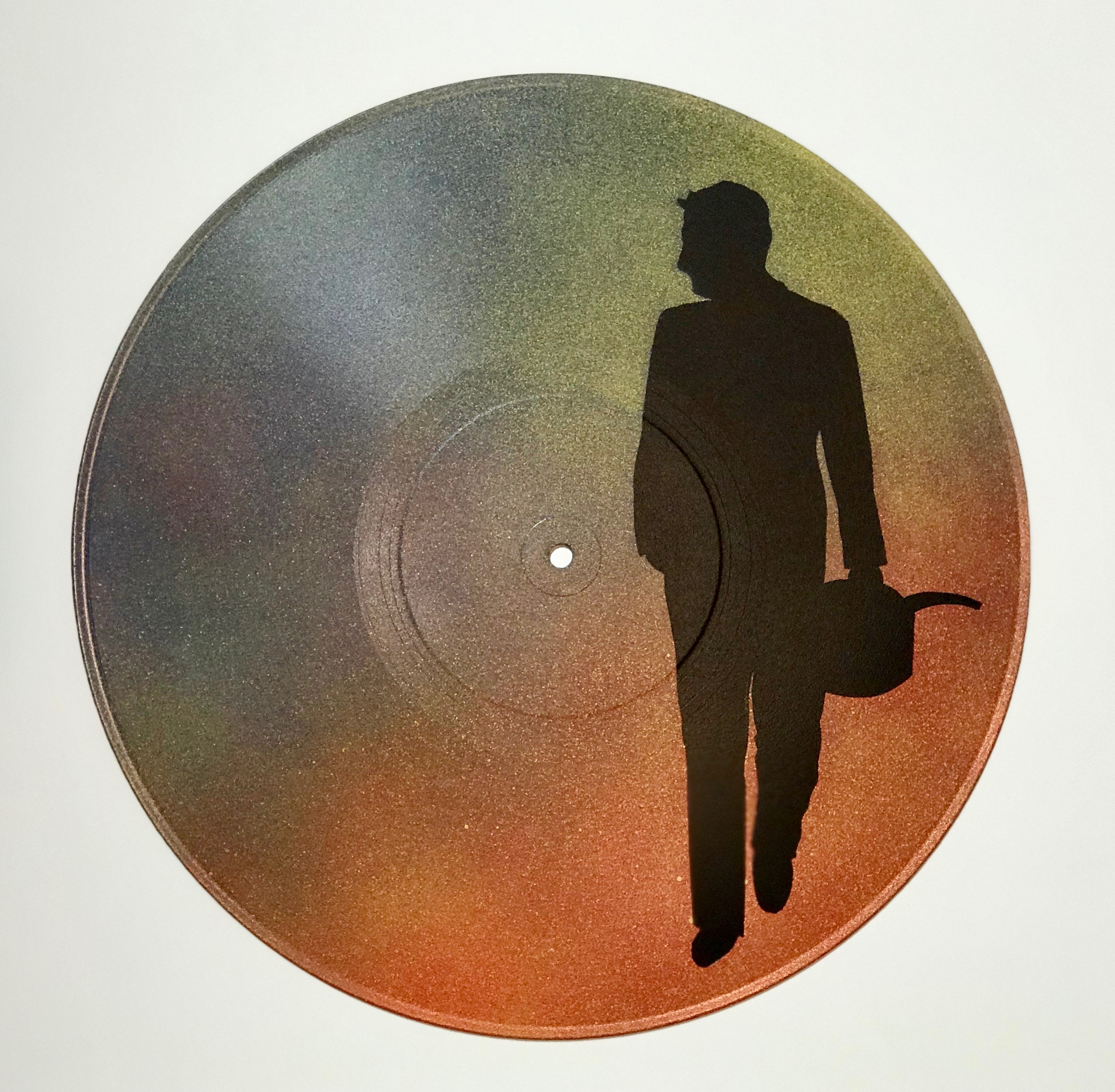
Out of Gas by Jane Bauman

In 1988, Bauman left New York and moved back to California where she became a full professor and Chair of the Visual and Performing Art Department at Coastline College in Newport Beach. From 2003 through 2013, she taught six Study Abroad Programs in Florence, Italy which had a big impact on her art.

== Works ==
Bauman’s artworks are based on decay, quick application, and associations with outlaw graffiti and subcultures. In her paintings, she uses commercial spray paints for their bright colors. The distinguishing characteristic of her work is the sharp-edge of her stenciled images. She collaborated on several art projects with Mark C. (of Live Skull). Their first collaboration was a series of painted records and album covers satirizing corporate music. Their second collaboration was a series of painted photographs that were exhibited at Civilian Warfare Gallery in 1986.

Her work was included by Tricia Collins and Richard Milazzo in the Collins & Milazzo exhibition Natural Genre: From the Neutral Subject to the Hypothesis of World Objects in 1984 at the Florida State University Gallery and Museum. Also Bauman was a participant in the Pier 34 graffiti project that was documented by Andreas Sterzing in 1983/84. Her art is in public collections, including The Cooper-Hewitt, Museum of American Art, The Musee de Cloitre des Cordeliers, and The Thomas Armann Foundation.

Jack Johnston grouped her ceramics into two categories: cast pieces and hand-formed shapes.

In 2011, Genie Davis praised Bauman’s artworks and regarded her as one of the well-known artists of the time. Eric Minh Swenson filmed her artworks in the form of a documentary describing Bauman’s different painting styles. In 1993, Bauman attended OC Forum and focused on the discussion of How the Arts Can Help in the AIDS Crisis, which was featured in the Los Angeles Times.

=== Selected artworks ===
- East Village Art, 1980s
- Backwards America, 1980
- Red Phone, 1980
- Falling Man and Statue of Liberty, 1981
- Skyline, 1981
- Big Volcano, 1981
- Dark House, 1979-1981
- Not OK, 1983
- Sighting Mothra, 2011
- Apophenia, 2016
- Remnant/Detritus, 2018
- FloraBau, 2015-2018
- Dante's Inferno

=== Selected exhibitions ===
- ClampArt Gallery, "Empty Stencils: The Street Art of Jane Bauman, David Wojnarowicz, and Artists From Civilian Warfare Gallery", NYC, 2020
- LGBT Advocate & Gochis Galleries, "Let Me Come Home", Los Angeles, CA 2019
- Brooklyn Waterfront Artists Coalition, "Painting to Survive: 1985 – 95", NYC, NY 2018
- 4th Element Gallery, "FloraBau", solo exhibition, Santa Ana, CA 2018
- Hunter College Art Gallery, "Something Possible Everywhere, Pier 34", NYC, NY 2016
- Brett Rubbico Gallery, "Sighting Mothra", solo exhibition, Newport Beach, CA, 2013
- At Space Gallery, "Apophenia", solo exhibition, Santa Ana, CA 2009
- Chapman University Guggenheim Gallery, "Beyond Abstraction", Orange, CA 2008
- At Space Gallery, "True Hallucinations", solo exhibition, Santa Ana, CA 2007
- Turner Carroll Gallery, "Works on Metal", Santa Fe, NM 2004
- Terrain Gallery, "Jane Bauman", solo exhibitions, San Francisco, CA 1988 & 1989
- Civilian Warfare Gallery, "Jane Bauman – Mark C: Photo/Painting Collab", NYC, NY 1986
- Holly Solomen Gallery, "Selected Artists from the East Village", NYC, NY 1985
- Anna Freibe Gallery, "Jane Bauman/Huck Snyder", Cologne, Germany 1984
- University Art Museum Santa Barbara, “NeoYork", Santa Barbara, CA 1984
- Gallery Engstrum, "Twelve Women From New York", Stockholm, Sweden 1984
- Civilian Warfare Gallery, "Jane Bauman" solo exhibitions, NYC, NY 1984 & 1985
- American Graffiti Gallery, "The Best of the East Village", Amsterdam, Holland 1983
- White Columns, "Speed Trials", NYC, NY 1982
