= A Fire in My Belly =

Unfinished film directed by David Wojnarowicz

- Directed by: David Wojnarowicz
- Running time: 21 minutes
- Country: United States
- Language: Silent

A Fire in My Belly is an unfinished American avant-garde film directed by David Wojnarowicz.

== Description ==
A Fire in My Belly comprises two sections, the first 13 minutes in duration and the second 7 minutes. The longer section begins with a panning shot of a town, taken from a moving car. A sequence of newspaper articles describe violent crimes. Scenes of intense violence alternate between a bullfight, a cockfight, and a wrestling match.

The shorter section opens with the image of spinning wheels. It leads into pairs of repeated images: beggars and police officers, sugar skulls and a painting of a human sacrifice, and mummies and a tombstone.

== Production ==
Wojnarowicz shot A Fire in My Belly from 1986 to 1987. Its production happened during a turning point in his career, as his partner Peter Hujar died from AIDS in 1987 and Wojnarowicz tested positive for HIV. Wojnarowicz primarily filmed in Mexico, with additional scenes at his apartment in New York. He shot it on 8 mm film.

== Release ==
=== "Hide/Seek: Difference and Desire in American Portraiture" ===
A Fire in My Belly was included with dozens of other American works in a 2010 National Portrait Gallery exhibition called "Hide/Seek: Difference and Desire in American Portraiture". The gallery transferred the film to video and edited it down to a four-minute excerpt. For the audio track, they used a recording from an ACT UP demonstration.

In November 2010, after consultation with National Portrait Gallery director Martin Sullivan and co-curator David C. Ward but not co-curator Jonathan David Katz, Smithsonian Institution Secretary G. Wayne Clough removed the film from the exhibition in response to complaints from the Catholic League, U.S. House Minority Leader John Boehner, Representative Eric Cantor and the possibility of reduced federal funding for the Smithsonian. The video contains a scene with a crucifix covered in ants. William Donohue of the Catholic League claimed the work was "hate speech" against Catholics. Gay historian Jonathan Ned Katz wrote:

In 1989 Senator Jesse Helms demonized Robert Mapplethorpe's sexuality, and by extension, his art, and with little effort pulled a cowering art world to its knees. His weapon was threatening to disrupt the already pitiful federal support for the arts, and once again, that same weapon is being brandished, and once again we cower.

==== Response from Clough and Smithsonian ====
Clough later said that although he stood by his decision, it "might have been made too quickly", and called the decision "painful." He said that because of the controversy surrounding the footage and the possibility that it might "spiral out of control", the Smithsonian might have been forced to shut down the entire "Hide/Seek" exhibition, and that was "something he didn't want to happen." The "Hide/Seek" exhibition "examined representations of homosexuality in American portraiture", and Clough said, "The funders and people who were upset by the decision—and I respect that—still have an appreciation that this exhibition is up. We were willing to take this topic on when others were not, and people appreciate that."

I think it was very important to cut off the dialogue that was headed towards, in essence, hijacking the exhibit away from us and putting it into the context of religious desecration. This continues to be a powerful exhibit about the contributions of gay and lesbian artists. It was not about religious iconography and it was not about desecration. When you look at the news cycles that take over, their [the show's critics'] megaphones are this big [making a broad gesture] and our megaphone is this big [a small gesture]. We don't control that. And when it gets out of control, you can't get it back.

— G. Wayne Clough

Clough added, "But looking back, sure, I wish I had taken more time. We have a lot of friends who felt left out. We needed to spend more time letting our friends know where this was going. I regret that."

The video work was shown intact when "Hide/Seek" moved to the Tacoma Art Museum.

==== Response from the art world and the public ====
The curator David C. Ward defended the artwork, saying, "It is not anti-religion or sacrilegious. It is a powerful use of imagery".

In response, The Andy Warhol Foundation, which had provided a $100,000 grant to the exhibition, announced that it would not fund future Smithsonian projects.

On December 2, 2010, protesters against the censorship marched from the Transformer Gallery to the National Portrait Gallery. The work was projected on the building. On December 5, activists Michael Blasenstein and Michael Dax Iacovone were detained and barred from the gallery for holding leaflets.

On December 9, National Portrait Gallery Commissioner James T. Bartlett resigned in protest. The artist AA Bronson sought to withdraw his art from the exhibit, with support from the lending institution, the National Gallery of Canada, but was unsuccessful. The curators appeared at a forum at the New York Public Library. A protest was held from the Metropolitan Museum of Art to the Cooper Hewitt Museum.

On December 15, a panel discussion was held at the Museum of Fine Arts, Houston. On December 20, a panel discussion was held at the Washington, D.C. Jewish Community Center. On January 20, 2011, the Center of Study of Political Graphics held a protest at the Los Angeles Museum of Contemporary Art.

Clough issued a statement standing by the decision, spoke at a Town Hall Los Angeles meeting, and appeared at a public forum on April 26–27, 2011.

Several Smithsonian curators criticized the decision, as did critics, with Newsweek arts critic Blake Gopnik going so far as to call the complaints "gay bashing" and not a legitimate public controversy.

=== Later exhibitions ===
After the Smithsonian controversy, several institutions including the San Francisco Museum of Modern Art and the Tate Modern scheduled showings of the removed work. A Fire in My Belly has since been included in a retrospective at the Whitney Museum covering Wojnarowicz's work. Tatxo Benet added the video to his Censored Art Collection. It is displayed at the Museu de l'Art Prohibit in Barcelona, Spain.
