= Peggy Cyphers =

American painter (born 1954)

Peggy Cyphers (born 1954) is an American painter, printmaker, professor, curator, and art writer. Cyphers was a formative figure in the East Village art scene during the 1980s, and has had her work exhibited in the United States and Europe since then.

== Biography ==
Cyphers grew up in Baltimore and Chesapeake Beach, Maryland and has been inspired by the Miocene fossil deposits, Calvert Cliffs and aquatic life of the Bay since childhood. She received her BFA from Towson University and also attended the Maryland Institute College of Art.

Upon moving to New York in 1977, she studied painting at the Pratt Institute and received an MFA with a Ford Foundation Award. Cyphers became a part of the East Village art scene in the 1980s, and exhibited her first major series of work “Modern Fossils.”

Cyphers is a tenured adjunct professor of painting at the Pratt Institute. At Pratt, her former students include Mickalene Thomas. Cyphers mentored Thomas and encouraged her to apply to graduate school at Yale University. She has also taught at New York University; Parsons; University of North Carolina, Greensboro; Royal Academy of Art Helsinki; Lahti Polytechnic Institute, Lahti, Finland; School of Visual Arts; and New York School of Interior Design. She has taught in the Pratt in Venice and Tuscany Programs.

Since 1988, Cyphers’ critical writings have appeared in such publications as Painters on Paintings, Art Journal, Arts Magazine, Tema Celeste, A Gathering of the Tribes, New Observations, Cover, The Thing.net, and Resolve40, as well as catalog essays for museums and galleries.

Cyphers has been a resident artist at Tong Xian Art Residency, Beijing, Santa Fe Art Institute, International Studio Program NYC, ArtOmi, Yaddo and Triangle Artists Workshop.

In addition to showing her own art, Cyphers has curated exhibitions at Exit Art, Solo Impressions, and Creon, among other venues.

== Artwork ==
Roberta Smith writing in The New York Times, said that Cyphers paints "in an effortless style that corrupts and complicates the staining technique originated by Color Field painters like Helen Frankenthaler with various ideas in the air: notational, pattern-prone motifs, landscape references and allusions to textiles and fabric. The plants are still here, but now they are usually soft blooms and plumes of color that also suggest, with a little help from the titles, wet pavement, blurry stop lights or even the Brooklyn Bridge."

Some of Cyphers’ notable series of paintings and works on paper include:

"Lexicons of Paradise"

Influenced by Darwinian evolutionary theory, Cyphers created a series of naturalistic themed paintings called "Lexicons of Paradise" in the early 1990's. These paintings explore human nature through painterly vignettes. Each painting has a portion of its surface covered by diamond dust.

“Animal Spirits”

After extensive travel, which included a residence at the Tong Xian Arts Center in Beijing, China, Cyphers completed a series of paintings reflecting the relationship between sentient creatures and geological or natural phenomena. These paintings draw from scientific and cultural references, such as Pliny’s Natural History, Chinese landscape paintings, and Native American traditions, which she expressed through gestural brushwork and the use of natural, textured materials like sand and gold.

"Prairie Conversation"

During a residency at the Grin City Collective in Grinnell, Iowa, in the spring of 2013, Cyphers began a project titled “Prairie Conversation,” a series of prints about the hundreds of plant species found in Iowa’s prairie, researched using the specimens and extensive archive at Grinnell College’s herbarium.

“Future Byzantium”

Cyphers’ interpretation of Byzantine mosaics is reflected in a series of gold-toned paintings she made with quasi-religious light that evokes the aesthetic of the early Italian Renaissance.

== Exhibitions ==
Cyphers’ work has been exhibited in 30 solo exhibitions and over 180 group exhibitions. Cyphers is represented by Front Room Gallery in Hudson, New York. Her most recent show in 2024 was at the Front Room Gallery in Hudson, titled Passages. The exhibition was reviewed in Whitehot Magazine and Art Spiel.

Notable venues that have exhibited her work include the Museum of Modern Art (New York, NY) E. M. Donahue Gallery (New York, NY), Cross Contemporary Art, Noma Gallery (San Francisco, CA), New York Academy of Sciences (New York, NY), Rhode Island College (Providence, RI), William Patterson College (Wayne, NJ), Galerie Asbeck (Copenhagen), Haines Gallery (San Francisco, CA), Betsy Rosenfield (Chicago, IL), M13 (New York, NY), Limbo Gallery, Ground Zero Gallery (New York, NY), the Proposition (New York, NY), Kleinert James Art Center (Woodstock, NY), Creon Gallery (New York, NY), Mincher Wilcox (San Francisco, CA), and Art Gallery at the University of Hawai‘i at Mānoa (Honolulu, HI).

Her first one-person show, titled Modern Fossils, was held at M13 Gallery in 1984.

Cyphers’ 1987 exhibition, Natural Selection at Ground Zero Gallery featured paintings like Origin of Species, which symbolically visualize Charles Darwin’s naturalist writing and research.

Cyphers’ exhibitions have received numerous reviews from art critics in publications including Artforum, New Criterion, Vogue, the San Francisco Chronicle and the Chicago Tribune.

Art writer Demetria Daniels said to Artnet editor Walter Robinson about the works in Cypher's 2003 solo exhibition at the Proposition that "they're warm and loving".

Her 2012 New York exhibition Animal Spirits at The Proposition Gallery was reviewed in Art in America, and The Brooklyn Rail. Jonathan Goodman wrote in The Brooklyn Rail that, "Peggy Cyphers has put on a show of startling originality at the Proposition, located nearby the New Museum on the Lower East Side. The artist, who has more than three decades of experience living and working in New York, calls the exhibition Animal Spirits, in reference to the creatures symbolized by feathers or fur or claws in her compositions."

== Awards and accolades ==
Cyphers has been awarded numerous grants and honors for her paintings. In 2022, Cyphers was awarded the Distinguished Alumni Award from Towson University. She has also received the Peter S. Reed Foundation Grant (2011), Pratt Institute Faculty Fund Award (2011, 2001), Elizabeth Foundation for the Arts (1997), National Studio Award, PS.1 Clocktower (1991), National Endowment for the Arts Award in Painting (1989) and the Igor Foundation Award (1987).

== Museum holdings and collections ==
Cyphers’ artworks are in the following public collections: the Columbia Museum of Art (Columbia, SC), Cedar Rapids Museum of Art (Cedar Rapids, IA), University Museum, Southern Illinois University (Carbondale, IL), Seattle Art Museum (Seattle, WA), among other national arts institutions. Cyphers’ had several paintings in Herbert and Dorothy Vogel’s noted contemporary art collection. In 2008, the Vogel’s launched The Dorothy and Herbert Vogel Collection: Fifty Works for Fifty States, which placed four of Cyphers’ paintings (Galaxy's Empire, Last Look, Natural Love, and Psyche’s World) in museum collections across the United States.
