= Krzysztof Wodiczko =

Polish artist (born 1943)

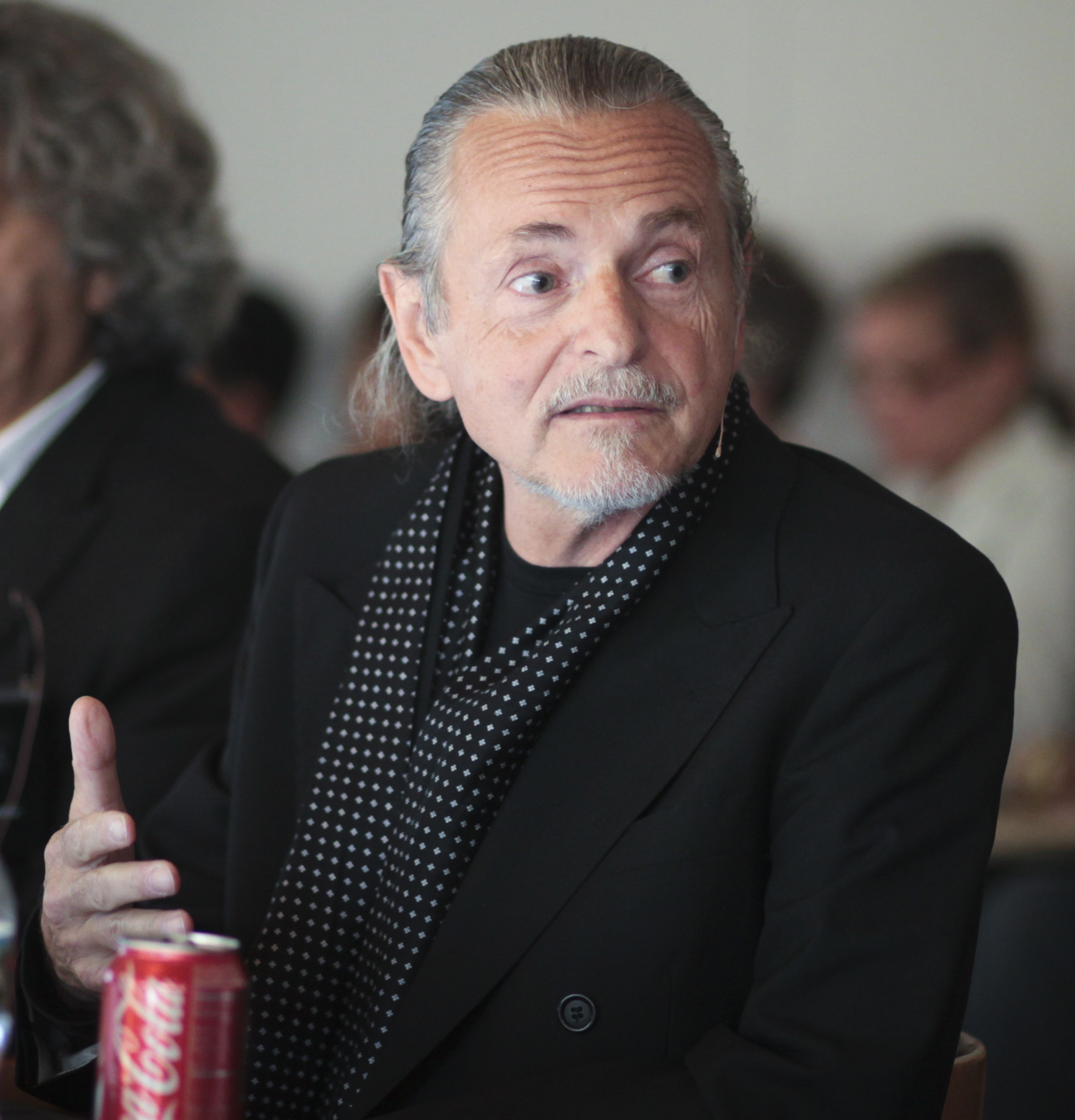
- Wodiczko in 2009
- Born: 1943 (age 82–83); Warsaw, Poland
- Occupations: Industrial designer, tactical media artist
- Years active: 1968–present

Krzysztof Wodiczko (born April 16, 1943) is a Polish artist known for his large-scale slide and video projections on architectural facades and monuments. He has realized more than 80 such public projections in Australia, Austria, Canada, England, Germany, Holland, Ireland, Israel, Italy, Japan, Mexico, Poland, Spain, Switzerland, and the United States.

War, conflict, trauma, memory, and communication in the public sphere are some of the major themes of his work. His practice, known as Interrogative Design, combines art and technology as a critical design practice in order to highlight marginal social communities and add legitimacy to cultural issues that are often given little design attention.

He lives and works in New York City and teaches in Cambridge, Massachusetts, where he is currently professor in residence of art and the public domain for the Harvard Graduate School of Design (GSD). Wodiczko was formerly director of the Interrogative Design Group at the Massachusetts Institute of Technology (MIT) where he was a professor in the Visual Arts Program since 1991. He also teaches as visiting professor in the Psychology Department at the Warsaw School of Social Psychology.

== Early life ==
Wodiczko, son of Polish orchestra conductor Bohdan Wodiczko, as well having a Jewish mother, was born in 1943 during the Warsaw Ghetto Uprising and grew up in post-war communist Poland. In 1967 while still a student at the Academy of Fine Arts in Warsaw, he began collaborating with director Jozef Patkowski and the Experimental Studio on sound performances. He graduated in 1968 with an M.F.A. degree in industrial design and worked for the next two years at UNITRA, Warsaw, designing popular electronic products. From 1970 until his emigration to Canada in 1977, he designed professional optical, mechanical, and electronic instruments at the Polish Optical Works.

In 1969, Wodiczko collaborated with Andrzej Dluzniewski and Wojciech Wybieralski on a design proposal for a memorial to victims of Majdanek concentration camp in Poland. He also performed with Personal Instrument in the streets of Warsaw and participated in the Biennale de Paris as a leader of a group architectural project. He was a teaching assistant for two years, 1969–70, in the Basic Design Program at the Academy of Fine Arts before moving to the Warsaw Polytechnic Institute, where he taught until 1976. Throughout the 1970s he continued his collaborations on sound and music performances with various musicians and artists.

In 1971, Wodiczko began work on Vehicle, which he tested the following year on the streets of Warsaw. In 1972 he created his first solo installation: Corridor at Galeria Wspolczesna, Warsaw. The following year he began exhibiting with Galeria Foksal, Warsaw. In 1975, Wodiczko traveled for the first time to the United States where he was artist-in-residence at the University of Illinois, Urbana and exhibited at N.A.M.E. Gallery, Chicago. He participated again in the Biennale de Paris, this time as a solo artist.

In 1976, Wodiczko began a two-year artist-in-residence program at the Nova Scotia College of Art and Design in Halifax, Nova Scotia, Canada. He emigrated from Poland in 1977, establishing residency in Canada teaching at the University of Guelph in Ontario, and began working with New York art dealer Hal Bromm, at whose Tribeca gallery Wodiczko's first US exhibition was presented in 1977. In 1979 he taught at the Ontario College of Art in Toronto and continued teaching at the Nova Scotia College of Art and Design until 1981. From 1981 to 1982 he was artist in residence at the South Australian School of Art (currently part of the University of South Australia in Adelaide). In 1983, Wodiczko established residency in New York City teaching at the New York Institute of Technology, Old Westbury. The following year, he received Canadian citizenship and in 1986 resident-alien status in the United States. He began teaching at MIT in 1991, maintaining his residence in New York City while working in Cambridge, Massachusetts.

== Work ==
=== Projections ===
Wodiczko began developing his public projections in 1980 interfacing the facades of urban architecture – whether public monuments, public buildings, or corporate architecture – with images of the body to juxtapose the physical space of architecture with the psycho-social space of the public realm. "In the process of our socialization," the artist writes, "the very first contact with a public building is no less important than the moment of social confrontation with the father, through which our sexual role and place in society [are] constructed. Early socialization through patriarchal sexual discipline is extended by the later socialization through the institutional architecturalization of our bodies. Thus the spirit of the father never dies, continuously living as it does in the building which was, is, and will be embodying, structuring, mastering, representing, and reproducing his 'eternal' and 'universal' presence as a patriarchal wisdom-body of power."

In an often cited example, during his October 1984 exhibition at Hal Bromm Gallery, Krzysztof Wodiczko: Completing Facades, Wodiczko projected an image of the hand of Ronald Reagan, in formal dress shirt with cufflinks, posed in the pledge of allegiance, onto the north face of the AT&T Long Lines Building in the Tribeca district of New York City four days before the presidential election of 1984. "By creating a spectacle in which a fragment of the governing body, the presidential hand, was asked to stand for corporate business," writes Ewa Lajer-Burcharth, "Wodiczko offered a suggestion about the class identity of those forces that – hidden under the guise of God, State, and Nation – are the actual receivers of the pledge of allegiance." During the gallery exhibition, a second projection took place on the Washington Square Arch on lower Fifth Avenue. In subsequent projections, the artist layered iconic representations of global capitalism, militarism, and consumerism with images of fragments of the body to suggest a consideration of our relation to public space that is contingent both to history and social and political ideologies of the present.

Art historian Patricia C. Phillips writes of the artist's work: "In his public projects of the past decade, Wodiczko has conducted a series of active mediations that combine significant public sites, tough subjects, and aggressive statements that are only possible because of their temporality. He applies the immediate force of performance to social and political problems. The rhythms of extenuating events and the brevity of each installation give his projected episodes the intensity of public, political demonstrations. His thoroughly staged, illuminated images often require months of preparation, yet they seem like surprise attacks – fiercely focused parasitic invasions of renowned institutional hosts."

Perhaps the best-known and most popular intervention of this nature was performed when the artist created a projection for Nelson's column in Trafalgar Square, London in 1985. The South African government was at that time petitioning the British government for financial support. Wodiczko turned one of his projectors away from Nelson's column projecting a swastika onto the tympanum of the temple-like façade of South Africa House, the South African diplomatic mission to the United Kingdom. Though the image remained only two hours before the police suspended the intervention as a "public nuisance" it lingered in public awareness much longer. It is frequently cited at conferences, in classroom discussions, and other forum as an example of successful urban guerrilla cultural tactics – that is, art and/or performance that is waged by unexpected means for the purpose of engaging an active response.

Tijuana Projection, 2001. Public video projection at the Centro Cultural Tijuana, Mexico. Organized as part of the event InSite 2000.

In explaining the potential of cultural projects in the public sphere, the artist writes: "I try to understand what is happening in the city, how the city can operate as a communicative environment… It is important to understand the circumstances under which communication is reduced or destroyed, and under what possible new conditions it can be provoked to reappear. How can aesthetic practice in the built environment contribute to critical discourse between the inhabitants themselves and the environment? How can aesthetic practice make existing symbolic structures respond to contemporary events?" For Wodiczko, disrupting the complacency of perception is imperative for passersby to stop, reflect, and perhaps even change their thinking; so he built his visual repertoire to evoke both the historical past and the political present.

In this way, Wodiczko's visual repertoire for his projections expanded beyond the body (ears, eyes, and hands as indicators of human sensibility) to include chains, missiles, tanks, coins, cameras, boots, swastikas, guns, candles, food baskets, and corporate logos. "In these projections," writes Kathleen MacQueen, "the artist alternates between symbolic, iconic, and indexical images – the principal relations an image can have to its subject, according to the writings of Charles Sanders Peirce – that is, predicated on a cultural reference, a physical resemblance, or a physical relation respectively. In many instances they scramble all relations: the hand, an index of the body – someone's body – is also an iconic representation of communication that might symbolically represent an open or closed ideological position." The reductive, visual signs monumentally sized to fit the facades on which they are projected, are not meant to read as logos for a political agenda, instead they suggest a perceptual contradiction to disrupt the kind of assumptions that beset the casual passerby.

Wodiczko's visual interventions into public space are intended to alter what Jacques Rancière would later term the realm of the sensible. When the public views its urban monuments with sidelong glances out of the corners of its eyes, it accepts the monuments as natural and uncoded. By intercepting vision with projections, Wodiczko replaces an unconsidered reception with a critical one. This is the lesson of the Russian Formalists, of Bertolt Brecht's Verfremdungseffekt and of Friedrich Nietzsche's understanding of Goethe's belief that knowledge must quicken activity rather than lead to complacence.

The artist began to integrate direct activism into his projects in the late 1980s with his vehicles and his instruments, articles of design that would act as band-aids – not only healing social wounds but perhaps more importantly calling attention to them.

=== Vehicles ===
Homeless Vehicle, 1988–89, New York City

As homelessness reached over 100,000 in late 1980, Wodiczko used the ‘homeless vehicle’ as a source of discussion and discourse. While the artist had produced his first vehicle in Poland with additional conceptual versions designed when he lived in Canada, it was with his Homeless Vehicle Project of 1987–89, that he redirected "attention from the work of art as dissent to the work of art as social action: in this case, the discussions and design collaboration with members of the homeless community to develop both a physical object and a conceptual design that would make their participation in the urban economy visible and self-directed." Wodiczko's cart consisted of “a storage area for personal belongings, a washbasin that doubled as support for a table, a bin to hold cans and bottles, and, beneath its roof, just enough space for a desperate homeless man to sleep” The cart was used in New York and Philadelphia. The art sparked outrage as people thought the cart took up too much space resulting in the audience reaction becoming part of the art itself. The Homeless Vehicle Project was both symbolic and useful: the artist's first work to use a collective process to legitimize the problems of a marginal community "without legitimating the crisis of homelessness." While the public was cautious, the operators of the vehicles took the project seriously. According to Wodiczko, "You see this in certain gestures, certain ways of behaving, speaking, dialoguing, of building up stories, narratives: the homeless become actors, orators, workers, all things which they usually are not. The idea is to let them speak and tell their own stories, to let them be legitimate actors on the urban stage." The attention to testimony as a transformative process while still tentative in the Homeless Vehicle Project became a significant performative process in the artist's Instruments and eventually part of his projections as well. Through this art piece, Wodiczko was able to amplify the issue of homelessness in a society that dehumanizes and strips homeless people of their voice.

Wodiczko created Poliscar in 1991 as a kind of "command center" for communication and community activism – a vehicle equipped with first-aid supplies, video and radio transmission equipment, and tools for everyday survival, it could support legal, medical, and social crisis aid, the mobile units ranging from three to ten miles from a base station. Poliscar was a technological design for the disenfranchised public of the polis or public sphere. Later Wodiczko would merge his vehicles with his projections when working with war veterans (see "Recent Work").

=== Instruments ===
Wodiczko created the Personal Instrument in 1969, his first conceptual design work taken into the public sphere. Though he had a degree in industrial design and created popular electronics for a Polish manufacturer, his design philosophy was influenced by Russian constructivism epitomized by the poet/artist Vladimir Mayakovsky's statement, "the streets our brushes, the squares our palettes." The Personal Instrument consisted of a microphone, worn on the forehead, which retrieved sound while photo-receivers in gloves isolated and filtered the sound through the movement of the hand, which was then perceived discriminately by the artist, perceptually confined by the sound-proof headphones. By emphasizing selective listening, vital (under authoritarian restrictions) to a Polish citizen's survival, Wodiczko intimated the prevalence of censored speech, registering "dissent of a system that fostered one-directional critical thinking – listening over speech."

After his work with the homeless community in New York City and Philadelphia, Wodiczko returned to the possibilities of smaller, personal instruments as conceptual and functional objects to offset the problems of communication for urban migrants. Initially based on the iconic staff of the wandering prophet, the Alien Staff (1992 and its variant, 1992/93) was designed to mediate conversation between aliens (the juridical term designating all immigrants whether of legal or illegal status) and the franchised population of an urban environment. The staff not only presented an object of curiosity to passersby, causing them to interrupt their pace long enough to ask questions, it also became a repository of narrative recording and objects both sacred or necessary (e.g., green cards or family mementoes) to the lives of the immigrants. Influenced by Julia Kristeva's Strangers to Ourselves (1991), Wodiczko developed new equipment in 1993 that focused even more directly on democratic speech rights for the performative stranger. Mouthpiece (Porte-parole) was intended to act as a protective zone so that the immigrant could expand her narrative outward into a collective experience thereby pulling her out of isolation. The video technology, to be worn over the mouth, makes strange the familiar thereby creating a point of entry for passersby to enter into conversation with the immigrant. Between 1993 and 1997, thirteen culturally displaced persons used variants of the Mouthpiece in Paris, Malmö, Helsinki, Warsaw, Amsterdam, Trélazé, and Angers.

=== Xenology ===
In its earliest sense, the ancient Greek xeinos was the guest who received hospitality, as opposed to the xeinodokos or "host", who welcomed strangers and provided them with hospitality. It is from this perspective, that of the immigrant, the stranger within a society, as opposed to that of society or the xeinodokos viewing the outsider, that Wodiczko employs the term xenology: "Xenology is the art of refusal to be fused, an art of delimitization, deidentification, and disintegration" ("Xenology: Immigrant Instruments", exhibition statement distributed at the Galerie Lelong, New York, 1996). Wodiczko calls xenology "a new, nomadic, and yet undeveloped form of understanding and expression". Like the Eleatic Stranger (Xenos) in Plato's The Sophist, the vehicle of Wodiczko's xenology is a "nomadic Sophist", a "practitioner of democracy" who "recreate[s] an agora or forum each time he or she wishes to speak or listen."

== Recent work ==
...OUT OF HERE: The Veterans Project, 2009–2011. Seven-channel color video with sound. Installation view, Galerie Lelong, New York, 2011.

While working on Porte-parole in Europe, Wodiczko received an invitation from the filmmaker Andrzej Wajda to participate in an urban festival in Kraków using for the first time powerful Barco NV video projectors. Working with the Women's Center, he merged for the first time the testimonial work that had evolved from his work with instruments with the visual impact of his well-known large-scale public projections. Testimony of domestic abuse spoken from the City Hall Tower created shockwaves in an overwhelmingly Catholic culture of denial.

In this way, Wodiczko continued in his testimonial video projections to respond to the needs of urban society's marginal citizens who frequently survive outside the usual boundaries of juridical and social resources. In 2001, he merged the means of his instruments with the purpose of the projections in his Tijuana Projection executed for InSite 2000. In this public intervention, women working in the "maquiladora" industry of Tijuana, Mexico wore media technology designed to project their faces onto El Centro Cultural as they spoke emotionally of incest, police abuse, and work place discrimination in real time. As participants, their parrhesiastic speech was courageously offered at great risk to themselves for the purpose of moral and political change. Through the video projections, Wodiczko continues to develop the potential for aesthetic practice to effect social change as part of a wider discourse on agonistic pluralism prompted by such influences as Chantal Mouffe and Ludwig Wittgenstein.

The role of art in understanding and confronting conflict becomes an increasingly significant aspect of both Wodiczko's aesthetic and pedagogical practices. This is true in his continued work with immigrants and his recent work with war veterans in the Veteran Vehicle Project as well as his public lectures and teaching seminars worldwide including his seminar on "Trauma, Conflict, and Art" for the Warsaw School of Social Psychology. Recently, Wodiczko has also created projections for the interiors of cultural spaces as a metaphor for our psychological isolation from broader social and political experience. His 2005 exhibition at Galerie Lelong in New York City, If you see something…, his 2009 installation in the Polish Pavilion for the 53rd Venice Biennale, Guests, position the viewer in relation to the consequences of global capitalism and the conflict produced as a result of the inequitable distribution of resources and opportunities. Krzysztof Wodiczko believes in the necessity for intellectuals to participate actively in society forging, as critic Jan Avgikos points out, "a commitment to resistance and truth-telling that, while often derided as outmoded or impossible, remains a basic human impulse."

=== "...Out of Here: The Veterans Project" ===
In 2009, the Institute of Contemporary Art in Boston exhibited …Out of Here: The Veterans Project. The multimedia installation, which ran from November 4, 2009, to March 28, 2010, filled a dark and empty museum gallery with recorded voices and explosions, along with flashes of light, simulating the experience of a mortar attack in Iraq. On three walls of the gallery, projectors cast two horizontal rows of windows, creating the illusion that viewers were inside a darkened warehouse. The eight-minute audio track started with the bustle of traffic and citizens in an Iraqi city, brought in children's laughter, and subtly overlapped an excerpt from an Al Jazeera broadcast of President Obama speaking about the need to endure in Iraq. Listeners also noted an Islamic call to prayer, forebodingly drowned out by the approach of a helicopter. Without much warning, soldiers began yelling and shooting. When the gunfire ceased, a mother was heard wailing, and the episode ended in ominous silence (voices recorded for Out of Here belonged to a mixture of Iraqi-Americans, United States soldiers, and actors).

In the process of creating Out of Here, Wodiczko opted to expand the dictionary definition of veteran. Traditionally, the term is described as "a person who has served in a military force." Wodiczko has redefined veteran to include anyone who has lived in an area where war was fought at the time they lived there, for example, residents of Iraq from 2003 to 2011, or residents of Germany, England, France, etc. during World War II. The Iraqi-born civilians (veterans, by the artist's definition) who contributed to Out of Here, including the woman who lent her voice to the audio track, offered a perspective altogether different from those of the American military who had been in Iraq. This careful manipulation of the term foreshadows the artist's choice to insert his own thoughts in Out of Here, in addition to culling the testimonies of soldiers and Iraqis. Having lived through World War II in Poland and served in the Polish military during the cold war, Wodiczko is not merely working with veterans; he is one. The artist fulfills both old and new definitions of the word veteran.

One year later, Out of Here was shown at Galerie Lelong in New York City. This second iteration contained an excerpt from a different speech by the President, and mentioned the end of the war and the gradual withdrawal of troops. Speaking on the changes, the artist commented, "It made the work more up to date…but the irony is that this project didn't have to change much." Wodiczko cited the locations, Boston and New York, as sufficient to garner different readings of the work. "The works in Boston and New York have different publics. New York's character and the [art] shows gave Out of Here a big international audience as opposed to the more local audience in Boston." Collectively, these narratives paint a picture of the individual veterans who told them, the larger picture of the Iraq War, and the more subtle clues to the war's repercussions.

=== "Abraham Lincoln: War Veteran Projection" ===
For Abraham Lincoln: War Veteran Projection, presented by More Art, Wodiczko engaged with dozens of American war veterans and their family members to explore the traumatic consequences of war. The artist interviewed a total of fourteen participants, recording conversations about war experiences, the difficult return to civilian life, loss, and guilt. These interviews were then edited into a video that was projected on the statue of Abraham Lincoln In Union Square Park.

=== Projection on the Mickiewicz statue, Warsaw, 2008 ===
Wodiczko creates installations directly in urban spaces, often on historical monuments, all over the world, including in Warsaw. According to Kate Wyrembelska's research on "creative documentation", political messages are indeed present in Wodiczko's work. To mark the 40th anniversary of the last performance of "Dziady"—the monumental dramatic poem by Adam Mickiewicz—Krzysztof Wodiczko is preparing a special projection on the poet's monument in downtown Warsaw. Wyrembelska explains the context of this screening: in November 1967 Poland celebrated the 50th anniversary of the outbreak of the October Revolution (the Bolshevik Revolution) which notably marked the beginning of the dictatorship in Russia, according to Nicolas Werth. On this occasion, a number of propaganda, cultural, and scientific events were organized throughout the country. The National Theatre in Warsaw also participated in the celebrations. Its director, Kazimierz Dejmek, decided to stage Adam Mickiewicz's "Dziady" a work by one of the greatest Romantic poets, in a modern production. However, its patriotic and anti-Russian passages led to the performance being perceived as anti-Soviet and influenced the decision to ban it. On January 30, 2008, twenty-one years after the ceremonies, the Polish people finally heard poems by Mickiewicz. The artist, Wodiczko, "animated" the monument to the poet Mickiewicz, using video projection accompanied by sound. The statue recited the monologue of Konrad, the protagonist of Dziady delivering his reflections on freedom and enslavement. Wodiczko emphasized that he did not want to reconstruct a monument from the past, but rather that he wished to critique collective memory and the way it is constructed.

== Prizes and awards ==
Hiroshima Projection, 1999. Public video projection at the A-Bomb Dome, Hiroshima, Japan.

- 2009 – Golden Medal "Gloria Artist" from the Polish Ministry of Culture for his exceptional contribution to Polish culture.
- 2009 Medal for the Contribution to the Promotion of Polish Culture Abroad from the Polish Ministry of Foreign Affairs.
- 2008 Skowhegan Medal for Sculpture.
- 2007 Katarzyna Kobro Award of the Polish Cultural Institute.
- 2005 College Art Association artist award for a distinguished body of work.
- 2004 Kepesz Award from the Massachusetts Institute of Technology.
- 1998 4th International Hiroshima Prize for his contribution as an artist to world peace.

== Bibliography ==
=== Selected publications, essays, and interviews by the artist ===
- 2014, "The Transformative Avant-Garde: A Manifest of the Present," Third Text 28:2 (2014): 111–122.
- 2009, City of Refuge: A 9/11 Memorial. Edited by Mark Jarzombek and Mechtild Widrich. London: Black Dog Publishing.
- 2009, "Designing for a City of Strangers" in The Design Culture Reader, edited by Ben Highmore, Routledge.
- 2008, "Questionnaire: Krzysztof Wodiczko." October 123, "In what ways have artists, academics, and cultural institutions responded to the U.S.-led invasion and occupation of Iraq?" (Winter 2008): 172–179.
- 2003, "Creating Democracy: A Dialogue with Krzysztof Wodiczko" by Patricia C. Phillips in Art Journal 64, no. 4 (Winter 2003): 33–47.
- 2003, "The Tijuana Projection, 2001" in Rethinking Marxism 15, no. 3 (July 2003): 422–423.
- 2002, "Instruments Projections Monuments" in AA Files 43: 31–41.
- 1999, Critical Vehicles: Writings, Projects and Interviews. Cambridge, MA: The MIT Press, 1999.
- 1997, "Alien Staff, Krzysztof Wodiczko in Conversation with Bruce Robbins." In Veiled Histories: The Body, Place, and Public Art. Edited by Anna Novakov. New York: San Francisco Art Institute and Critical Press, 1997.
- 1990, "Projections." Perspecta 26, Theater, Theatricality, and Architecture (1990): 273–287.
- 1988, "Conversations about a project for a homeless vehicle." October 47 (Winter 1988): 68–76.
- 1986, "Conversation with Krzysztof Wodiczko." With Douglas Crimp, Rosalyn Deutsche and Ewa Lajer-Burcharth. October 38 (Winter 1986): 22–51.
- 1986, "Krzysztof Wodiczko: Public Projections." October 38 (1986): 3-22.

=== Selected catalogs ===
- 2009, Guests/Goscie. With John Rajchman, Bozena Czubak, and Ewa Lajer-Burcharth. Milan and New York: Charta.
- 2005, Krzysztof Wodiczko: Projekcje Publiczne, Public Projections 1996-2004. With contributions by Anna Smolak, Malgorzata Gadomska, Dariusz Dolinski, et al., The Bunker Sztuki Contemporary Art Gallery, Kraków.
- 1998, Krzysztof Wodiczko, Hiroshima Museum of Contemporary Art, July–September.
- 1995, Krzysztof Wodiczko: Projects and Public Projections 1969-1995, De Appel Foundation.
- 1995, Sztuka Publiczna, Center for Contemporary Art, Warsaw.
- 1994, Art public, art critique, Paris.
- 1992, Public Address: Krzysztof Wodiczko, Walker Art Center, Minneapolis.
- 1991, The Homeless Vehicle Project. With David Lurie, edited by Kyoichi Tsuzuki, Kyoto Shoin.
- 1990, Krzysztof Wodiczko: New York City Tableau, Tompkins Square, The Homeless Vehicle Project, Exit Art, New York City.
- 1987, Counter-Monuments: Krzysztof Wodiczko's Public Projections with Katy Kline and Ewa Lajer-Burcharth, List Visual Arts Center.

=== Selected critical and scholarly studies ===
- 2014, Marc James Léger, "Aesthetic Responsibility: A Conversation with Krzysztof Wodiczko on the Transformative Avant-Garde," Third Text 28:2 (2014): 123–136.
- 2014, Kathleen MacQueen, "Casting Shadows: Krzysztof Wodiczko's If You See Something..." in Tactical Response: Art in an Age of Terror (Agon Press, 2014) 103–171.
- 2012, Blake J. Ruehrwein, "Wodiczko's Veterans: Artist, Institution, and Audience in ...Out of Here: The Veterans Project," M.A. Thesis, City College of New York, Dec 2012.
- 2011, Duncan McCorquodale, ed. Krzysztof Wodiczko, with contributions by Dick Hebdige, Denis Hollier, and Lisa Saltzman, Black Dog Publishing.
- 2009, Eva Marxen, "Therapeutic Thinking in Contemporary Art or Psychotherapy in the Arts" in The Arts in Psychotherapy 36: 131–139.
- 2008–09, Ewa Lajer-Burchardt, "Interiors at Risk: Precarious Spaces in Contemporary Art" in Harvard Design Magazine 29 (Fall-Winter 2008–09)
- 2008, Dora Apel, "Technologies of War, Media, and Dissent in the Post 9/11 Work of Krzysztof Wodiczko" in Oxford Art Journal 31, no. 2 (June 2008): 261–280.
- 2008, Rosalyn Deutsche, "The Art of Witness in the Wartime Public Sphere" in Forum Permanente, transcript of the Tate Modern lecture, March 4, 2005.
- 2007, Tom Williams, "Architecture and Artifice in the Recent Work of Krzysztof Wodiczko" in Shifting Borders, edited by Reid W.F. Cooper, Luke Nicholson, and Jean-François Bélisle, Cambridge Scholars Publishing.
- 2006–7, Lisa Saltzman, "When Memory Speaks: A Monument Bears Witness" in Trauma and Visuality in Modernity, edited by Lisa Saltzman and Eric Rosenberg, University Press of New England and in Making Memory Matter: Strategies of Remembrance in Contemporary Art, The University of Chicago Press.
- 2006, Mark Jarzombek, "The Post-traumatic Turn and the Art of Walid Ra'ad and Krzystof Wodiczko: from Theory to Trope and Beyond" in Trauma and Visuality in Modernity, ed. Saltzman and Rosenberg.
- 2002, Andrzej Turowski, "Krzysztof Wodiczko and Polish Art of the 1970s" in Primary Documents: A Sourcebook for Eastern and Central European Art Since the 1950s, The Museum of Modern Art.
- 2002, Rosalyn Deutsche, "Sharing Strangeness: Krzysztof Wodiczko's Aegis and the Question of Hospitality" in Grey Room 6 (Winter 2002): 26–43.
- 1998, Rosalyn Deutsche, Evictions: Art and Spatial Politics, The MIT Press.
- 1997, Marc James Léger, "Xenology and Identity in Critical Public Art: Krzysztof Wodiczko's Immigrant Instruments." Parachute (Oct, Nov, Dec 1997): 14–21.
- 1993, Denis Hollier. "While the City Sleeps: Mene, Mene, Tekel, Upharsin'" in October 64 (Spring 1993).
- 1989, Patricia C. Philips, "Temporality and Public Art." Art Journal 48, no. 4 (Winter 1989): 331–335.
- 1987, Ewa Lajer-Burchardt, "Urban Disturbances." Art in America (November 1987): 146–153, 197.
- 1986, Rosalyn Deutsche, "Krzysztof Wodiczko's Homeless Projection and the Site of 'Urban Revitalization." October 38 (Fall 1986): 63–99.

=== Films and video ===
- 2005, Susan Sollins and Susan Dowling, series producers. Art 21, Art in the Twenty-first Century. Season Three. Alexandria, VA: PBS Home Video.
- 2000, Yasushi Kishimoto, Krzysztof Wodiczko: Projection in Hiroshima, 70m/color, Ufer! Art Documentary.
- 1991, Derek May. Krzyszstof Wodiczko: Projections. Ottawa, Ontario, Canada: National Film Board of Canada.
- 2022, Maria Niro, Krzysztof Wodiczko: The Art of Un-War, 63m/color, and Black and White, Crossing Waters, Art Documentary.. New York, New York, United States.
