= Town Hall Los Angeles =

Town Hall Los Angeles is a non-profit speaker's forum based in Los Angeles. It was founded in 1937. It has hosted over 3500 unpaid speakers, including

- John F. Kennedy
- Robert F. Kennedy
- Ronald Reagan
- Condoleezza Rice
- General Anthony Zinni
- Russ Feingold
- Dianne Feinstein
- Arnold Schwarzenegger
- Prince Turki Al-Faisal
