= Frank Holliday =

American painter

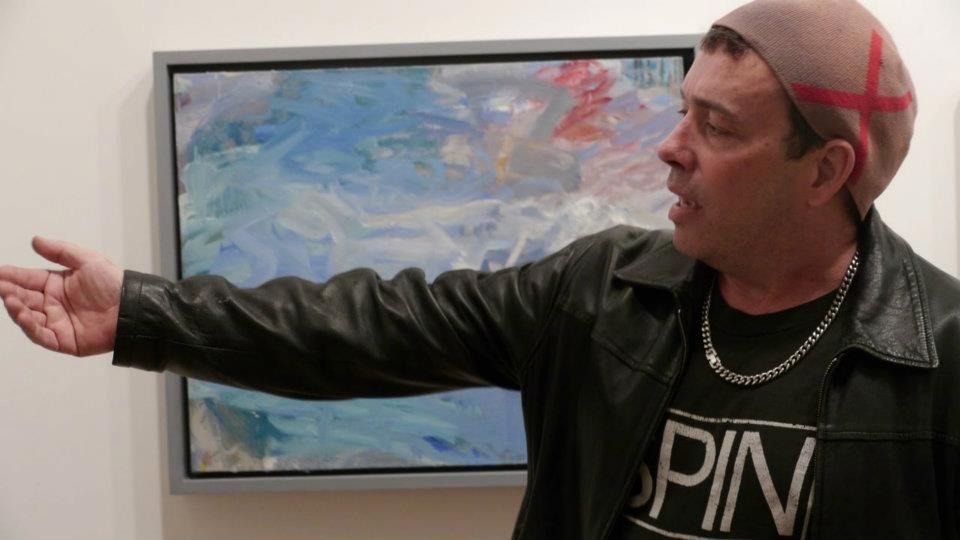
- Frank Holliday at the Painting Center in New York City
- Born: 1957 (age 68–69); Greensboro, North Carolina, U.S.
- Education: School of Visual Arts, New York City
- Known for: Painting, performance
- Movement: Neo-expressionism, East Village
- Awards: Adolph and Esther Gottlieb Grant, Pollock-Krasner Grant, Guggenheim Fellowship

Frank Holliday (born 1957, North Carolina) is an American painter who became known in the New York City art world in the 1970s and 1980s. He is often associated with the East Village scene and associated with Club 57. His early career as an artist included working with Andy Warhol and close associations with artists such as Keith Haring Ann Magnuson and Kenny Scharf.

== Catalogs ==
- 2004 Biannua IEssay by Michael Braake
- 2002 With Or Without YouEssay by Royce Smith
- 2001 Tripping in AmericaEssay by Elizabeth Murray, Debs & Co.
- Figure/Disfigure Essay by J. Toinick, URI
- 1999 Wah Wah Series Essay by Anney Bonney, Nick Debs
- No Show Essay by Dale Peck, Nick Debs
- 1986 Correspondences Essay by N. Mouforrage

== Bibliography ==
- 2009 New York Observer, The Gallery Is Fake, But the Paintings Are Real, By Leon Neyfakh
- 2007 The New York Times Holland Cotter
- 2004 Gay City News "Queering MoMA", a panel discussion with artists "Frank Holliday", Carrie Moyer, Stephen Mueller, Sheila Pepe and Andrew Cornell Robinson.
- 2003 Art Net March Walter Robinson
- 2003 Gay City News March 23, 2003, Mick Meehan
- 2002 Art in America January 1, 2003
- 2001 The New Yorker October 23, 2001
- 2001 The New York Times November 2, 2001, Review by Ken Johnson
- 2000 Art Issues January 10, 2000, Review by David Humphrey
- 2000 Absolute ArtBook
- 1999 The New Yorker Pick
- 1999 New York Magazine Pick
- 1998 Excélsior Mexico City
- 1998 Novedades Mexico City
- 1998 El Reforma Mexico City
- 1997 The New York Times Review by Ken Johnson
- 1997 The New Yorker Pick
- 1997 New York Magazine Pick
- 1997 Art In America Holland Cotter
- 1990 The New Yorker Pick
- 1989 Art In America Review
- 1989 Native New Yorker Review by David Hirsh
- 1988 Juliet Spray International Survey
- 1984 The New York Times The Beast by Grace Glueck
- 1984 Flash Art East Village By N. Moufourrage

== Grants ==
- 2015 Guggenheim Fellowship
- 2010 Pollock Krasner Foundation Fellowship
- 2010 Gottlieb Foundation Fellowship
- 1986 National Endowment for the Arts

== Collections ==
- Weatherspoon Museum
- Museum Frederick Russe, Stockholm Sweden
- Miniature Museum, Amsterdam, Netherlands

== Education ==
- BFA: School of Visual Arts 1979
- San Francisco Art Institute
- New York Studio School
