= Hope Sandrow =

American artist

- Born: Philadelphia, PA
- Known for: Conceptual art, multi-disciplinary, photography and social practice.
- Notable work: Men On The Streets, Hope & Fear, Memories Space Time, water life, The Artist & Homeless Collaborative, Material Matters, open air studio space time, Coop Lewitt: (re)constructing Sol LeWitt, On the Road, The Sky is Falling, Genius Loci
- Spouse: Ulf Skogsbergh
- Awards: National Endowment for the Arts - Visual Artists Special Projects Grant, New York Foundation for the Arts, Artist - New Works, Warhol Foundation Grant, Skowhegan Governor's Award
- Website: www.hopesandrow.site

Hope Sandrow (born 1951) is an American conceptual artist who works in the mediums of photography, video, mixed media, installation, sculpture, new media, performance, and social practice.

== Early life and education ==
Sandrow was born in Philadelphia, PA and grew up in Southern (Camden and Cherry Hill) New Jersey, attending Beaver College, Drexel University and Philadelphia College of Art. Her family emigrated from Russia to Philadelphia at the end of the 19th century.

Sandrow joined the emerging environmental movement as a high school freshman with the encouragement of her maternal grandparents, Pearl and Morris Liebman who nominated Sandrow as the inaugural "Miss Cleaner Air Week" held in recognition of the Air Quality Control Act.

Sandrow's art practice often parallels her life experiences. This is the conceptual context that is explored in all her work including open air studio spacetime.

== Early Influences ==
Marcel Duchamp was an early major influence, stemming from Sandrow viewing his works at The Philadelphia Museum of Art from the time she was a young child. Duchamp's way of working with "what is", chance, readymades and his intrigue with the concept of depicting the fourth dimension in art.

Sandrow also found inspiration in the work of Earth Artists, Nancy Holt, Ana Mendieta, Robert Smithson and James Turrell; her friend and mentor Feminist Artist, Nancy Spero and her husband artist, Leon Golub, and East Village colleagues.

== Career ==
Sandrow creates installations and works of art that integrate site, history, culture, and social practices.

Her photographic and installation work(s), Memories Spaces Time, Hope & Fear, and water life, the latter, shown at The Whitney Museum (Philip Morris) in 1998 references the body, skin, the earth, water—in essence, the environment and the way people respond to, and treat their bodies – consequently, the earth as the macrocosm. Sandrow created the medium of silver print fragments in Memories and Spaces: peeling the emulsion from the paper base reflecting and embodying the context of the works.

In the 1980s, Sandrow was associated with the East Village scene that included colleagues, Keiko Bonk, Jimmy DeSana, Mike Bidlo, Luis Frangella, Futura 2000, Judy Glantzman, Keith Haring, Peter Hujar, Gracie Mansion, Carlo McCormick, Nicolas Mouferrage, Walter Robinson, Sur Rodney (Sur), David Wojnarowicz, Rhonda Zwillinger.

Some of the early series that Sandrow produced in the 1980s included, Men On The Streets, Back on the Streets, Hope & Fear, In Response(mounted) were shown at the Hirshhorn Museum, Gracie Mansion Gallery, Zero1 (Los Angeles) and included in the permanent collections of the Whitney Museum of Art, The Metropolitan Museum of Art, and The Museum of Modern Art.

In 1990, she received a National Endowment for the Arts - Artist Fellowship Grant, for her public artwork, The Artist & Homeless Collaborative and later received the Skowhegan Governor's Award. In 2022, the works of art from that project were presented by The New York Historical, in its exhibition, Art for Change: The Artist and Homeless Collaborative, and included Sandrow's Men On The Streets.

Material Matters: Art at the Anchorage was a commission by Creative Time's director, Anne Pasternak in 1995. For this large-scale installation Sandrow invited the participation of artists: Terry Adkins; Jane Dickson; Robin Kahn; Susan Leopold; Christian Marclay; Matthew McCaslin; Sara Pasti & Artist; Neighbors; Glenn Seator, and John Yau.

Her series water life, was commissioned as a solo exhibition at The Whitney Museum, Philp Morris in 1998.

In 1998, curator, Andy Grundberg, commissioned Sandrow to travel and create artwork for the traveling exhibition In Response to Place. The result was her installation, time(space) opening on September 11, 2001, at The Corcoran Gallery of Art and traveling on for four years.

In 2006, while on a walk in the woods of Shinnecock Hills, she encountered a Padovana rooster, later named Shinnecock for the location where they met. He then followed her home. This chance encounter inspired her ongoing project open air studio space time, a homesite for experimentation engaged in the creative process.

That same year, 2006, Alanna Heiss, Director and Chief Curator of PS1, commissioned Sandrow to create the installation, Godt Tegn Open Air Studio Shinnecock Hills spacetime. The installation featured a selection of large-scale panoramas documenting the life and travels of Shinnecock, the young rooster who followed her home, as well as the land that Sandrow campaigned to preserve in Shinnecock Hills.

From 2006 onward, Sandrow was commissioned and presented her work at The Museum of Art and Design, NYC; The New York Historical, NYC; The Contemporary Museum Baltimore, MD; The Parrish Art Museum, Southampton, NY; The Southampton Historical Museum, The US Embassy in Jakarta, and LongHouse Reserve among others.

She created and initiated a performative collaborative work, On The Road from 2007 - 2010 with several artists including, Sur Rodney Sur and Fluxus artist, Geoffrey Hendricks. In 2023 and 2024, she collaborated with Kelly and Jeremy Dennis and Brianna Hernandez at Ma's House on The Shinnecock Tribal Nation land.

Sandrow's work is in the permanent collections of The Museum of Modern Art, The Metropolitan Museum of Art, The Whitney Museum of American Art, The Corcoran Collection at the National Gallery of Art, The Parrish Art Museum, The Houston Museum of Fine Arts, The New York Historical, and other public and private collections including Eli Broad Foundation, Agnes Gund, Dakis Joannou, Vera List, Geoffrey Hendricks, Sur Rodney Sur, Henry Buhl Foundation, Jeffrey Deitch and Dorothy Lichtenstein.

== Group exhibitions: 1980s ==
- The Famous Show, curated by Gracie Mansion, Gracie Mansion Gallery NYC (1992)
- A Flag for the Eighties, curated by Nicolas Mouferrege, P.S.1, Long Island City, NY (1992)
- Spring Street Pier, curated by David Wojnarowicz and Mike Bidlo NYC (1983)
- Limbo, curated by Walter Robinson and Carlo McCormick, MOMA/PS1 (1984)
- New Galleries of the Lower East Side, curated by Helene Winer, Artists Space, NYC
- The New Portrait, curated by Jeffrey Deitch, P.S.1 Long Island City, NY (1984)
- New Galleries of the Lower East Side, curated by Helene Winer, Artists Space, NYC (1984)
- Climbing:The East Village, curated by Carlo McCormick, Hal Bromm Gallery (1984)
- Neo York curated by Phyllis Plous and Mary Looker, University Art Museum, University of California at Santa Barbara California (1984)
- Directions Biennial Toward the Baroque, curated by Phyllis Rosenzweig, Hirshhorn Museum, Washington, DC. Sandrow, Stella, Morris and Turrell (1986)
- The East Village curated by Richard Martin, Harold Koda, Laura Sindebrand, Fashion Institute of Technology, NYC.(1986)
- Biennial: Painting and Sculpture Today, Indianapolis Museum of Art (1986);
- Group UFO (photography) curated by Sur Rodney Sur, Gracie Mansion Gallery NYC (1987)
- Contemporary Diptychs: The New Shape of Content curated by Roni Feinstein, Whitney Museum of American Art at Equitable Center NYC and Fairfield, CT.(1987)
- Large As Life: Contemporary Photography curated by Kellie Jones, Henry Street Settlement, NYC; Jamaica Arts Center (1987)
- Arrangements for the Camera: A View of Contemporary Photography, Baltimore Museum of Art, Maryland (1987)
- Photography on the Edge, curated by Curtis Carter, Haggerty Museum of Art, Marquette University, Mil, WI (1988)
- The Photography of Invention: American Pictures of the 1980s, curated by Joshua P. Smith, National Museum of American Art, Washington, DC. Travels to: Museum of Contemporary Art, Chicago; Walker Arts Center, Minnesota (1989);
- Sequence (Con)Sequence: Photographic Multiples of the Eighties, curated by Julia Ballerini Blum Art Institute, Bard College, New York (1989)
- East Village USA, curated by Dan Cameron, New Museum (2005)

== Social Practices ==
Amid a culture of war, sexism, racism, and anti-semitism, Sandrow's art practice developed to reference life experiences - including recurrent sexism, harassment and abuse within art historical references such as her work, In Response(mounted), in reference to Marcel Duchamp's work Etant Donnés. Subsequently, she became a member of Visual Aids, Coalition for Freedom of Expression, Women's Action Coalition (WAC). She founded her own public art project The Artist & Homeless Collaborative a collaboration between artists, arts professionals colleagues and women and children who had lost their homes and living in New York City shelters. More recently, since 2003, she has been engaged in land preservation with the Shinnecock Nation in “(RE)collecting An American Dream” and “Sketches of Local History." Sandrow has shared her hens' eggs with members of The Retreat (2010-2016) and since the pandemic distributed over 13,000 eggs to the Shinnecock Food Pantry a consideration of Sandrow's project Nourishing Reciprocity. In 2017, she founded and now chairs the Town of Southampton Arts and Culture Committee.

== Major works ==
=== Men on The Streets (1978–1984) ===
Sandrow's first photographic series, is a series of street performances realized as photographic stills—the silver prints were handprinted by the artist. In 2019, the work was included Nicolas Mouferrage's solo exhibition at The Queens Museum. Sandrow's series explores gender discrimination by employing role reversal by returning the gaze towards men. As a response to The Equal Rights Amendment passed by Congress on March 22, 1972, Sandrow photographed primarily near Wall Street, the World Trade Center and in downtown Los Angeles investigating the parameters of "the personal" in relationship to the universal. Employing role reversal, i.e., challenging the notion of a woman walking alone on city streets, playing the "bad" girl, Sandrow propositioned male strangers to pose for portraits (not sex), for them to be looked at rather than being the looker. The body of work was first exhibited in the group show Six Young Photographers at the Soho Aldrich Center for the Visual Artists, NYC.

=== Back on The Streets (1982–1985) ===
Back on the Streets a series of photographic portraits that references inside/outside, physically and metaphorically. The portraits were of East Village and Los Angeles artist friends posed outdoors amidst the moneyed corridors of Wall Street and LA Business District (1982–85). Selections of this work were included in New Museum Senior Curator, Dan Cameron's exhibition, East Village USA (2005) and first exhibited at Gracie Mansion Gallery.

=== Museum Studies: Hope & Fear (1986) ===
Hope & Fear is a black and white photographic series shown at the Hirshhorn Museum in the exhibition, Toward the Baroque, as part of the Hirshhorn Biennial: Directions 1986 with artists, Frank Stella, James Turrell, Robert Morris and Hope Sandrow.

=== In response (mounted) (1989–1991) ===
Marcel Duchamp's Étant Donnés is the art historical and personal reference for this series. Duchamp's seminal work was installed at the Philadelphia Museum of Art in 1969. The naked woman pictured in Duchamp's surreal tableau assumed personal context months later in Sandrow's own life, when behind a closed door Sandrow was similarly poised but on the examining table of an assailant. In 1970, from that same Museum's windows, Sandrow enjoyed views of the inaugural Earth Week celebration and attended events in Fairmount Park. As a high school freshman, Sandrow joined the emerging environmental movement in which her maternal grandmother and father involved her.

Sandrow's mounted response, was exhibited in a solo show at Gracie Mansion Gallery in 1989 and Grey Art Gallery in 1991. The work addressed the enshrouded secrecy of violence against women.

=== Water Life (1998) ===
Water Life an installation of photographic works, sculpture and sound installation that was shown at The Whitney Museum of American Art, 1998 as a solo exhibition. The collection of shells revived childhood memories of Marcel Duchamp's (1935) Rotoreliefs (Optical Disc) prints at the Philadelphia Museum of Art; science and planetarium exhibits down the street at the Franklin Institute.

=== Time (space) (1998–2001) ===
Time (space) is a multi media installation composed of large-scale photographic panoramas, video, and an online video stream with a dedicated website during travel. The work was created onsite the Indonesian islands of Bali, Flores, Komodo and Rinja, and was a commission for the traveling exhibition Response to place: Place Matters at The Corcoran Gallery of Art, Washington DC in 2001, opening on 9/11/2001 and curated by Andy Grundberg.

The exhibition traveled to: Houston Museum of Science, Houston, Texas; Bellevue Art Museum, Seattle, Wa.; Rhode Island School of Design, Providence Rhode Island; Minnesota Museum of American Art, St.Paul, Minn.; Utah Museum of Natural History, Salt Lake City, Utah, High Museum of Art, Atlanta GA; Indianapolis Museum of Art, Indianapolis; Green Hill Center, Greensboro N.C.; Yellowstone Art Museum, Billings, Montana; Scottsdale Museum Contemporary Art, Ar, Chicago Cultural Center, Chicago, Ill; Cincinnati Contemporary Arts Center, Cinn, Ohio; Gibbs Museum, Charleston, S.C.; Contemporary Arts Center, Virginia Beach, Va; Severin Gallery, Sun Valley, Idaho; Boston Public Library, Mass; Bluestar Arts Center, San Antonio. The complete installation is in the collection of the Corcoran Collection at The National Gallery of Art in Washington, DC.

In the waters off of Komodo (Indonesia), where conservation work focuses on preserving the threatened marine environment of its coral reefs, Sandrow produced a series of panoramas constructed from pictures taken with the lens of her camera halfway under-water. The technique allows us to see the marine and terrestrial "landscape" simultaneously, although at different magnifications. Since each camera image is a single exposure, the composite panorama embeds time as well; the variations of color, horizon line, and point of view indicate that chance also plays a large role in the artist's activity. In addition to the photographs, Sandrow has produced a video that describes her experiences on the trip and a website that functions as a day-by-day journal. The installation of this work also includes a series of boxes (arranged in 6 rows of 6) that contain powdered white chalk. The boxes are in the proportion of the Golden Rectangle, a form based in nature and revered by classical civilizations, and the chalk they hold is the ground remains of coral, the essential component of the reefs now being devastated by fishing techniques using dynamite and cyanide. — Andy Grundberg, Curator, 2001

=== The Artist and Homeless Collaborative (1990) ===
The Artist and Homeless Collaborative was created in 1990 by Hope Sandrow as an interdisciplinary public art project. An experimental laboratory in social and cultural studies sited in New York City shelters that were housed in armories where Modern Art was first exhibited in America, and, at The Whitney Museum of Art and Museum of Modern Art. The artworks addressed issues relating to race, class, money, ageism, discrimination, gender, domestic violence, rape, multiculturalism and AIDS. At a time when the American "right" was blaming Gay men for AIDS; artists as the cause of ill in our culture; women for their own rape; the poor for losing their homes. Marginalization is an oft-used means to isolate those deemed not to fit "in." Sandrow and her colleagues created works of art through dialogue and collaboration with residents of the Park Avenue Shelters for Homeless Women housed in the upper floors of the 68 and 69th Regiment Armories; joined by teens and children from the Regent Family residence at The Whitney Museum of Art and Museum of Modern Art.

=== The Other Side of the Rainbow (1992) ===
The Other Side of the Rainbow is a collaborative project between Sandrow and artist, Robin Tewes. The topic is sexual abuse: which includes verbal and physical harassment and rape, covering the spectrum from being treated in a condescending manner to physical violation. This project reaches out to include people from, diverse racial, class and cultural backgrounds, living and working in universities, prisons, homes, streets, institutions et al. During the solicitation of testimonies on-site presentations, participants select and write on the color-coded index card that relates to the age they were at the time they were sexually abused.

=== Flag for the Nineties (1992) ===
A mixed media work composed of color polaroids, staples and a worn American flag that Sandrow was given by the Dept of Veteran Affairs marking her great Uncle Bill's Zucker grave in Arlington Cemetery. It was a private commission by Vera List in 1992, and curated by The New School curator, Kathleen Goncharov "to document the diverse cultures of the New York Art Community." Sandrow selected colleagues to sit for portraits realized as color polaroids; then peeled from the film's base and stapled together juxtaposed to the worn red, white and blue fabric. The work includes images of Will Guy, Thelma Golden, Komar & Melamid, Candida Alvarez, Patrick O’Connell, Ida Panicelli, Billie Tsien, Lucy Lippard, Adal Maldonado, Maria Elena Gonzalez, Louise Bourgeois, Vito Acconci, Sur Rodney Sur, Martha Wilson, Maura Sheehan, Sam Reveles, Kay Walkingstick, Thomas Sokolowski, and Fred Wilson. The work was never exhibited.

=== Material Matters (1995) ===
Material Matters was an invitational project conceived of and organized by Hope Sandrow at the Brooklyn Anchorage (Creative Time, director Anne Pasternak) that included artists: Terry Adkins; Jane Dickson; Robin Kahn; Susan Leopold; Christian Marclay; Matthew McCaslin; Sara Pasti & Artist / Neighbors; Hope Sandrow; Glenn Seator, and John Yau.

=== Untitled observations spacetime (2001–2007) ===
Untitled observations spacetime is a series created from 2001–2007 is an investigation into the nuances of seeing and knowing through the process of collecting images, thoughts, and experiences in the wake of "911" and follow Sandrow's recovery from sexual assault. Exhibited in the form of panoramas and singularly focused still and video works at multiple sites on Eastern Long Island where the landscape reflects that of Manhattan a century ago. The series represents the natural history of everyday life in which notions of beauty, art, science, and myth are investigated, such as how images produced by technology (the camera and telescope) are mirroring our world and evoking profoundly different ideas than pictorial representations made by hand and from memory.

Sandrow's process mirrors the practice of Paduan Galileo Galilei use of a camera obscura to project telescopic images traced on paper -Sidereus Nuncias. This was a method that led to his challenging 2000 years of Aristotelian thinking: discovery of the Moon's rocky surface. A contemporary influence and inspiration for Sandrow's work is Nancy Holt, an artist whose work, including Holes of Light and Locators, "provided a new lens for observing natural phenomena."

Viewing primary elements of the visible world places observations and beliefs in specific cultural (matriarchy or patriarchy) and science-based contexts; time frames of lunar or solar calendars. Live streams position viewers’ memories as having been "firsthand" as shown in the collective experience of "911." "Looking to the skies" to foretell a lunar eclipse is now "looking online" at NASA "Index To Five Millennium Catalog of Lunar Eclipses." "Mapping" has a new meaning when applied to global technology as this information revolution profoundly affects the world in all dimensions

=== (Re)collecting an American's Dream (READ) (2006–2008) ===
Explores conflicting issues of preservation and development in the mediums of photography, video, mixed media, and social practice (2006 - 2008). The subject is the historic 13-acre estate Gissa-Bu (circa 1930) where Sandrow followed the cockerel, Shinnecock on March 30, 2006, across the road days after the land's trees were clear-cut. Two exhibits, "Godt Tegn" MoMA - PS1 and Southampton Historical Museum (at The Rogers Mansion formerly Samuel B. Parrish's home at the time he owned the 13 acres) were mounted to engage the community in the ultimately successful preservation effort. Illustrating that the world is full of chance happenings.

=== open air studio spacetime (2006 ongoing) ===
open air studio spacetime was founded in 2006 by Sandrow. Since that time Sandrow has grown the project into a multi-tiered unfolding of Padovana flocks amid her research engaged in multiple studies ranging from astronomy to pre-history. Joyce Beckenstein describes Sandrow's use of materials in open air studio spacetime as "subversive," as Sandrow attempts to "symbolically" return the land to the "natural flora and fauna" and "displaced Native Americans." Sandrow has stated that her "intention is to present the natural history of everyday life, while regenerating discourse on nature, art, culture, and history."

=== The Sky is Falling (2006) ===
The Sky is Falling is a photographic series commissioned by art philanthropist, Agnes Gund realized as 19 albumen prints. Sandrow's title for the work comes from the central phrase in the folk tale "Chicken Little" aka “Henny Penny.” Which came first the chicken or the egg?: the story began when the rooster in the portrait, Shinnecock followed Sandrow home in 2006.

=== Godt Tegn Open Air Studio Shinnecock Hills spacetime (2006/2007) ===
International Projects, MoMA-PS1 curated by Alanna Heiss, 2006/2007, is a selection of large-scale panoramic photographs documenting the life and travels of Shinnecock, the young rooster who followed Sandrow home and roosted in her garden. The nearby land was acquired into the Town of Southampton Community Preservation Fund as a result of Sandrow then following the rooster, Shinnecock across the road. A member of the ancient breed of Padovana fowl that were painted by 16th century Italian artists and who once roamed freely among the Native Americans on Long Island, Shinnecock led the artist to explore and engage in the landscape around her home and studio.

=== Coop LeWitt: (re)constructing Sol LeWitt (2009) ===
Coop LeWitt North, South, East and Cube are four structures created for Sandrow's flock one of which, Coop LeWitt East was commissioned by Museum of Art and Design, Chief Curator, Lowrey Stokes Sims for the exhibition, Against The Grain in 2013. The coops were modeled on LeWitt's India ink drawings from his 1982 series Forms Derived from a Cube and were (re)constructed into four dimensions (the fourth being, Time) to shelter the Padovana Rooster Shinnecock and his family flock. They were inspired by chance encounters, beginning with the white Padovana cockerel Shinnecock, who crossed the road to follow Sandrow home to a spider on a LeWitt wall drawing at Dia Beacon. This is an example of LeWitt's practice taken to Sandrow's practice and taking form into function. Steel spirals, balls, and glass letters were also placed to reflect light and as a means of repelling predators such as hawks, herons, and, eagles. The look of a display case characterizes the Cube: like contemporary artists, Padovana's are now considered mainly for "exhibition purposes"; prior to the industrialization of farm practices, they were renowned for their delicious eggs.

Coop LeWitt East was commissioned by the Museum of Art and Design curators, Lowery Stokes Sims and Elizabeth Kirrane for the travelling exhibit Against the Grain, at the Museum of Art and Design, NYC. The exhibition traveled to The Mint Museum, North Carolina, and The Museum of Art, Fort Lauderdale, Florida.

=== Observational Findings, (2006–2022) ===
Sandrow researches and monitors the birth rate, and the impact of temperature changes on the birthrate. An estimated 31,440 (as of January 5, 2022) eggs were laid by hens during the project's trajectory. Those not used for breeding are consumed by Sandrow and Skogsbergh and shared with family, friends, colleagues, and neighbors, The Retreat, and Shinnecock Indian Nation Food Pantry.

=== On The Road (2007) ===
On The Road is a collaborative performative art project that takes the process of art the road and out of the cubicle of art museums and galleries. The series includes En Plein Air with Tom Edmonds, Ulf Skogsbergh, Margaret Kelly and Hope Sandrow – a re-enactment of Edouard Manet's painting "Le Dejeuner sur l'Herbe" referencing the pastoral landscape painted by William Merritt Chase one hundred years before when he lived nearby. Also known as “Luncheon On The Grass” it is “testimony to Manet's refusal to conform to convention and his initiation of a new freedom from traditional subjects and modes of representation – can perhaps be considered as the departure point for Modern Art.

Other On The Road collaborations included, Sur Rodney Sur's, Free Advice, (2008), On the Road Headstand with Fluxus artist, Geoff Hendricks (2008), On the Road Enigma of a Litmus Test - coop d’etat with Caterina Verde and Pasha Radetzki (2010), among others.

=== When dreams collide: life, art and the pursuit of happiness ===
An investigation of timely and current issues reflected in societal transformations such as the status of women; the positioning of artists, and native peoples displaced from their ancestral lands, including The Shinnecock Indian Nation taken by the Town of Southampton in 1859, to Sandrow's chance encounter with a white Padovana cockerel on the Shinnecock Hills that he is named for (2006) to now. From the locus of Sandrow's open air studio Shinnecock Hills, Sandrow's study frames the challenges and compromises made by Shinnecock to gain shelter.

=== Genius Loci Observational Findings (2013) ===
Genius Loci Observational Findings was Sandrow's inaugural work of the Parrish Art Museum's Platform program, an experimental series of artist-driven projects. With multidisciplinary components, from performances and temporary installations to participatory events and screenings, Genius Loci inhabited the Museum from Sunday, November 4 through January 2013. Also on view were two new museum acquisitions of Sandrow's photographs.

Sandrow, whose practice often involves intensive historical research into site and place, presents works that evoke symbols of the past, new life, and good fortune, corresponding to the many cultures that have enlivened the history of the East End of Long Island.

=== Portrait of a Chicken as an Egg (Candled) within A Golden Rectangle (2017) ===
This photographic series by Sandrow of portraits of a chicken as an egg came about as an unexpected discovery in August 2017—when an egg is posed upright while candled resembles moons, planets, and stars. The subjects of Sandrow's study at the time were also by chance, when in 2006 her path crossed with the white Padovana cockerel in wooded Shinnecock Hills.

The penetrating light of "candling" reveals the condition of the egg's air cell, yolk, and albumen. That enables observation of embryonic development inside the shell.

=== Observational findings drawn in dirt (2017) ===
This is series of larg-scale photographic prints of more than forty drawings made in the dirt made by Sandrow's chickens.

=== The Fabric of Time and Space Space Time (2018) ===
A permanent installation commission created by Sandrow for the new US Embassy Jakarta (2018), from Art in Embassies Chief Curator Virginia L. Shore and Curator Claire D’Alba. This work was a creative engagement that returned Sandrow to the other side of the world: the Pacific Islands and Peoples of Bali, Flores, and Komodo. Following in the steps of her (1998) travels for the project/installation TIME(space) commissioned by Independent Curator, Andy Grundberg for the traveling exhibition In Response to Place: Place Matters (2001–2006).

=== Women's Study (room) (2020 ongoing) ===
Women's Study (room) is located within The Cottage, Sandrow's studio, on lands formerly of the Jane Borrowe Colt Estate. And since 1993 included in the Shinnecock Indian Contact Period Village Fort Critical Environmental Area within Cultural Resources Protection Overlay District one mile west of Shinnecock Indian Nation Territory. The Cottage hosts an artist residency in a Carriage House originally owned by William Merritt Chase, known for his portraits of women and more recently the summer studio/home of the American artist, Madeline Goodfriend Schonberger (born 1908).

"This is the site of the collaborative and interdisciplinary project, Nourishing Reciprocity, stemming from a relationship of reciprocity and gratitude as Sandrow has shared well over 13,000 of her Padovana flocks eggs with the Shinnecock Tribal community..." - Kelly Dennis.

Shinnecock tribal member citizens and artist siblings, Kelly Dennis and Jeremy Dennis delivered Hope's chickens' eggs to their tribal community at the emergency food tent during the COVID-19 pandemic and after. This collaboration brings a new communal resource of chickens and eggs to the Shinnecock Reservation at Ma's House.

=== On & Off The Ground: I won't carry your water, I'm not your succulent Justices Roberts, Thomas, Alito, Gorsuch, Kavanaugh, Barrett (2022) ===
A collaborative work by Hope Sandrow and fellow artist, Brianna L. Hernández, exploring concerns on climate justice, rewilding, and restoration amidst declining natural environments necessary for sustaining biodiversity and how the arts play a role in generating constructive conversation and engagement on these topics.

The work was exhibited at Jack Lenor Larsen's LongHouse Reserve in East Hampton, NY. The form references the history of LongHouse: three Orb planters hold thirty-seven planting holes corresponding to the number of years since Jack Larsen built LongHouse, and conceptually with the intention of the gardens to "serve as a living case study of the interaction between plants and people in the 21st century." The Orbs also make a visual nod to Buckminster Fuller's "The Fly's Eye Dome" permanently sited nearby.

== Collaborations ==
Sandrow's collaborations with artist colleagues and the public in art works include, The Artist & Homeless Collaborative founded with a National Endowment for the Arts - Artist Special Projects Fellowship (1990); Flag for the Nineties commissioned by Vera List; The Other Side of the Rainbow with Robin Tewes (1993); Fragments/ Self History commissioned by SECCA director Susan Lubowsky Talbott (1994–95); Material Matters Art at the Anchorage commissioned by Creative Time director Anne Pasternak (1995); Eureka, Observational Findings: Mt. Vernon Park commissioned by Contemporary Museum curated by Thom Collins and Cira Pascual Marquina (2005); open air studio Shinnecock Hills spacetime, (Re)collecting An American's Dream (READ, 2006–2008), On the Road Free Advice with Sur Rodney Sur (2008), On the Road Headstand with Geoff Hendricks (2008), On the Road Enigma of a Litmus Test - coop d’etat with Caterina Verde and Pasha Radetzki (2010); Genius Loci, commissioned by Parrish Art Museum, Curator Andrea Grover (2012–2013); (Self)Contained with Jane Iselin (2012); Gallus Gallus with Ulf Skogsbergh (2015 ongoing); Women's Study Room (2020 ongoing); Nourishing Reciprocity with Kelly, Jeremy and Denise Silva Dennis, Brianna Hernandez (2022 ongoing); I won't carry your water I'm not your Succulent with Brianna Hernandez (2023).

== Collections ==
Sandrow's work is in the permanent collections of The Museum of Modern Art, The Metropolitan Museum of Art, The Whitney Museum of American Art, The Corcoran Collection at the National Gallery of Art, The Parrish Art Museum, The New York Historical, The Houston Museum of Fine Art and other public and private collections including Eli Broad Foundation, Agnes Gund, Vera List, Geoffrey Hendricks, Sur Rodney Sur, Henry Buhl Foundation, Jeffrey Deitch and Dorothy Lichtenstein.

== Personal life ==
Sandrow lives and works in Shinnecock Hills, New York with her husband, the artist and composer, Ulf Skogsbergh. They lived in NYC (Manhattan) from 1984 to 2006.
