= Nicolas Moufarrege =

American painter and art critic (1947–1985)

- Mouffarege in 1983
- Born: March 23, 1947; Alexandria, Egypt
- Died: June 4, 1985 (aged 38); New York City, U.S.

Nicolas Abdallah Moufarrege (March 23, 1947 – June 4, 1985) was an artist, curator, and art critic. He was influential in promoting the East Village art scene of the early-1980s.

== Early life and education ==
Moufarrege was born on March 23, 1947, in Alexandria, Egypt, to Lebanese parents. He studied at the American University of Beirut, earning an undergraduate degree in 1965, followed by a graduate degree in 1968. That year, he received a Fulbright Program grant and moved to Cambridge, Massachusetts on a teaching assistantship at Harvard University.

== Career ==
"My work incorporates elements from the near and distant past, the present, and an ambitious future. It mixes classical culture with pop, images and writing, sound with mood–creating various levels of interpretation and reading. One of its basic premises is the affirmation of joy–the Truth of a planet inhabited by a romantic, sometimes intelligent species."

— Nicolas A. Moufarrege, The Clocktower exhibition catalog, 1987

Moufarrege decided to pursue a career in the arts when he discovered a love for drawing and embroidery after making a patch for a pair of his jeans. In 1973 he returned to Beirut, and his first solo exhibition was held there at Triad Condas Gallery.

Moufarrege primarily worked on stretched needlepoint canvas using thread and pigment to create vibrant scenes that utilized imagery appropriated from Pop Art, Islamic patterns, and other sources. He moved to Paris when the Lebanese Civil War broke out in 1975. Over the next several years his work was shown in both solo and group exhibitions in Beirut, London, and Amsterdam. In 1980 he had a solo exhibition at the Galeries de Varenne in Paris. He was also photographed by Peter Hujar in Paris in 1980.

=== Art criticism ===
In 1981, Moufarrege moved to New York City and became involved with the East Village art scene. Moufarrege wrote art criticism and reviews primarily for Arts Magazine and Flash Art that were instrumental in promoting galleries such as Civilian Warfare, Fun Gallery, and Gracie Mansion Gallery that established the East Village scene art. He championed the early work of artists like Greer Lankton and Rhonda Zwillinger, and he was one of the first writers to recognize the graffiti art of Futura 2000, Fab Five Freddy, IZ the Wiz, and AVANT. Moufarrege was openly gay, and his wide-ranging essays often included explorations of his identity and personal connections to the art scene that he was embedded in. One of his early pieces, "Lavender: On Homosexuality and Art," was a longform critique of the groundbreaking 1982 exhibition, Extended Sensibilities: Homosexual Presence in Contemporary Art, curated by Dan Cameron at the New Museum. During 1983 and 1984 Moufarrege wrote a seven-part series grouped under the title "The Mutant International" that used Marvel Comics and the concept of the mutant as a conceit to show how East Village artists built on the legacies of Pop Art and Neo-expressionism in creating their own styles and movement.

=== Exhibitions ===
Moufarrege had a studio at MoMA PS1 from 1982 to 1984 where he had two studio shows. His work was also exhibited in group shows there as part of the studio program. In 1983, his work was included in the show "Three Part Variety," curated by David Wojnarowicz and Richard Hambleton at the Alexander Milliken Gallery.

In 1983, Moufarrege had his first solo show in New York, "On Pins and Needles," at the Gabrielle Bryers Gallery. As a curator Moufarrege organized two group exhibitions at the Monique Knowlton Gallery, "Intoxication" and "Ecstasy", in 1983 and 1984, respectively.

== Death and legacy ==
Moufarrege died of AIDS-related complications on June 4, 1985. His second solo show opened a few days after his death at Fun Gallery. His final curatorial exhibition, "Correspondences" New York Art Now," opened later that year at the Laforet Museum in Tokyo. In 1986, Peter Hujar included one of his portraits of Moufarrege in what would be his last show at Gracie Mansion Gallery before his death.

In 1987, Tim Greathouse, Cynthia Kuebel, Elaine Reichek, and Bill Sterling organized what was then the largest exhibition of Moufarrege's work at The Clocktower gallery. In her review of the show for the New York Times, Roberta Smith noted that "Moufarrege lived long enough to become completely himself and to make art that reflects a particular time and place while also transcending them."

In 2006, Moufarrege's art was included in "The Downtown Show: The New York Art Scene, 1974-1984," held at the Grey Art Museum at New York University. Curator Dean Daderko organized the exhibition "Side X Side" for Visual AIDS at La MaMa Galleria in 2008 that included Moufarrege, Scott Burton, Kate Huh, Martin Wong, and Carrie Yamaoka. In 2019 Daderko curated Moufarrege's first solo museum exhibition, "Recognize My Sign," at the Contemporary Arts Museum Houston. The exhibition subsequently travelled to the Queens Museum. In 2023, his art was included in the exhibition, "Beirut and The Golden Sixties," at the Mathaf: Arab Museum of Modern Art. His artwork "The Fifth Day" from 1980 was included in the 2024 "Queer Histories" exhibition held at the São Paulo Museum of Art. In 2026 his art was shown at the Smithsonian Institution's National Museum of African Art in the "Here: Pride and Belonging in African Art" exhibition.
