= Gracie Mansion Gallery =

Art gallery in New York City

Gracie Mansion Gallery was an art gallery in New York City founded by artist and dealer Gracie Mansion (née Joanne Mayhew-Young). It was an important site for the Lower East Side art scene of the 1980s.

== History ==
Joanne Mayhew-Young changed her name to Gracie Mansion in 1982. Unable to find galleries that were interested in her or artist friends, Mansion decided to open her own gallery. Also in 1982, Mansion met Sur Rodney (Sur), who became her collaborator and business partner from 1983 to 1988.

The first shows organized by Mansion and Sur were staged in unconventional spaces, including a rented limousine or the bathroom at Mansion's apartment, which they called Loo Division. In the spring of 1982, the Gracie Mansion Gallery opened.

The first location of the gallery was on 9th Street between First and Avenue A. The gallery then moved to 15 St. Marks Place, and finally to 337 East 10th St. A space occupied by the gallery on Avenue A was funded in part by a loan from Citibank arranged by art dealer and curator Jeffrey Deitch.

Gracie Mansion eventually relocated to SoHo and Chelsea. Mansion closed the gallery in 2002.

== Artists ==
The first exhibition, titled the "Limo Show", was an exhibition of Buster Cleveland collages. Other early exhibitions included Tim Greathouse and Stephen Lack. Peter Hujar’s last of his rare exhibitions took place there in 1986. Mansion was instrumental in the early careers of Marilyn Minter, Al Hansen, David Wojnarowicz, Sur Rodney (Sur) and Buster Cleveland.

Other artists included Mike Bidlo, Claudia DeMonte, Rodney Alan Greenblat, Ed McGowin, David Sandlin, Hope Sandrow and Rhonda Zwillinger.

Gracie Mansion was known for organizing large group shows of artwork that was cheaper than work sold in Chelsea or SoHo.
