= Sandrow =

Sandrow is a surname. Notable people with the surname include:

- Hope Sandrow (born 1951), American conceptual artist
- Nahma Sandrow (fl. 1984), American scholar and author
