= James Casebere =

American artist and photographer

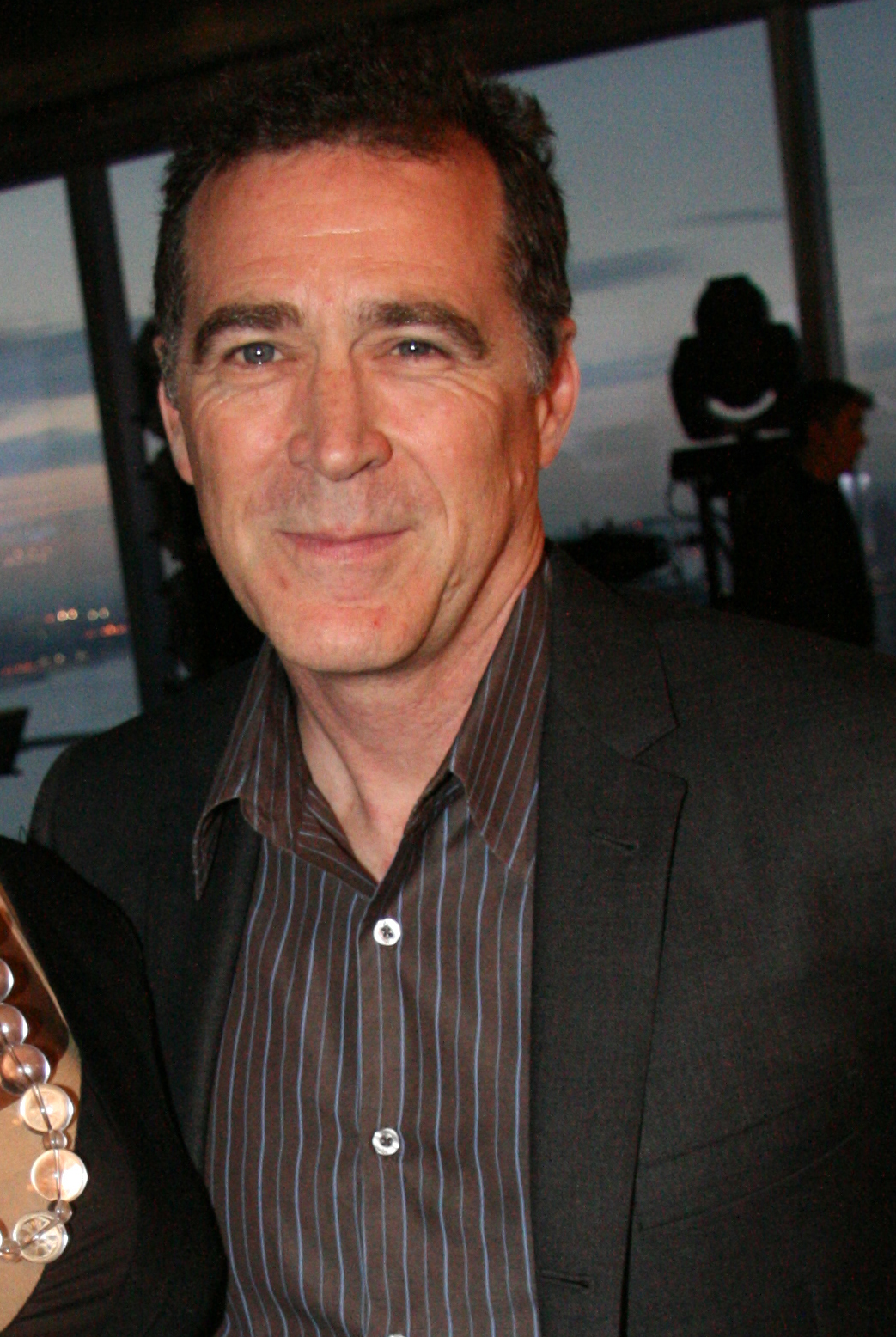
- Casebere in April 2009
- Born: 1953 (age 72–73); Lansing, Michigan
- Education: Minneapolis College of Art and Design B.F.A. CalArts M.F.A
- Known for: Photography

James Casebere (born 1953) is an American contemporary artist and photographer living in New York and Canaan, New York.

== Biography ==
Casebere, born in Lansing, Michigan, grew up outside of Detroit. He attended Michigan State University and graduated from the Minneapolis College of Art and Design with a BFA in 1976. In the fall of 1977, he attended the Whitney Independent Study Program in New York, and then moved to Los Angeles where he studied under John Baldessari and Doug Huebler. Classmates included Mike Kelley, and Tony Oursler. He received an MFA from CalArts in 1979. Casebere lives and works in New York, NY and Canaan, NY.

== Early career ==
Casebere's early exhibitions in New York were at Artists Space, Franklin Furnace and the Sonnabend Gallery. His early work is associated with the so-called “Pictures Generation” of “post-modern” artists who emerged in the 1980s. Since then, Casebere has devised complex models and photographed them in his studio. Referencing architecture, art history, and film, Casebere’s abandoned spaces are made from tabletop constructions of simple materials pared down to essential forms. Starting with Sonsbeek ’86, in Arnhem, Holland and ending around 1991, Casebere also made large scale sculptural installations.

Early bodies of work include images of the American suburban home. This was followed by both photographs and sculptural installations addressing and sometimes poking fun at a mythical American West. In the early 1990s, Casebere turned his attention to the development of different cultural institutions during The Enlightenment, and their representation as architectural types, particularly prisons. Casebere's photographs of sculptural installations suggest "an element of unreality that sparks a feeling or causes viewers to question the space and fill it with answers of their own".

== Artistic career ==
Luxor #2, 2007

Since the late 1990s Casebere has made large photographs of flooded images that refer to: 1.) the bunker under the Reichstag (Flooded Hallway) 2.) sewers in Berlin (Two Tunnels) and 3.) the Atlantic slave trade (Four Flooded Arches, Nevisian Underground, Monticello).

His work also references modern architects like Victor Horta (Spiral Staircase, and Turning Hallway) and Richard Neutra (Garage, and Dorm Room).

After 9/11, Casebere looked to Spain and the Eastern Mediterranean. His first works in this period were inspired by the 10th century Andalusia because of the co-operation between Islamic, Jewish, and Christian cultures preceding the Inquisition (La Alberca, Abadia, Spanish Bath, Mahgreb). Later images depicted Tripoli, Lebanon; Nineveh and Samarra in Iraq; and Luxor, Egypt. Several of his photographs of elaborate mosques were inspired by the 16th-century Ottoman architect Mimar Sinan.

== Exhibitions ==
Casebere was included in the 1985 Whitney Biennial. In 2002-2003 he had a solo exhibition at Southeastern Center for Contemporary Art in Winston-Salem, NC which traveled to the Museum of Contemporary Art Cleveland, OH., the Musée d'art contemporain de Montréal, Quebec and the Indianapolis Museum of Art, Indianapolis. In 2000–2001 he was in an exhibition called The Architectural Unconscious: James Casebere and Glen Seator, initiated by the Addison Gallery of American Art at Phillips Academy in Andover, Massachusetts, which traveled to the Institute of Contemporary Art, Philadelphia PA. In 1999 Asylum, another solo exhibition at the Museum of Modern Art, Oxford, England, traveled to Centro Galego de Arte Contemporanea, Santiago de Compostela, Spain, and the Sainsbury Centre for Visual Arts, Norwich, England. In 1996 he was in Campo, at the Venice Biennale, Italy, curated by Francesco Bonami, which traveled to the Sandretto Foundation in Torino, Italy and the Konstmuseum, in Malmö, Sweden.

The Haus der Kunst exhibited Fugitive, a large-scale survey show of Casebere's work, February–June 2016.

The Centre for Fine Arts, Brussels ("Bozar") displayed After Scale Model: Dwelling in the Work of James Casebere in 2016.

Casebere's newest body of work, Emotional Architecture, debuted at Sean Kelly Gallery in 2017, and was then exhibited at Galería Helga de Alvear in 2017–2018 and at Galerie Templon in Brussels.

== Awards ==
Casebere is the recipient of three fellowships from the National Endowment for the Arts, three from the New York Foundation for the Arts and one from the John Simon Guggenheim Memorial Foundation in 1995. Casebere was elected as one of 12 artists and architects to the National Academicians Class of 2026.

== Collections ==
Casebere's work is held in the public collections of Hammer Museum and the Guggenheim Museum, New York.

== General references ==
- Chang, Chris, Jeffrey Eugenides, and Anthony Vidler. James Casebere, The Spatial Uncanny. Charta, 2001.
- Casebere, James and Glen Seater. The Architectural Unconscious. Addison Gallery of American Art, 2000
- Drohojowska-Philip, Hunter. “Art and Architecture. Lessons From One Man’s Model Society.” Los Angeles Times May 21, 2000. p. 57–58.
- Berger, Maurice and Andy Grundberg. James Casebere, Model Culture: Photographs 1975-1996. Friends of Photography, 1996.
- Ziolkowski, Thad. “James Casebere, Michael Klein Gallery.” Artforum September, 1995.
- Foster, Hal. "Uncanny Images.” Art In America November 1983. p. 202–204.
