= Southeastern Center for Contemporary Art =

Coordinates: 36.11995°N 80.28991°W

The Southeastern Center for Contemporary Art (SECCA) was a multimedia contemporary art gallery in Winston-Salem, North Carolina. It became a division of the North Carolina Museum of Art in 2007.

Founded as a private institution, SECCA had no permanent collection but offered exhibitions of works by artists with regional, national, and international recognition. Admission was free. SECCA was accredited by the American Alliance of Museums (AAM) in 1979.

== History ==
SECCA was founded in 1956 as the Winston-Salem Gallery of Fine Arts in Old Salem. James Gordon Hanes of the locally prominent Hanes family, who died in 1972, bequeathed his Norman Revival home built in 1929 and grounds to the gallery. The home was augmented with purpose-built exhibition space, and SECCA moved to the new location in 1977 under its current name. In 1990 the facility expanded again.

SECCA was the subject of national political and media notoriety in 1989 when 23 U.S. Senators signed a letter challenging its involvement, along with the National Endowment for the Arts, with a $15,000 arts prize awarded to controversial photographer Andres Serrano. Former U.S. Senators Jesse Helms (R-NC) and Alfonse D'Amato (R-NY) denounced SECCA in speeches on the floor of the Senate, taking particular issue with what has become Serrano's most famous work, "Piss Christ," a photograph of a crucifix submerged in the artists's urine.

== Artist and the Community series ==
This landmark community series began in 1994 as a staff driven initiative, under the direction of director Susan Talbot Labowsky. AOC brought nationally-acclaimed artists to Winston Salem to work with community organizations and individuals on issues pertinent to the area. Residencies lasted from two weeks to a year. Artists included Donald Lipski, Willie Birch, Hope Sandrow, Eleanor Antin, Maya Lin, Mr. Imagination, Inigo Manglano-Ovalle, Tim Rollins and K.O.S. (Kids of Survival).

== The HOME House Project: the future of affordable housing ==
Beginning in 2004, this multi-year, international initiative greatly expanded the Artist and the Community series. Artists, designers, and architects were invited to re-envision Habitat for Humanity's basic two-and-three bedroom homes, making them affordable, using energy-efficient and green/sustainable materials and technologies. Open to all, more than 800 individuals and teams from the U.S and 16 countries registered for the project, garnering more than 400 innovative housing designs. An exhibition traveled to ten venues including the Fredrich Weisman Museum of Art, the Contemporary Arts Center, Cincinnati, El Paso Museum of Art, the Neighborhood Housing Services of Asheville (in cnojunction with the Asheville Art Museum, and the Green Building Council) and others.

== Notes ==
Financial difficulties that began in 2003 forced SECCA to convey its property and operations to the state in 2007.

There have been many curators over the years including Jeff Fleming, Ron Platt, David J. Brown, Steven Matijcio, Cora Fisher, and others. Exhibitions since 2010 include works by Tomory Dodge, Jennifer West, Stanislav Libenský and Jaroslava Brychtová, Alison Elizabeth Taylor, Clark Whittington, Mark Jenkins, and Lee Walton.
