= Caterina Verde =

French and American artist

- Born: Kathryn Greene
- Known for: conceptual art, installation art, video, photography, drawing, painting, text work
- Website: Official website

Caterina Verde (born Kathryn Greene) is a visual artist of both American and French nationalities who currently lives and works in New York City.

Verde's work is a cross platform of media that incorporates video and installation-style situations with text works, but not exclusively. She uses photography, drawing, performance, painting, and objects as integral components of the work. For a period she worked actively making light works, which were shown extensively during the early 1990s. Her aesthetic concerns are psychologically and historically based.

Verde is also known as a curator, and a video director. As Kathryn Greene, she is known for her years as the Performance Art and Hybrid curator at The Kitchen, a non-profit, multi-disciplinary art and performance space in downtown Manhattan, New York City.

== Work ==
Verde began her career primarily as a painter. In the late 1980s, through to the late 1990s, she was part of the early scene in Williamsburg, Brooklyn.

Verde was an early proponent of using computers for art-making purposes; she began making large format, free-standing sculptural works from images that were manipulated in the computer. She used the same technique to produce light works, which were featured as part of the "Leonardo Gallery" in Leonardo Volume 28, 1995. They were also part of a traveling exhibition organized by Michael Dashkin.

Verde's work is centered around perceptual, psychological, and linguistic twists. Her photographs and video works incorporate text, and are often presented in installation form. As Matthew Rose (a freelance journalist and artist who has written for The New York Times and The Wall Street Journal) commented in 2004:

When viewing Verde's work -- a range of video, painting, photography and photomontage — I am often reminded of my ability to “see” anything at all, for there is in her artistic enterprise an affective inward and outward movement, an aesthetic inhaling and exhaling, with overtones of the apocalypse. In her multi-media works, Verde traps the poignancy of evanescence, of something about to happen, or what it looks like after it has happened: the trace of an event, or the after-murmur of the heart.

=== Projects in collaboration ===
Verde has collaborated with other artists, including: the French choreographer, Daria Fain on the "Commoning" project with Robert Kocik, and "Germ", a performance for which Verde did the video; the American/Belarus performance artist Pasha Radetzki, with whom she performed in 2012 at dOCUMENTA 13, under the auspices of Critical Art Ensemble's curatorial initiative. She also worked with Radetzki on "Enigma of a Litmus Test", which was part of a live stream at artist, Hope Sandrow's, "On the Road Open Air Gallery."

Another collaboration, for "Confinement and the Art of Decoration", was with the German sculptor Gloria Zein, and the Norwegian artist, Elise Martens. This project stemmed from Verde's years in Paris, and was initially produced at Artspace in New Haven, Connecticut.

=== Commentary on the work ===
Ebon Fisher, when describing Verde's work, said:

Caterina continuously pushes back and forth between curatorial projects and formal creative expression, agitating numerous lines between the two."

Matthew Rose, a freelance journalist, described Verde's work in this way:

Verde (aka Kathryn Greene) captures emptiness while choreographing her images in a kind of cross-pollination of absences. The works are an exhumation of waiting and those anxious moments--the visual moments--affixed to that emotional state."

== Curatorship ==
=== The Kitchen ===
Verde (as Kathryn Greene) was the Hybrid and Performance Art Curator at The Kitchen in New York City, from 1994 to 1997. This period in the mid-1990s was an uncertain time for The Kitchen, as it had lost most of its funding. Verde's curatorial programming included a series called "Hybrid Nights”.

The artists that Verde curated at The Kitchen included: OM2 - Nocturnal Architecture; Cook County Theater Department; Shelly Mars; Fiona Templeton; David Hykes; Jackson Mac Low and Anne Tardos; Brendan de Vallance; Mike Ballou; Alexander Viscio; Jens Brand; Alexandre Perigot; Daria Fain; Terrence Mintern; Cabaret of Cruelty; Ham and Egg; and Geoff Selinger.

Verde left The Kitchen to accept a two-year residency in Paris through the American Center in Paris's artist residency program at the Cité internationale des arts.

=== Antenna TV ===
In the early 1990s, Verde co-directed and produced an artist's television show called Antenna TV, with Anney Bonney. Twelve episodes were produced for public access TV. The show debuted at the club The Cooler, on West 14th Street. The artists on Antenna TV included: Mike Ballou, Fred Tomaselli; Sylvie Degiez and Wayne Lopes, Taylor Mead; Wright Thomas; Michael McClard; Peter McClard; Ruth Kahn; and Al Arthur. The Bomb magazine website has a video excerpt from Antenna TV, featuring a reading by the poet, David Rattray, who died in 1993. In the excerpt Rattray reads his poem "Mr. Peacock".

=== Strange Positioning Systems ===
More recently, Verde spearheaded an online performance site, "Strange Positioning Systems”, which was initiated from a grant from Artspace in New Haven, Connecticut. Strange Positioning Systems has several artists working internationally, and has provided live streams for performance works including Alexander Viscio's "Inside Verbal Seed", with the Museum of Contemporary Art, Zagreb.

== Photography and video ==
Verde is also known for her photographic work of other artists and their work, such as Keith Sonnier.

To this end, her photographs have appeared in numerous publications including The New York Times, Le Figaro, and the East Hampton Star.

Her photographs have also appeared in the following books for Sonnier's exhibitions:

- Keith Sonnier, Portals, published by Karma and Keith Sonnier, 2015 (ISBN 978-1-942607-17-5)
- Keith Sonnier, Elliptical Transmissions, published by Tripoli Gallery 2014 (ISBN 978-1-4951-2014-5)
- Keith Sonnier, Elysian Plain + Early Works, published by Pace Gallery 2014 (ISBN 978-1-935410-51-5)

She also made a short biographical film on Keith Sonnier and his work, as well having edited, directed and shot many other short documentary-style videos.

Verde has also done extensive photography for Robert Wilson’s Watermill Center, in Watermill, New York.

== Life history ==
Verde's great-grandfather, Samuel Mott, was a scientist and inventor who worked with Thomas Edison. Mott invented and held the patent for the first electric scoreboard, and he also held the patent on the glass insulators that were used on power lines for most of the 20th century. Verde's grandfather, Kenneth Greene, was a billboard painter who had a studio in Times Square; he was also the art director of the Roxy Theatre. Verde's step-grandfather, Robert Washburn, was also an artist; he lived many years in Mexico.

Verde was married to guitarist John McCurry for a number of years. She has a child, Madeleine Hykes, with musician/composer David Hykes.
