= Ed McGowin =

American artist

- Born: William Edward McGowin; June 2, 1938; Hattiesburg, Mississippi
- Education: University of Southern Mississippi, University of Alabama
- Known for: Painting, Drawing, Sculpture
- Movement: Conceptual Art, Minimalism, Abstract Art

Ed McGowin (born 1938) is an American painter and sculptor based in New York City. Throughout his career, McGowin has produced works in a wide variety of media that have been installed and exhibited in galleries, museums and public spaces. He has taught at institutions such as the Corcoran School of the Arts and Design, the University of Southern Mississippi, and the State University of New York system. The first major publication of his work, Name Change: One Artist – Twelve Personas – Thirty Five Years, was published by the Mobile Museum of Art in 2006 and distributed by the University Press of Mississippi.

== Life ==
William Edward McGowin was born in Hattiesburg, Mississippi, in 1938. He received his B.A. at the University of Southern Mississippi and his M.A. from the University of Alabama. In 1962, McGowin moved to Washington D.C. where he served as an aid to Mississippi Democratic Rep. William M. Colmer and continued to make art. That same year, McGowin established the McGowin-Bright Art School in Alexandria, Virginia, which served as both an art school and supply shop. Shortly after, McGowin returned to the South to carry out a teaching fellowship and complete a master's degree in painting at University of Alabama. In 1976, McGowin moved to New York City where he continues to live and work.

McGowin is married to artist, curator and educator Claudia DeMonte. He lives and works in both New York City and Miami Beach, Florida. He has two children, Leah McGowin Thomas and Jill McGowin who both reside in San Antonio.

== Work ==
Initially trained as a painter, McGowin quickly began experimenting across media. His paintings, sculptures, conceptual art projects, films, writings, and public art installations have a southern sensibility rooted in his early experiences in Mississippi and Alabama. Consistent with his university training, McGowin's work began with an abstract focus. Within art history, his art from the mid-1960s became associated with a second generation of artists working within the archetypes of the Washington Color School. McGowin also pioneered the used of vacuum-forming to create distinct abstract forms in a variety of new materials.

=== Giveaway (1969) ===
In 1969, McGowin, Douglas Davis and Gene Davis collectively hosted a Give Away on Thursday, May 22, 1969 from 9pm – 11pm in the Grand Ballroom at the Mayflower Hotel. At the event, fifty names were drawn with each winner receiving a copy of Gene Davis’s 1969 6'x6' painting “Popsicle”.

=== Name Change (1970–1972) ===
From 1970 to 1972, McGowin changed his name twelve times and created art under each name before returning to his own. Attempting to deviate from the linearity of art history and artist narratives, Name Change allowed McGowin “to be free to make carnival turnaround, to change his approach, and creative position, as he felt was right.”

Name Changes:

- Alva Isaiah Fost
- Lawrence Steven Orlean
- Irby Benjamin Roy
- Nathan Ellis McDuff
- Euri Ignatious Everpure
- Isaac Noel Anderson
- Nicholas Gregory Nazianzen
- Thorton Modestus Dossett
- Ingram Andrew Young
- Melvill Douglass O’Connor
- Edward Everett Updike
- William Edward McGowin

== Museum collections ==
McGowin's works are found in several important museum collections including: Whitney Museum of American Art, Hirshhorn Museum and Sculpture Garden, The Phillips Collection, Solomon R. Guggenheim Museum, Rock and Roll Hall of Fame, Indianapolis Museum of Art, among others. In 1998, McGowin donated his papers, which include professional correspondence, project files relating to outdoor sculpture commissions, sketchbooks, photographs and printed materials including exhibition catalogs, art periodicals, and clippings, to the Archives of American Art.

== Permanent commissions ==
McGowin has designed permanent works using materials such as cast stone, bronze and terra cotta. His commissions include sculptures for University of Northern Iowa, Pennsylvania Horticultural Society, Dallas Area Rapid Transit, Metropolitan Transportation Authority, New Mexico Department of Transportation, City of Rockville, Maryland, among others.

== Exhibitions ==
=== Selected solo exhibitions ===
- 1962 – Corcoran Gallery of Art, Washington, D.C
- 1968 – Martha Jackson Gallery, New York
- 1974 – Pyramid Gallery, Washington, D.C.
- 1974 – American Cultural Center, Paris, FR
- 1975 – Corcoran Gallery of Art, Washington, D.C.
- 1985 – Gracie Mansion Gallery, New York
- 1987 – Center for Fine Arts, Miami, FL
- 1989 – Gracie Mansion Gallery, New York

=== Selected group exhibitions ===
- 1964 – Nine Contemporary Painters, USA, Pan American Union Building, Washington, D.C.
- 1966 – Annual Exhibition: Contemporary Sculpture and Prints, Whitney Museum of American Art, New York
- 1968 – Annual Exhibition: Contemporary American Sculpture, Whitney Museum of American Art, New York
- 1969 – A Plastic Presence, The Jewish Museum, New York
- 1974 – Painting and Sculpture Today, Indianapolis Museum of Art, Indianapolis, IN
- 1975 – Gulf Coast, East Coast, West Coast, Contemporary Arts Museum Houston, Houston, TX
- 1982 – Art 1982 Chicago, Navy Pier, Chicago, IL
- 1985 – Precious: An American Cottage Industry of the Eighties, NYU Grey Art Gallery, New York
- 1990 – The Tradition of Caritas in Painting, Sherry French Gallery, NY
- 1994 – Thirty Something: A 30th Anniversary Celebration, Mobile Museum of Art, Mobile, AL
- 2006 – International and National Projects Fall 2006, MoMA PS1, New York
- 2007 – The Mississippi Story, Mississippi Museum of Art, Jackson, MS
