= Claudia DeMonte =

American sculptor

- Born: 1947 (age 78–79); Astoria, New York
- Education: Catholic University of America
- Known for: Mixed media art, Sculpture, Installations
- Spouse: Ed McGowin (m.1977)

Claudia DeMonte (born 1947) is an American mixed media artist known for her exploration of "contemporary women’s roles" and world cultures through her eclectic sculptures, collages, digital prints, and installations. Her work is influenced by growing up Catholic and the lavish trappings and rituals of Catholicism. Other significant interests and themes in her work include outsider art, "globalism, identity politics, feminism, and social responsibility," which have been shaped by her world travels as much as her awareness of social issues.

== Early life ==
Claudia DeMonte was born in 1947 in Astoria, New York. She was raised in an ethnically diverse neighborhood where she had a traditional Italian upbringing and strong Catholic education. Her father was an insurance broker and honorary mayor of Astoria before becoming a city councilman. DeMonte's mother, Ammeda Heiss DeMonte, was an assistant buyer and "Miss Hub" for the Hub department store in Baltimore before she married and moved to New York where she became a community activist and vice chair of Community Board One.

== Education ==
DeMonte received her Bachelor of Arts in art history from College of Notre Dame of Maryland (in 1969 and her MFA from the Catholic University of America in 1971. During her time at university, DeMonte was influenced by art historian Ruth Watkins and textile artist Nell Sonnemann as both women were independent, well-traveled, tall, and had no children.

== Personal life ==
DeMonte married Ed McGowin, a fellow artist, in 1977. She currently lives and works in New York City and Miami, Florida.

== Career ==
DeMonte became interested in conceptual art early in her career and was so impacted by Art Povera that she wrote a letter to Germano Celant asking to study with him. While at college, she was expected to focus on creating traditional types of art. Instead she conceived interactive exhibits, in which she traded T-shirts with her name based on the Delmonte logo, hand-decorated photos of herself, and objects that she collected. Requiring audience participation in order to work, her trading shows proved highly successful with her exhibition at the Baltimore Museum breaking an "attendance record at the time." Her first major break came when she was included in Jane Livingston's Liberation: Fourteen American Women Artists show that toured in Europe and Five Plus One, in which DeMonte was the "Plus One" as she was the only non-painter in the show.

In 1976, DeMonte returned to "using [her] hands" and began to make dolls. Her work was always "autobiographical" and "personal" as it often dealt with her family and growing up. That same year, DeMonte moved back to New York with McGowin after coming to the realization that the art scene in Washington, D.C. was not held in the same high regard as politics and was often seen as less than or "secondary". As a New Yorker, she also missed the "excitement" and "anonymity" that the city provided. While she had made connections, garnering interest and support in her work from the likes of gallerist Ron Feldman and Doug Davis after her one-person show at the Corcoran Gallery of Art, she struggled to gain a foothold in the New York art scene. There was a prevalent attitude that only New York museums and galleries carried any weight which DeMonte had not anticipated.

In 1977, returning to Queens, DeMonte rented a studio at P.S. 1 that furthered her connection with the New York art world. Her first significant press coverage came in the summer of 1980 after she had a reproduction in a group show. Determined to succeed in the New York art scene, she continued to take part in group shows that were often held at "alternative spaces". DeMonte's breakthrough finally came in 1983 after she joined Gracie Mansion’s successful new art gallery that was supportive of what she was trying to accomplish.

By the mid-1980s, the East Village art scene was flourishing and DeMonte was exhibiting her work nationally and internationally. During this time her artwork took on a new "universal" dimension while maintaining its deeply autobiographical qualities. This artistic development was facilitated by the extensive travel DeMonte undertook with McGowin. In a 1991 Smithsonian interview with Liza Kirwin, DeMonte stated that during the proceeding ten years, they had visited 50 countries and that a trip to the Deep South around 1985 furthered their interest in folk art and influenced her work and the materials she used.

DeMonte took on several notable projects in the 2000s. In 2000, she curated a collection of female artist works from 177 countries whose artwork depicted their personal understanding of what "woman" meant. Women of the World: A Global Collection of Art resulted in a 22-venue tour and a book published by Pomegranate. From 2000-2007, DeMonte's touring exhibition Real Beauty: A Celebration of Diversity and Global Culture, a collection of 140 traditional, handmade dolls by woman artists from around the world, explored the beauty standards and broader culture of each artist as well as the impact of globalism and mass-production on such objects.

Pomegranate released Claudia DeMonte in 2009 to accompany a retrospective tour of her work. The career monograph contained an essay by Eleanor Heartney, a contributing editor to Art in America and art press. The foreword was by president emerita of the Museum of Modern Art, Agnes Gund.

== Teaching ==
DeMonte taught at the University of Maryland for 33 years. During her tenure, she was a recipient of the Distinguished Scholar Teacher Award in 1997 and the Students Award for Excellence in Teaching. She was named professor emerita when she retired in 2004. From 1980 until 1990, DeMonte was also in charge of the Art Workshop program at the New School for Social Research.

== Exhibitions ==
Claudia DeMonte has more than 100 solo and 500 group exhibitions. Her work is also held in numerous private, public, and corporate collections around the world.

=== Select solo exhibitions ===
- 2020
- June Kelly Gallery, New York, N.Y.
- 2019
- Binomial: Claudia DeMonte & Ed McGowin, Lowe Art Museum, Miami, FL
- 2018
- Memento Vivere: Sculpture and Installations, June Kelly Gallery, New York
- PARTNERS: Claudia DeMonte and Ed McGowin, Mattatuck Museum, Waterbury, CT
- Cape Cod Museum, Dennis, MA
- 2017
- Celebrating 30 Years: Group Show Gallery Artists Drawings and Photographs, June Kelly Gallery, New York
- 2016
- Memory Keepers: Sculpture and Installations, June Kelly Gallery, New York
- The Art of Making the Invisible Visible: A Retrospective by Claudia DeMonte, Sarah Isom Center for Women and Gender Studies at the University of Mississippi, University MS
- 2014
- Claudia DeMonte: La Forza del Destino, June Kelly Gallery, New York
- A Woman’s Work is Never Done, Five Points Gallery, Torrington, CT
- Claudia DeMonte, Cullis Wade Depot Art Gallery, Mississippi State University, Starkville, MS
- 2012
- Abundance: Sculpture/Installation, June Kelly Gallery, New York
- 2011
- Claudia DeMonte: Retrospective, Cora Miller Gallery, York College of Pennsylvania
- Claudia DeMonte: Real Beauty, Cecille R. Hunt Gallery, Webster University, St. Louis, MO
- Self and the Everywoman: Mixed Media Works by Claudia DeMonte, Trustman Art Gallery, Simmons College, Boston, MA
- CLAUDIA DEMONTE - OPERA di DONNA, Marsh Hall, University of Southern Mississippi Museum of Art, Hattiesburg, MS
- 2010
- Claudia DeMonte, Nordstrand Gallery, Wayne State University, Wayne, NE
- Mapping Beauty, Mobile Museum of Art, Mobile, AL
- Real Beauty, Katzen Center for the Arts, American University, Washington, DC
- Claudia DeMonte, Heffernan Gallery, West Valley Art Museum, Surprise, AZ
- Claudia DeMonte: Mapping Beauty, Sarah Moody Gallery of Art, The University of Alabama, Tuscaloosa, AL
- The Luxury of Exercise: Small Sculpture and Works on Paper by Claudia DeMonte, Mississippi Museum of Art, Jackson, MS
- 2009
- Claudia DeMonte: The Luxury of Exercise, June Kelly Gallery, New York, monograph with an essay by Eleanor Heartney and foreword by Agnes Gund, published by Pomegranate Books, San Francisco, CA
- Claudia DeMonte and Ed McGowin, Jan Colle Gallery, Ghent, Belgium
- Claudia DeMonte: Retrospective, University of New Haven, West Haven, CT
- Everyday Matters, Flint Institute of Arts, MI
- 2008
- Claudia DeMonte: Real Beauty, Kasser Family Exhibition, The Gottesman Libraries, Teachers College, Columbia University, New York
- 2007
- Empowered Objects: New Sculpture, June Kelly Gallery, New York
- Claudia DeMonte: Mapping Beauty, Holzhauer Gallery, Mattie Kelly Fine and Performing Arts Center, Okaloosa-Walton College, Niceville, FL
- Mapping Beauty: 3 decades of installations, Makan Gallery, Amman, Jordan
- 2006
- A Couple of Litchfield County Artists, Silo Gallery, New Milford, CT
- Claudia DeMonte: A Silhouette, Selected Works, 1976–2005, University of Maryland, College Park, MD
- Claudia DeMonte, Women’s Art Gallery, Cincinnati, OH
- 2005
- Claudia DeMonte, Contemporary Art Center, New Orleans, LA
- Claudia DeMonte, Cole Pratt Gallery, New Orleans, LA
- 2004
- Retrospective, Tallinn Kunstihoone, Tallinn, Estonia
- Claudia DeMonte, Gerdunberg Cultural Center, Reykjavik, Iceland
- Personal Journeys, Salem College, Winston Salem, NC
- 2003
- Female Fetishes, International Museum of Women, San Francisco, CA
- Claudia DeMonte, Spring Hill College, Mobile, AL
- Claudia DeMonte, Brenau University, Gainesville, GA
- Claudia DeMonte, Cole Pratt Gallery, New Orleans, LA
- 2002
- Female Fetishes, Museum of the Southwest, Midland, TX
- 2001
- Claudia DeMonte: New Work, Arguibel Gallery, Buenos Aires, Argentina
- Female Fetishes, Tucson Museum of Art, Tucson, AZ
- Claudia DeMonte: Retrospective, Rosemont College, PA
- Female Fetishes, University of New England, Portland, ME
- The Queen’s Dream: Site Specific, Islip Art Museum, East Islip, NY
- 2000
- Claudia DeMonte Female Implements, Flint Institute of Art, MI
- 1999
- Female Fetishes, Gallery Liesbeth Lips, Rotterdam, The Netherlands
- 1998
- Claudia DeMonte: Retrospective, Chokladfabriken, Malmo, Sweden
- Female Fetishes, Ambleside Gallery, Richmond, VA
- 1997
- Female Fetishes, Genkan Gallery, Tokyo, Japan
- Female Implements, Silpakorn University, Bangkok, Thailand
- Claudia DeMonte, Gateway Center, Prudential Plaza, Newark, NJ
- 1996
- Domestique, Leedy Voulkos Gallery, Kansas City, MO
- Female Implements: Serving Objects, Panorama Gallery, Winchester School of Art, Barcelona, Spain
- 1995
- Housewives, Xochipilli Gallery, Birmingham, MI
- 1994
- New Work, Barbara Gillman Gallery, Miami, FL
- Significant Losses, The Art Gallery, University of Maryland, College Part, MD
- 1993
- Female Fetishes, Nina Freudenheim Gallery, Buffalo, NY
- 1992
- Objects of a Woman's Life, Jones/Troyer Fitzpatrick Gallery, Washington, DC
- 1991
- Claudia DeMonte, Gallery 86, Lodz, Poland
- 1989
- Claudia DeMonte/Ed McGowin, Falcon Gallery, Riyada, Saudi Arabia
- Shrines, Gracie Mansion Gallery, New York
- 1988
- Amphora, Jones/Troyer Gallery, Washington, DC
- 1986
- New Work: Two Installations, Xochipilli Gallery, Birmingham, MI
- Windows, Grey Art Gallery, New York University
- 1985
- Claudia at Home & Abroad, Gracie Mansion Gallery, New York
- 1983
- Russell Sage Gallery, Albany, NY
- 1982
- Shipka Gallery, Sofia, Bulgaria
- 1981
- Marion Locks Gallery, Philadelphia, PA
- 1980
- Mississippi Museum of Art, Jackson, MS
- Fort Worth Museum, Fort Worth, Texas
- 1979
- Marianne Deson Gallery, Chicago, IL
- 1978
- Trade Piece, Contemporary Art Center, New Orleans; Baltimore Museum of Art; Franklin Furnace, New York City, NY; American Cultural Center, Paris
- 1977
- Corcoran Gallery of Art, Washington D.C.

=== Select group exhibitions ===
- Un Incontro a Venezia, Archivo, Emily Harvey, Venice, Italy
- 50 Works from the Vogel Collection:
- Honolulu Museum of Art, Hawaii
- Portland Museum of Art
- Mississippi Museum of Art
- Marjorie Barrick Museum of Art, University of Nevada, Las Vegas
- University of Michigan Art Museum, Ann Arbor
- Atrium Gallery, St. Louis, Missouri
- Markers 8: Mapping, Art life for the World Gallery, Venice, Italy
- Journee Internationale de la femme, UNESCO, Paris, France
- Beauty, University of Wisconsin, Milwaukee, Wisconsin
- 14 American Artists, Aarhus Museum, Denmark
- American Artists, Arseanle de Repulbica, Amalfi, Italy
- American Narrative Art, Contemporary Art Museum, Houston, Texas
- Biennial, Indianapolis Museum
- Comic Description of Sex in Contemporary Art, Gallery Im Haus 19, Munich, Germany
- HOME, Contemporary Art Museum, São Paulo
- International Paper Biennial Duren Museum, Germany
- Markers Project, Via Garibaldi, Venice, Italy
- Model Home, The Stanley Picher Gallery, Kingston University, Surrey, England
- New Painting New York, P.S. l, New York
- New York Now, Espo Museum, Finland
- Site Specific, Islip Museum
- The New York Scene, Liesbeth Lips Gallery, Rotterdam, the Netherlands
- Third International Biennial of Graphic Arts, Bitola, Macedonia

=== Projects ===
- 2019-20 The World is a Handkerchief, curated by Cecilia Mandrile and Claudia DeMonte, touring exhibition
- 2015 Between the Lines: A Coloring Book by Contemporary Artists, Volume 5
- 2000-07 Real Beauty: A Celebration of Diversity and Global Culture, touring exhibition
- 2000-07 Women of the World: A Global Collection of Art, national and international exhibition

=== Select public collections ===
- Bass Museum
- Boca Raton Museum
- Brooklyn Museum of Art
- Corcoran Gallery of Art
- Delaware Art Museum
- Flint Institute of Arts
- Fort Lauderdale Museum
- Indianapolis Museum of Art
- The Katzen Arts Center, American University, Washington, DC
- Lowe Art Museum, University of Miami
- Marjorie Barrick Museum of Art, University of Nevada
- Mattatuck Museum
- Minnesota Museum of American Art
- Mississippi Museum
- Mobile Museum of Art
- New Orleans Museum of Art
- Ogden Museum
- Queens Museum
- Stamford Museum
- University of Michigan Museum of Art

== Honors and awards ==
DeMonte has been the recipient of numerous honors and awards.

- 2014 Winner, The Fabergé Big Egg Hunt for "Golden Egg," New York City
- 2014 "Best in Feminist Art & Scholarship" for the exhibition "La Forza del Destino" by the CAA Committee on Women in the Arts, New York
- 2006 Doctor of Humane Letters, Honoris, Causa, College of Santa Fe. NM
- 2005 Professor Emerita, University of Maryland, College Park, MD
- Grant, Ennessi Foundation, Saudi Arabia
- Grant, Cantor Family Foundation, New York
- 2003 Art Award, Mobile Museum of Art, AL
- 1999 Grant, Anchorage Foundation Inc. of Texas, Houston. TX
- Arts Award Grant, Creative and Performing, University of Maryland, College Park, MD
- Arts Award, Euro-American Women’s Council, Athens, Greece
- 1998 Design Award for "Installation of The Wheel of Justice by Claudia DeMonte & Ed McGowan," City of New York
- 1997 Distinguished Scholar/Teacher, University of Maryland, College Park, MD
- 1989 New York Foundation for the Arts Fellowship, Sculpture
- Ariana Foundation for the Arts, Percent for Art
- Cite Des Arts Residency, Paris, France (date unknown)
- U.S. Representative, International Women's Art Conference, Kingston, Jamaica (date unknown)

== Commissions ==
- 2006-08 Commitment to Valor, Courageous Rescue, Bravery for Others, and Heroic Protectors, Broward County Fire Rescue, Florida Cultural Society, Ft. Lauderdale, FL
- 2004-06 Santa Rosa Fountain, commissioned for the city of Santa Rosa by New Mexico State Arts, Santa Rosa, NM
- 2002-04 We Are One, University of Northern Iowa, Iowa City, IA
- 2001 Untitled, commissioned by Peter Marino, Architect, PLLC, Palm Beach, FL
- 1998 Socorro Wheel of History, commissioned by New Mexico State Arts, Socorro, NM
- Wheel of Justice, commissioned by the New York City Department of Cultural Affairs, Queens Supreme Court, Flushing Meadows
- 1993 Animal Count, commissioned by Percent for Art Program of the New York City Department of Cultural Affairs/School Construction Authority, Queens
- 1992 Fantasy Travels, Prudential Life Insurance, Parsippany, NJ
- Claudia DeMonte Ceramic Tableware, Grazia Studios, Deruta, Italy
- 1990 Shrine to Learning, Clarendon Public Library, commissioned by Brooklyn Public Library System, Percent for Art Program of the New York City and Department of Cultural Affairs, NY
- 1984 Untitled, sculpture, Hyatt Regency Hotel, Crystal City, VA
- 1981 Travel Fantasy, Prudential Life Insurance, Parsippany, NJ
- 1972 Untitled, Philadelphia Museum of Art, PA
- 1970 Mural, Bladen Hall, Prince George’s Community College, Largo, MD Mural, Astoria Park, Queens, New York City Park Department
