= Sur Rodney (Sur) =

Canadian artist, writer, and archivist, active in New York City (born 1954)

- Born: December 28, 1954 (age 71); Montreal, Canada

Sur Rodney (Sur) (born December 28, 1954, Montreal) is a Canadian-born writer and archivist who preserves the legacies of artists with HIV and AIDS. He co directed Gracie Mansion Gallery alongside Gracie Mansion in the 1980s, and was a performer and curator in the downtown New York arts scene of the 1980s and 90s.

== Education and move to New York ==
After graduating from the Montreal Museum School of Fine Art and Design in 1976, Sur moved to New York, where he worked in kitchens and print studios while quickly gaining footing in the New York art world. From 1978 to 1979 he curated exhibitions of artists such as Jimmy De Sana, Marcia Resnick, and Gerard Malanga at the Viewing Room Galleries and Hansen Gallery. In 1980, Sur joined the Blackheart Collective of Black gay poets, and continued to perform with Other Countries, a later evolution of the collective. He interviewed artists for his Sur Rodney Show and the All New Sur Rodney (Sur) Show: talk shows broadcast on television and screened at The Mudd Club in New York City starting in 1980.

== Career ==
=== Gallerist and curator ===
In 1982, Sur Rodney (Sur) began to work with Gracie Mansion on a 10th street gallery after receiving a year's rent for the storefront under the condition that the two would co direct the space. Considered a crucial space in the downtown New York art world of the '80s and '90s, Gracie Mansion Gallery held many experimental, avant-garde events. In Gary Indiana's words, "Some of the gallerists in the new scene were arguably more interesting than the painters […] Gracie Mansion and her partner, Sur Rodney (Sur), stood out". Legally married, Gracie Mansion and Sur's long business marriage shocked many in the surrounding social and cultural world.

In 1999, Carlo McCormick writing in Artforum described the legacy of Gracie Mansion Gallery, writing "The success of Gracie Mansion Gallery in the mid-80s was so phenomenal it seemed Mansion and Sur could sell just about anything. But the key was less salesmanship than the sheer force of personality and the inspired intangibles of creativity run amok."

In the early 1990s after leaving Gracie Mansion Gallery, Sur worked as curator and archivist at the Kenkeleba House, a nonprofit gallery dedicated to showing Black artists.

=== Archival and activism work ===
Sur left Gracie Mansion Gallery in 1988 as the AIDS epidemic heightened, and began to work preserving the legacies of his friends, including his partner at the time Andreas Senser. Sur archived estates of artists including Angel Borrero, Bern Boyle, Timothy Greathouse, Gayle Kirkpatrick, and Neil Polen in the 1990s, and Buster Cleveland, Brian Buczak, George Deem, Al Hansen, Lorraine O'Grady, and Stephen Varble in the early 2000s. Sur joined the board of the Visual AIDS Archive Project in the 1990s, where he met Geoffrey Hendricks and later cofounded the Frank Moore Archive Project in 1996 with Geoffrey Hendricks and Frank Moore to support artists with AIDS through their estate management. He has worked with Visual AIDS to curate exhibitions alongside Geoffrey Hendricks, such as Visual AIDS: Selections from the Archive, 2000, and Lightbox, 2000. Hendricks and Sur organized the historic exhibition Critical Mass: Happenings, Fluxus, Performance, Intermedia, and Rutgers University, 1958–1972. Along with Frank Moore they curated A Living Testament of the Blood Fairies, 1996–1997 at Artists Space.

Sur created the archives of the Green Oasis Community Garden in the East Village, which now live at the Museum of Reclaimed Urban Space.

Sur remains a custodian of the house where he lived with Geoffrey Hendricks on Greenwich St, alongside two archivists who compile the estate of the painter Brian Buczak, former partner of Hendricks and former resident of the Greenwich Street building. The house contains a Fluxus library compiled by Phillip Ward, the executor of Quentin Crisp's estate. The library includes books pertaining to artists such as Dick Higgins, Ray Johnson, Allan Kaprow, George Maciunas, Nam June Paik, and Carolee Schneeman.

In 2017, Sur won the “Candy Darling Activist Award” at the Acker Awards, a community led celebration of Lower East Side cultural history, which AMNY described as having the mission to “honor the pioneer rebels of the Downtown arts scene."

=== Performance and writing ===
Sur has contributed writing to numerous catalogues and anthologies including Art AIDS America Catalogue, 2015; The Road Before Us: One Hundred Black Gay Poets (1991); Words of Fire (1995). In 2007 Sur collaborated with Derek Jackson to produce HUNG zine, which he describes on his website as “a zine produced by and for neo queer afro punks and their admirers.”

About the theater and art world of New York's Lower East Side that Sur frequented, Sur writes in Artsy:

“They were certainly more familiar social settings than the West Side bars that too often didn’t welcome Black folks. Venues like Club 57, The Pyramid Club, PS 122, 8BC, La MaMa, and the Theater for a New City centered queerness. These were the places I ventured in my neighborhood. With the introduction of these spaces, queer performance art became even more evident. John Kelly, Karen Finley, Tim Miller, Klaus Nomi, Keith Haring, and David McDermott grew out of a different scene than John Vaccaro, Charles Ludlam’s Theater of the Ridiculous, the Hot Peaches, and the Bloolips—inhabitants of the theatrical world I was introduced to when I first arrived in New York.”

In 1995, Jack Waters directed Sur's poem "Percodan & Wisdom", turning it into a film. Also in 1995, Sur Rodney (Sur) and his late partner Geoffrey Hendricks hosted Wedding Event at Judson Memorial Church, taking after Ingrid Nyeboe and Jill Johnston's 1993 Fluxprocession.

== Selected bibliography ==
=== Performances ===
- Nipplemuse, Envoy Gallery, New York (2009)
- Free Advice, Montauk Highway, Southampton, NY (2007)
- Yellow, Museum Ludwig, Cologne (2005)
- Wedding Event, Judson Memorial Church, New York (1995)
- Croton on the Hudson, Croton-on-Hudson, NY (1994)
- Untitled (Taped Mouth), Gracie Mansion Gallery, New York (1983)
- Nifty Nipper Pits Party, A's Space, New York (1981)
- Sur Rodney Sur Show and the All New Sur Rodney Sur Show, Manhattan Cable and Mudd Club, New York (1980)
- AHWS, Animal Hospital of Washington Square, New York (1979)
- Sirloin Steak, Musée des Beaux-Arts de Montréal (1977)
- S’AMUSEE, Musée des Beaux-Arts de Montréal (1976)
- Candy Darlings, 112 Greene Street, New York (1976–79)
- Security, Musée des Beaux-Arts de Montréal, School of Art and Design (1975)
- Corridor, Musée des Beaux-Arts de Montréal, School of Art and Design (1974)
- Plexiglas, Musée des Beaux-Arts de Montréal, School of Art and Design (1974).

=== Selected writing ===
- Craft & Conceptual Art : reshaping the legacy of artists' books. 2023.
- Saint, Assoto, ed. (1991). The Road Before Us: One Hundred Black Gay Poets. New York: Galiens Press. ISBN 978-0-9621675-1-5.
- Prose and Poetry / Selected Poetry. New York. 2010.
- Patterson, Clayton, ed. (2012). Jews of the Lower East Side. Vol. 2. Clayton Books. ISBN 9780985788315.
- Art AIDS America. Tacoma Art Museum in association with University of Washington Press. 2015. ISBN 978-0-295-99494-9.
- Abrams, Nora Burnett; Basquiat, Jean-Michel, eds. (2017). Basquiat before Basquiat: East 12th Street, 1979-1980 (1st ed.). Denver, CO: Museum of Contemporary Art Denver. ISBN 978-1-61689-575-4.
- Leslie-Lohman Museum of Gay and Lesbian Art (2019). Casals, Gonzalo; Parness, Noam (eds.). Queer holdings: a survey of the Leslie-Lohman Museum collection. Munich: Hirmer. ISBN 978-3-7774-3193-2.
- Rodríguez Muñoz, Bárbara, ed. (2020). Health. Documents of contemporary art. London : Cambridge, Massachusetts: Whitechapel Gallery ; The MIT Press. ISBN 978-0-262-53946-3.
