= Glen Seator =

Visual artist

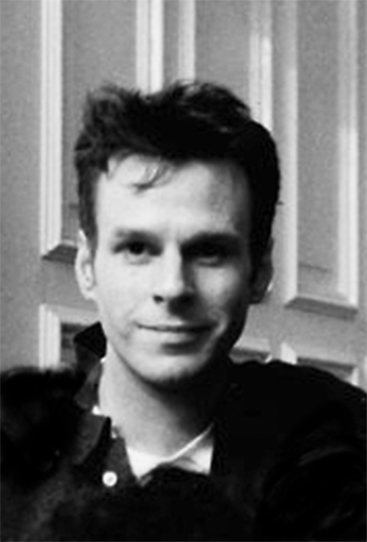
- Seator in 1993
- Born: June 5, 1956; Beardstown, Illinois
- Died: December 21, 2002 (aged 46); Brooklyn, New York
- Education: Massachusetts College of Art and SUNY Purchase
- Known for: installation art, sculpture, photography
- Awards: Louis Comfort Tiffany Foundation, Pollock-Krasner Foundation, the Soros Foundation, John Simon Guggenheim Memorial Foundation

Glen Seator (1956-2002) was an American visual artist and conceptual sculptor. He lived in Brooklyn, NY and San Miguel de Allende, Mexico.

== Early life ==
Born Glen Thomas Seator in 1956 in Beardstown, Illinois to mother, Lynette Hubbard Seator (d. 2012), a professor of Modern Languages, and father Gordon Douglas Seator (d. 1988), a judge. While growing up his family lived in the small community of Mount Sterling. Seator had three sisters, Patricia, Penelope and Pamela.

== Education ==
Seator attended high school in Jacksonville, Illinois, where he skipped a year. Upon graduation, he used earnings from minimum-wage employment to travel throughout the world for nine months. Upon returning to the U.S., Seator earned a BFA at the Massachusetts College of Art, Boston in 1984, and a MFA from SUNY Purchase in 1989. Prior to that he attended the Cooper Union, New York, from 1981 to 1982.

== Career and exhibitions ==
Seator was well known in the 1990s and early 2000s for his architecture-inspired installations and architectural interventions. Seator's work has been compared to other conceptual sculptors, Robert Gober and Charles Ray and has affinities to some of the work of Bruce Nauman. In his full-scale architectural reconstructions, the artist addressed the delicate balance of place, power and position. In an interview with the architectural historian, Anthony Vidler, Seator stated that a primary influence was the work of Gordon Matta Clark. The art historian Adam Weinberg has written that Seator's sculptural work had "a dramatic kinesthetic effect which may bring on vertigo."

Seator also produced sculptural procedure-based process artworks, such as the sweep-action piece, Untitled Auditorium Installation (1993) at MoMA PS1 in Queens, NY, as well as the transformation of a townhouse he owned in the historical neighborhood of Vinegar Hill, Brooklyn into a work of installation art. Seator also created large panoramic photo-installations dealing with the landscape and "emptiness" of the desert; the vernacular architecture of Echo Park, Los Angeles and the pristine architectural storefronts of Beverly Hills, California. Seator's first solo exhibition was in New York, followed by major installations in Warsaw, Vienna, San Francisco, London and Basel. In 2000-2001 his work was featured in a two-person exhibition, The Architectural Unconscious: James Casebere and Glen Seator, at the Addison Gallery of American Art at Phillips Academy in Andover, Massachusetts. The show traveled to the Institute of Contemporary Art, Philadelphia.

Seator's first one-person shows were held in New York City in 1991, at the SculptureCenter and Art in General. He went on to have solo exhibitions at the Kunstraum Wien, Vienna, Austria; Kunsthalle Basel; White Columns; and at several art galleries including Jay Joplin/White Cube, London; Burnett Miller Gallery, Los Angeles; and Gagosian Gallery, Los Angeles. His work was included in group exhibitions at Mary Boone Gallery, New York; Greene Naftali Gallery, New York; the Neuberger Museum of Art, Purchase, NY among others.

His most recent work at the time of his death were large-scale panoramic photographs of landscapes and urban street-scenes.

== Significant works ==
Glen Seator, Untitled (Auditorium Installation), 1993, sweeping compound, dirt, light. MoMA/PS1 Museum

Untitled (Auditorium Installation) (1993). Seator's large-scale process-oriented exhibition at PS1 Museum in Long Island City, New York, extrapolated on his studio-based project Interrupted Sweeping (1991-1995) by enacting a long-term procedural action in which he used sweeping compound to clean the floor of the auditorium gallery nightly. In time, the piles accumulated into larger and larger arrays of material. These piles of material held in a "perpetual state of interruption" were individually lit from the grid of ceiling lights that had been lowered on cords to hover just above the piles of dirt.

Preventative Measures, (1994). Installation at the National Gallery of Contemporary Art (Zaçheta), in Warsaw, Poland, Seator meticulously covered the ornate Neo-Renaissance-style salon walls with horizontal strips of masking tape, creating "an etherial yet overwhelming image of itself." The installation covered 8,000 square feet of wall space.

Glen Seator, B.D.O. (Biennial Director's Office (1997), collection Whitney Museum

N.Y.O. + B. (New York Office and Ballroom), (1996). Commissioned by the New York Kunsthalle, was a full-scale replication of an office and bathroom, tilted on its side. The 10,000 pound off-kilter structure was anchored to the floor with three steel cables. In his essay, Glen Seator's Daring Desiring Machines art critic Terry R. Myers describes the work as "dangerous minimalism," and compares Seator's work to that of Bruce Nauman and Michael Asher.

B.D.O. (Breuer Director's Office), (1997). Installation commissioned by the Whitney Museum of American Art for the 1997 Whitney Biennial, was a reconstruction of a full-scale office tilted at a 45-degree angle; an exact replication of the museum director's office. Art critic David Joselit wrote that the artwork enabled spectators to "carefully scrutinize" reality. Viewing the installation gave the audience a sense of disorientation and dizziness.

Approach, (1997). Commissioned by the Capp Street Project, San Francisco, and replicated a full-scale elevated version of the street outside the gallery. Seator recreated every micro-detail of the outside street, including sidewalk cracks with bits of grass, chipped red curb paint, and graffiti on a telephone pole. The installation was created from 150 tons of concrete, asphalt and other building materials. In addition to the street scene, Seator also replicated the front exterior western facade of the gallery inside the gallery.

Fifteen Sixty One, (1999). Commissioned by the Gagosian Gallery, Beverly Hills, CA, in 1999, was an exact replica of a check-cashing store located in a Latino neighborhood on Sunset Boulevard. The installation was one of three works created specifically for the gallery in a solo exhibition entitled, Three. The project highlighted the economic disparity between Beverly Hills and the Latino neighborhood.

Places for Balanced Sculptures, (2000). Commissioned by the Addison Gallery of American Art, Andover, Massachusetts and the Institute of Fine Arts|Institute of Fine Art, Philadelphia, was composed of three large-scale sculptural corner forms, each balanced on point. Seator replicated to scale a corner of the USAirways terminal at Boston Logan Airport; a corner of the Addison Gallery; and a corner of the Friendly's sandwich and ice cream shop in Andover. While this work references Gordon Matta Clark, it is distinct from it in that Seator reconstructs architectural fragments in an additive manner, whereas Clark cut off and represented fragments through a subtractive process of selective demolition.

This by the Light of That (2001-2002). A collaborative project with the Canadian designer Bruce Mau at Schindler House, designed by the architect Rudolph Schindler. The exhibition was sponsored by the MAK Center for Art and Architecture, incorporating neon signage, typography and language, and included a series of mass-media print forms including 25 outdoor art billboards. The project critiqued the advertising industry, and shed light on the role of corporate identity. In 2002, Hatje Cantz Publishers in conjunction with the MAK Center published the book, Glen Seator: Moving Still, documenting a decade of his work.

== Awards and honors ==
Seator was awarded grants and fellowships from the Louis Comfort Tiffany Foundation, the Pollock-Krasner Foundation, the Soros Foundation, and the John Simon Guggenheim Memorial Foundation in 2000.

The Getty Museum Institute named Seator a Scholar-in-Residence from 2000 to 2001. He received a fellowship from the Edward F. Albee Foundation in 1990. His work was the subject of a symposium, Moving Things, Moving Places: The Work of artist Glen Seator, at the Getty Research Institute of the Getty Museum in 2002. He received two fellowships from the MacDowell Colony in 1990 and 1994.

== Collections ==
Seator's work is included in the permanent collections of the Whitney Museum of American Art, the Solomon R. Guggenheim Museum, among other public and private collections.

== Death ==
In December 2002, Seator died in an accidental fall from his roof while repairing the chimney of his three-story townhouse located at 12 Duffield Street in Brooklyn, New York.

== Legacy ==
The 12 Duffield Glen Seator Foundation was established in 2004, and has been working with Steidl Verlag Publishers on a catalogue raisonné of his work, to be titled, Glen Seator: Making Things Moving Places.

== See also ==
- Installation art
- Site-specific art
