= Robin Kahn =

American artist and writer

- Born: 1961 (age 64–65); New York, New York
- Known for: Writer, artist
- Website: robinkahn.com

Robin Kahn (b. 1961 New York City) is an American writer and artist. In 1995 she conceived and edited Time Capsule: A Concise Encyclopedia by Women Artists. In 2006 she created The Intelligent Woman's Guide to Art, repurposing a 1950s publication. In 2010 her book Dining in Refugee Camps: The Art of Sahrawi Cooking was published. Following the book Kahn created a series of collaborative events commissioned by documenta (13). Entitled The Art of Sahrawi Cooking it involved the National Union of Sahrawi Women (La Cooperativa Unidad Nacional de Mujeres Saharaui).

Kahn's work is in the National Museum of Women in the Arts.
