= Pyramid Club =

Pyramid Club may refer to the following night clubs:

- Pyramid Club (New York City), a night club in East Village, Manhattan, popular among the gay and drag scenes
- Pyramid Club (Philadelphia), a former club for African American professional social gatherings, founded in 1937 and closed in 1963
