= Matthew McCaslin =

American artist

Matthew McCaslin (born 1957 in Bay Shore, New York) is an American artist living and working in Brooklyn, New York. His work deals with the intersection of nature and technology, combining everyday construction materials or consumer electronics in a way that may invoke chaos or disorder, or formalism and minimalism.

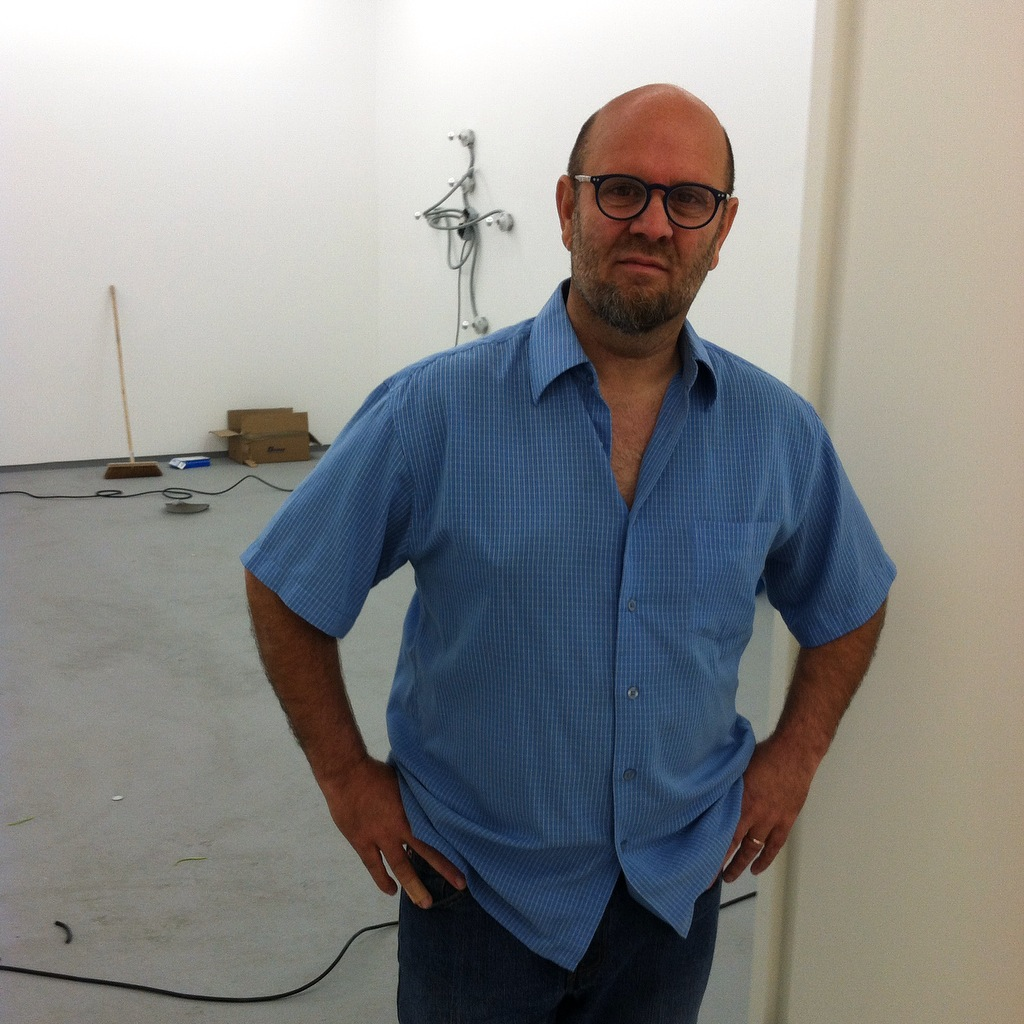
Matthew McCaslin installing an exhibition at New Art Projects, London, 2016

== Education and career ==
McCaslin received a Bachelor of Fine Arts from Parsons School of Design in New York in 1980. He is internationally known for his video and light sculptures. His distinct visual vocabulary, built from industrial materials, combines elegance and formality with roughness and spontaneity. McCaslin regularly includes televisions, clocks, light bulbs, fans, outlets, cables and plugs in his sculptures. Images, often of natural phenomena, presented on television monitors are seamlessly integrated. The use of these everyday objects reminds the viewer of his daily dependence on a technological support system. Inherent in McCaslin’s art is the question of functionality versus aesthetics. Referring to his work, McCaslin states “these seemingly disparate pieces are a playful reflection on the objects we live with and environments we live in. By mixing materials, gesture, and locations, I hope to evoke feelings in the viewer of the world around them that are deeply rooted but can’t be simply placed.”

== Collections ==
He has exhibited extensively in galleries and museums around the world, including New York, Los Angeles, Buenos Aires, and Paris, among other US and international cities. Most recently, the artist has had solo exhibitions in Paris, Cologne, Madrid and Nuremberg.

McCaslin's work can be found in the permanent collections of the Los Angeles Museum of Contemporary Art, the Walker Art Center, the Mary and Leigh Block Museum of Art, the Albright-Knox Art Gallery, the Jewish Museum, the University of Michigan Museum of Art, the Portland Art Museum, and the Museum Ludwig in Cologne, Germany, among many others.

== Personal ==
He currently lives in Brooklyn with his wife, artist Amy Williams.
