= Komodo Indonesian Fauna Museum and Reptile Park =

Museum in Indonesia

Komodo Indonesian Fauna Museum Museum Fauna Indonesia Komodo
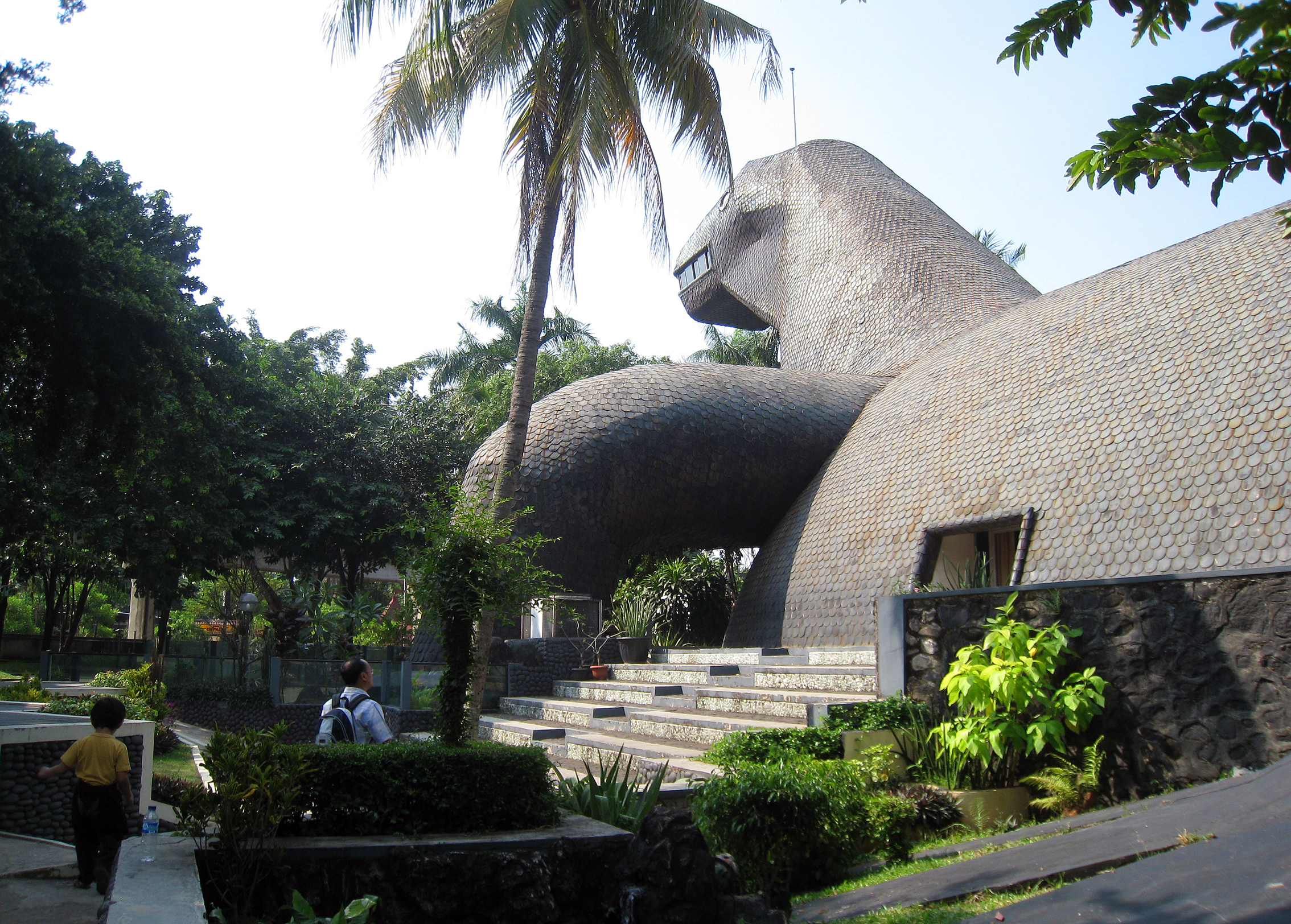
- The main building of Komodo Indonesian Fauna Museum
- Established: 20 April 1978
- Location: Taman Mini Indonesia Indah, Jakarta, Indonesia
- Coordinates: 6.30394731°S 106.901011°E
- Type: Zoological
- Website: Museum Fauna Indonesia Komodo & Taman Reptil

Komodo Indonesian Fauna Museum and Reptile Park (Indonesian: Museum Fauna Indonesia Komodo dan Taman Reptilia), is a zoological museum located within the Taman Mini Indonesia Indah (TMII) compound, in East Jakarta, Indonesia. The museum specialized on presenting various collection of the fauna of Indonesia, especially endemic animals of Indonesia, to provides information and education on Indonesian animal diversity. The Komodo Fauna Museum is located on southeast corner of Taman Mini Indonesia Indah cultural park.

The main building takes the shape of a giant Komodo dragon, the world's largest lizard endemic to Indonesian island of Komodo.

== History ==
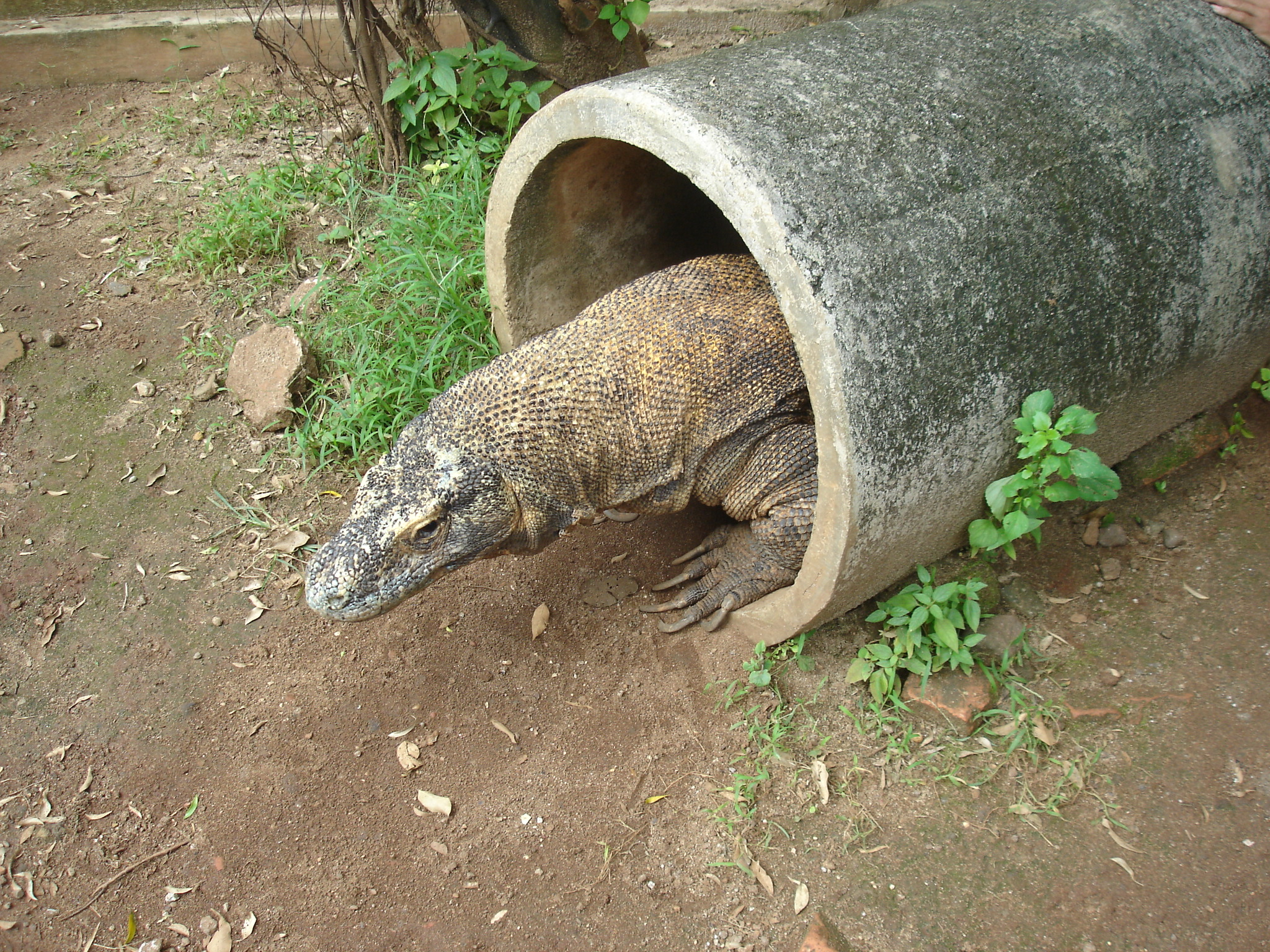
Komodo dragon in reptile park

The fauna museum was built as an integral part of Taman Mini Indonesia Indah, to showcase the fauna diversity that inhabit the Indonesian archipelago. The construction started on 1 October 1975 and finished on 1 July 1976, and officially inaugurated by President Suharto on 20 April 1978. Initially the museum displayed the collection of taxidermed animals endemic and native to Indonesia, such as the tiger, babirusa, Komodo dragon, and bird of paradise. The museum also displayed the diorama of several ecosystems of animal habitats of Indonesian archipelago, including rainforest, mangrove swamp, and savanna.

On 2000, the park surrounding the museum was transformed into a reptile park, with a collection of living reptiles and amphibians; including numbers of venomous snakes, phytons, crocodiles and Komodo dragon.

On 2015, the museum undergone major make-over and restoration. The renovation took place between August 2015 to February 2016. Initially the museum displayed a diverse collection of preserved animals, including butterflies, fish, birds, mammals and reptiles in their natural environment. The types of protected animals shown include Sumatran tigers, Komodo dragons, turtle, butterfly, and others. However, after the restoration, the collection is focused only on reptiles and amphibian, with main focus on the Komodo dragon as the museum's main attraction. The new Komodo museum was opened to public in April 2016.

== Collection ==
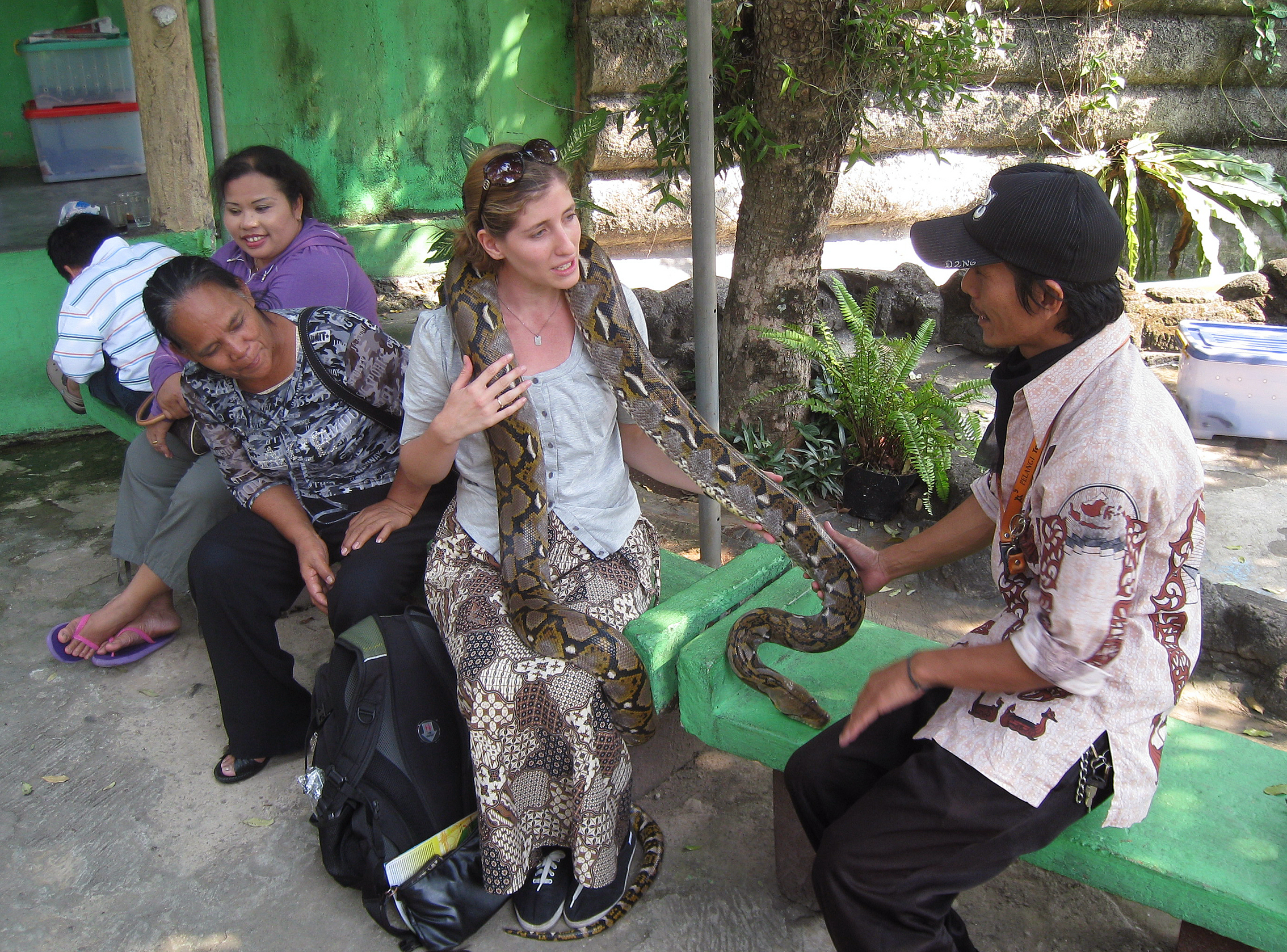
Visitors accompany the keeper are allowed to pet and take photograph with the reticulated python in reptile petting zoo, Taman Mini Indonesia Indah Reptile Park.

The museum displays taxidermed animals and skeletons, also diorama of several animal habitats of Indonesian archipelago. By 2016, the museum focused only on displaying the collection of taxidermed body and skeletons of reptiles and amphibians of Indonesian archipelago.

The park surrounding the museum main building is the site of a reptile park, a mini zoo with collection of more than 67 species of reptiles. There are numbers of terrariums containing reptiles, mainly snakes and lizards, and also several large enclosures containing large reptiles; such as saltwater crocodile, python, and Komodo dragon. There is also a petting zoo, where visitors could touch, pet and take photographs with reptiles, such as tortoise, iguana and non-venomous snakes.
