= Mike Bidlo =

American conceptual artist

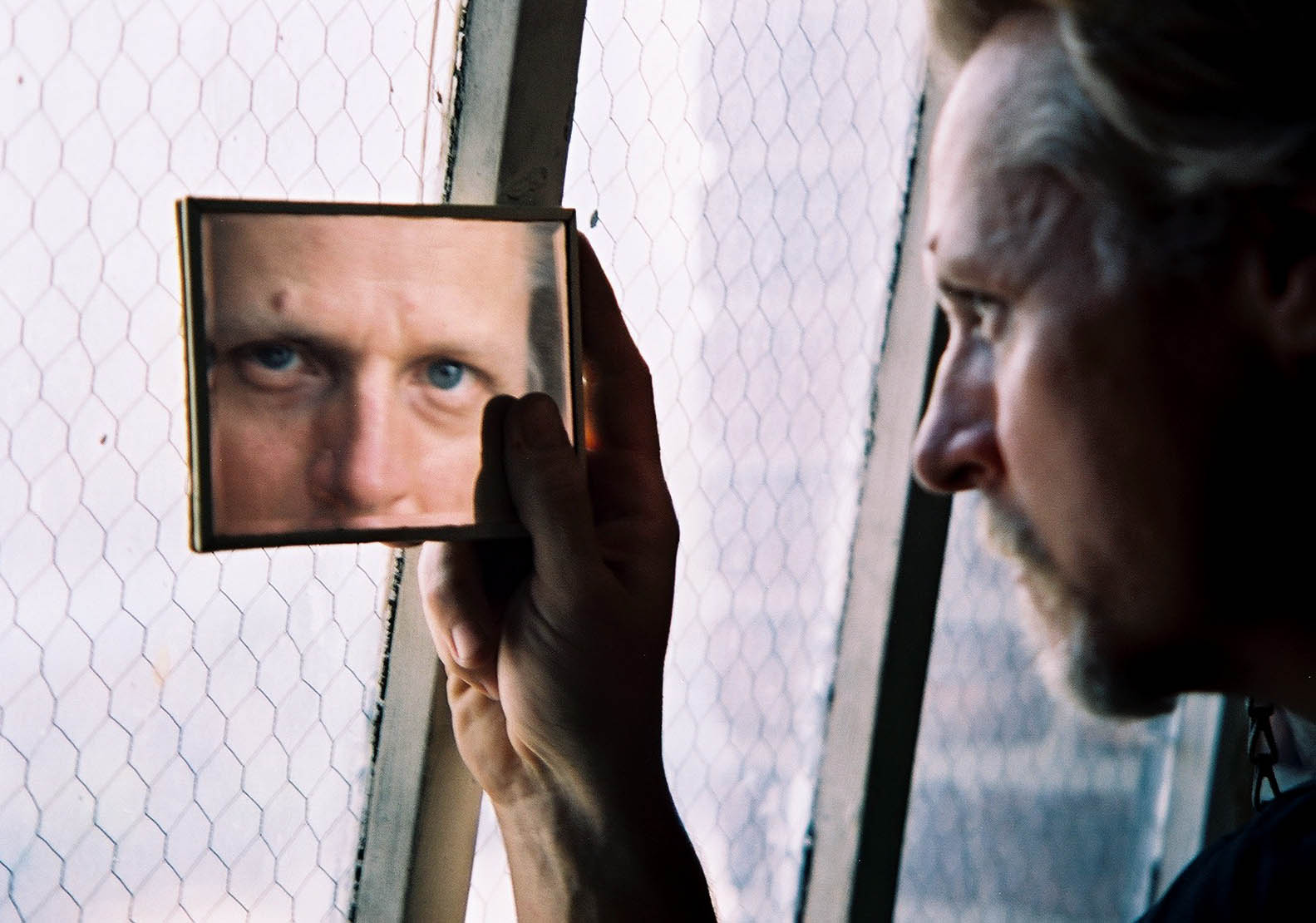
Bidlo in 2005

Michael Bidlo (born 20 October 1953) is an American conceptual artist who employs painting, sculpture, drawing, performance, and other forms of "social sculpture".

== Early life and education ==
Bidlo was born in Chicago, Illinois and studied at the University of Illinois (BA,1973), Southern Illinois University Carbondale (MFA,1975), and at Teachers College at Columbia University in New York, (MA,1978).

== Career ==
=== Early years ===
In 1980 shortly after moving to New York City from Chicago, Bidlo participated in Colab's Times Square Show and in 1982 Bidlo was awarded a studio at the PS1 Museum where he staged Jack the Dripper at Peg's Place, an installation rendering his vision of Peggy Guggenheim's Beekman Place townhouse, with the fireplace famously used by Pollock as a pissoir. Bidlo's event was an act of homage and defiance and for the next few years he immersed himself in discovering how to paint like Pollock, then executing his series to scale of "NOT Pollock" drip paintings.

The Pier 34 project was co-organized by Bidlo and David Wojnarowicz and lasted from 1983 to 1984 until it was closed by the police. The pier was located in the abandoned Ward Line shipping terminal located at the foot of Canal Street. Bidlo and Wojnarowicz issued a statement and an invitation spread through art channels including Lucy Lippard for artists to come and work in the pier building.

=== Masterpieces Series ===
In 1983 Bidlo painted his version of Pablo Picasso's "Les Demoiselles d'Avignon" in the PS1 studio. This painting was subsequently shown in "Picasso's Women: 1901–1971" at Leo Castelli Gallery, the "Masterpieces" exhibition at Bruno Bischofberger Gallery, and in 2015 at the Grand Palais in Paris. This painting was the beginning of Bidlo's reinventions and recreations of iconic works in the history of modernist masters.

Series from 1985 to 1998 include:

- "NOT Andy Warhol's Factory", a reinvention of "The Factory" for one afternoon in Bidlo's attic studio.
- "NOT Franz Kline and NOT Man Ray", which included a series after Franz Kline's seminal black and white abstractions, to scale, and a re-creation of Man Ray's masterpiece, "A l'Heure de l'observatoire: Les amoureux".
- "NOT Guernica and NOT Klein", in 1985, with a full-scale version of Picasso's "Guernica" in Los Angeles at the Larry Gagosian Gallery, and a re-creation of Yves Klein's, "Anthropométries de l'époque bleue" where he wore a tuxedo and white gloves as Klein had done, directing naked women to make prints with their bodies on large sheets of paper using ultramarine blue paint. There were four evenings where this was enacted: in New York City in 1985, in 1986 in Sweden, in 1988 in Tokyo, and in 1989 in Seattle.
- "NOT Brancusi", 1986, for which Bidlo produced 100 replicas of Constantin Brâncuși's marble, "Mademoiselle Pogany" in cast plaster.
- "NOT Morandi", 1984–1986, Bidlo completed a series (concentration and recreation) of still life paintings by Giorgio Morandi. "NOT Morandi" paintings were shown in dual exhibitions in Rome and New York.
- "Picasso's Women 1901–1971", Bidlo began a series of paintings that was called, "Picasso's Women 1901–1971" in 1987 in which he selected images of women from Picasso's oeuvre. In 1988 they were exhibited at Leo Castelli Gallery.
- "NOT de Chirico" Bidlo worked from 1989 to 1990 on a NOT Giorgio de Chirico series of oil paintings that were exhibited in Paris at the Daniel Templon Gallery.
- "NOT Fernand Léger" Between 1991 and 1992 Bidlo produced full size oil paintings in the NOT Fernand Léger series, for a show that opened at the Bruno Bischofberger Gallery and remained on view for a week
- "NOT Georgia O'Keeffe and Magritte" Between 1993 and 1995 Bidlo investigated the flower paintings of Georgia O'Keeffe in oils and in numerous works on paper. Between 1996 and 1998 he invented a series based on René Magritte's paintings and sculptures, but most were done in grisaille.
- "St. Duchamp" Between 1995 and 1997 Bidlo assembled his ready-mades, rented a vintage storefront and there produced the installation and exhibition, "St. Duchamp". In 1997, Bidlo re-created a ceramic sculpture based on the image of "Fountain" that was taken by Alfred Stieglitz in 1917.
- "Fountain Drawings" Between 1995 and 1998 The "Fountain Drawings" series was ongoing and large selections were exhibited at the Bruno Bischofberger and Tony Shafrazi Galleries in Zürich and New York City.
- "NOT Erased de Kooning" Bidlo undertook the series "Erased De Kooning Drawings" in 2003 and they were exhibited at the Francis Naumann gallery in 2005.
- "Venus of Willendorf" Between 2001 and 2005 Bidlo produced a series based on the Venus of Willendorf, both paintings and molded and cast sculptures and he also produced a series of "NOT Warhol Oxidation Paintings".
- "NOT Manzoni" In 2006, Bidlo produced an edition of NOT Manzoni, "Merda d'artista (Artist's Shit)", and continued to reinterpret the work of Piero Manzoni in 2008, creating an action at Suny New Paltz, "The Consumption of Art (1960)". In 2015 Bidlo reinvented the "sculpture viventi", "NOT Manzoni, Carta d'authenticitá (1964)" in which Bidlo signed people as 'living sculptures' and gave them a numbered and signed certificate.

In 2002 The Astrup Fearnley Museum of Modern Art in Oslo mounted an exhibition titled "MIKE BIDLO. NOT Picasso, NOT Pollock, NOT Warhol" which included NOT Duchamp, NOT Léger, NOT Magritte and NOT de Chirico, and a catalog was published with two essays. The one in English has an essay by David Levi Strauss.

== Recent exhibitions and work ==
In 2016 an exhibition "MIKE BIDLO: NOT Duchamp, Fountain and Bottle Rack" included a bronze edition of "Fractured Fountain" and "Bottleracks" that were gilded in gold. Three bottleracks that were inaccurate and canceled from the edition were exhibited flattened by a steamroller.

Since 2006 Bidlo has been engaged in creating a series of works on paper, meditations on modern masters including; Roy Lichtenstein, Piet Mondrian, Barnett Newman, Georgia O'Keeffe, and Vincent van Gogh.

== Installations and actions ==
- Jack the Dripper at Peg's Place
- "Warhol's Factory" P.S. One Museum
- Guernica
- "St. Duchamp"
- "Success Is a Job In New York" Grey Art Gallery, NY 1989.
- Yves Klien, Monochromes

== See also ==
- Appropriation art

== Selected bibliography ==
- Bidlo, M., Rosenblum, R., & Francis M. Naumann Fine Art. (2005). Mike Bidlo: Erased de Kooning drawings. New York: Francis M. Naumann Fine Art.
- Rosenblum, R. (January 1, 2003). Mike Bidlo: Talks to. Artforum International.
- '80s THEN – Mike Bidlo talks to Robert Rosenblum. (January 1, 2003). Artforum International, 41, 8, 192.
- Bidlo, M., Astrup Fearnley museet for moderne kunst., Bergen kunstmuseum., & Listasafn Íslands. (2002). Mike Bidlo: Not Picasso, not Pollock, not Warhol. Oslo: Astrup Fearnley museet for moderne kunst.
- Rosenblum, R. (January 1, 1999). Bidlo's Shrines: With a series of more than 3,000 "Fountain Drawings," Mike Bidlo pays tribute to Marcel Duchamp's most scandalous readymade. Art in America, 87, 2, 102–104.
- Rosenblum, R. (January 1, 1999). Mike Bidlo: 1989. On Modern American Art.
- Bidlo, M., Galerie Bischofberger., & Tony Shafrazi Gallery. (1998). The fountain drawings. Zurich, Switzerland: Edition Galerie Bruno Bischofberger.
- Bonney, A., & Bidlo, M. (October 1, 1993). Mike Bidlo. Bomb, 45, 22–27.
- Bidlo, M., & Galerie Bischofberger. (1992). Not Léger, Mike Bidlo: [exhibition], Galerie Bruno Bischofberger. Zurich, Switzerland: Edition Gallery Bruno Bischofberger.
- Kent, S., Bidlo, M., Ocampo, M., Serrano, A., & Saatchi Gallery. (1991). Mike Bidlo, Manuel Ocampo, Andres Serrano. London: Saatchi Collection.
- Bidlo, M., Cohen, C., Wolff Gallery., & Feigen Inc. (1990). Strategies for the last painting: Mike Bidlo ... [et al.], November 27 – December 21, 1990, Wolff Gallery; January 11 – February 16, 1991, Feigen Incorporated. Strategies for the next painting : Cora Cohen ... [et al.], January 8 – February 9, 1991, Wolff Gallery; February 23 – March 30, 1991, Feigen Incorporated. New York City: Wolff Gallery.
- Bidlo, M., Daniel Templon (Gallery), Galerie Bischofberger, & Exposition. (1990). Bidlo (not de Chirico): Galerie Daniel Templon, Galerie Bruno Bischofberger. Paris: Galerie Daniel Templon.
- Bidlo, M., Daniel Templon (Gallery), & Galerie Bischofberger. (1990). Bidlo: (not de Chirico). Paris: Galerie Daniel Templon.
- Bidlo, M., Rosenblum, R., & Galerie Bischofberger. (1989). Masterpieces. Zurich: Edition Bischofberger.
- Rosenblum, R., Jakobson, B., Pincus-Witten, R., & Leo Castelli (N.Y.). (1988). Mike Bidlo: Picasso's women 1901–71.
- Masheck, J., & Schjeldahl, P. (January 1, 1988). Bidlo's Pablo. Art in America, 172–175.
- Costa, R., & Bidlo, M. (1984). The Warhol papers. New York: publisher not identified.
- Bidlo, M., & Printed Matter, Inc. (1982). Nancy Reagan fashion show: Limited edition souvenir. New York, N.Y: M. Bidlo.
- Galerie Bischofberger. (n.d.). Mike Bidlo: "Not Leger". Zurich;Galerie Bischofberger 1992.
- Bidlo, M., & Whitney Museum of American Art. (n.d.). Mike Bidlo: Artist file.
