= Rhonda Zwillinger =

American artist

- Born: 1950; Brooklyn, New York, U.S.
- Died: 2019 (aged 68–69); Arizona, U.S.
- Movement: Kitsch

Rhonda Zwillinger (1950 – 2019) was an American artist who created paintings, photographs, sculptures, jewelry.

Zwillinger was born in 1950 in Brooklyn, New York. She spent the majority of her career in New York. She moved to Arizona in 1991 seeking relief from multiple chemical sensitivity. She died on September 19, 2019.

She was included in several group exhibitions at the Museum of Modern Art including the 1984 show The New Portrait. Her work is in thecollection of the Brooklyn Museum, the Delaware Art Museum, and the Design Museum Den Bosch.
