= Contact/II =

American magazine

- Editor: Josh G Gosciak and Maurice Kenny
- Frequency: semi-annually
- Publisher: Contact II Publications
- Founded: 1976
- Country: USA
- Based in: New York
- Language: English
- ISSN: 0197-6796

Contact/II, or simply Contact II, was an American literary magazine from New York. Established in 1976, the periodical was edited by Maurice Kenny and Josh Gosciak. Contact II published poetry, reviews, and interviews. Contact II also published books and chapbooks of contemporary poetry. The name Contact II was a tribute to Contact, a small press poetry magazine produced in the 1920s and 1930s by William Carlos Williams.

Contact II was part of a proliferation of small independent presses based in downtown New York City in the 1970s and known for high production values. Maintaining a post box at the historic Bowling Green post office in Manhattan's financial district, the editors worked from George's Diner and their apartments in the Lower East Side and Brooklyn. In addition to the magazine, Contact II also published poetry chapbooks and mini-anthologies inserted into the magazine, including one by Mei-mei Berssenbrugge. Contact II developed a focus on multicultural poetry at a time before the idea of multiculturalism was widespread, and also fostered what Gosciak has called "a rough-edged regionalism" among poets writing outside of established American literary strongholds.

It has been said that Kenny has immensely contributed to "the growth of multicultural literatures of North America in his work as an editor [...] and as a mentor to emerging writers of color." Alex Jacobs, a Native American poet, said that Kenny helped emerging poets receive funding from the New York State Council on the Arts. Kenny also often published new poets in Contact II and his own imprint, Strawberry Press, devoted to publishing Native American poets.

Contact II also supported the feminist movement of the late 1970s and 1980s. The magazine published a special edition on women's writing and only included works by and about women for that issue. It featured articles about Audre Lorde, Laura Riding, and Judy Grahn, as well as poems by Carol Berge, Ntozake Shange, Rachal Hadas, Sharon Olds, Joan Colby, Frances Chung, Carolyn Stoloff, Wanda Coleman, and many others.

== Authors published in Contact II magazine ==
Writers published in the pages of Contact II magazine included:

- Diane Burns
- Mei-mei Berssenbrugge
- Ishmael Reed
- Wendy Rose
- Elizabeth Woody
- Shawn Wong
- Victor Hernández Cruz
- Joe Johnson
- Steve Cannon
- Jorge Brandon
- Bimbo Rivas
- Pedro Pietri
- Sandra María Esteves
- Amiri Baraka
- Safiya Henderson-Holmes
- Allen DeLoach
- Elliott Murphy
- Rose Lesniak
- Bart Plantenga
- Richard Armijo
- Will Bennett
- Max Blagg

== Books published by Contact II ==
In addition to the magazine, Contact II published numerous books and chapbooks. A partial list includes:

- Toll Bridge by Wilma Elizabeth McDaniel (1980) ISBN 9780936556017
- The Haiku's of Teaching by William Packard (1980)
- Dan de Lion by Michael Castro (1981)
- Blue Moon for Ruby Tuesday by Elizabeth Marraffino (1981) ISBN 9780936556024
- Riding the One-Eyed Ford by Diane Burns (1981) ISBN 9780936556055
- * Reggae Or Not! by Amiri Baraka (1981) ISBN 9780936556048
- Hello, I'm Erica Jong by Kathy Acker (1982) ISBN 9780936556079
- Cutting Our Losses by Steve Kowit (1982) ISBN 9780936556031
- What Happened When the Hopi Hit New York by Wendy Rose (1982) ISBN 9780936556086
- Packrat Sieve by Mei-mei Berssenbrugge (1983)
- What Matisse Is After: Poems and Drawings by Diane C. Chang (1984) ISBN 9780936556123
- * Trying to Understand what it Means to be a Feminist: Essays on Women Writers by Rochelle Ratner (1985) ISBN 9780936556109
- Nuke Chronicles: Writing and Art on Nuclear Devastation edited by Josh G. Gosciak (1985) ISBN 9780936556000
- W.C. Fields in French Light by Rochelle Owens (1986) ISBN 9780936556147
- The Man with the White Liver by Angela Jackson (1987) ISBN 9780936556161
- This Wanting to Sing: Asian in South America: Poetry from Peru, Ecuador, Brazil edited by Jaime Jacinto (1988) ISBN 9780936556178
- These Waves of Dying Friends by Michael Lynch (1989) ISBN 9780936556192
- The Green Dream by Olga Cabral (1990) ISBN 9780936556215
- Mississippi River Poems: Selected & New Writing by Arthur Brown (1990) ISBN 9780936556208
- Hotel Madden Poems by Paul Pines (1991) ISBN 9780936556253
- Paysanne: New & Selected Poems, 1961-1988 by Rochelle Owens (1991)
- The Edwardian Poems and the Queen of Swords: A Day in the Life - Tales from the Lower East Side by Barbara A. Holland (1991) ISBN 9780936556246
- Seismic Events by Harold Norse (1993)
