= A Gathering of the Tribes (cultural organization) =

- Formation: 1991
- Founder: Steve Cannon (writer)
- Type: Arts organization
- Headquarters: 745 E. 6th St. Apt 1A; New York City, New York 10009
- Website: http://www.tribes.org/

A Gathering of the Tribes is a multi cultural interdisciplinary arts organization founded by Dr. Steve Cannon (1935-2019) at his home at 285 East third street in New York City's East Village.

== History ==
In 1990 Steve Cannon was visiting the Nuyorican Poet's Cafe with artist David Hammons when he was inspired to create "A Gathering of the Tribes" first as a literary magazine to document the vibrant culture that was happening on the Lower East Side. The first issue was published with less than 1000 copies in 1991 on a Xerox machine.

== Organization ==
The Organization has published a literary magazine originally supporting marginalized artists from the Lower East Side since 1991. The collective grew to host a gallery in 1993 with the encouragement of its future curator, Dora Espinoza. Then included was a performance space where numerous exhibitions and concerts took place with notable artists and musicians such as the Sun Ra Arkestra, Chavisa Woods, Diane Burns, Katherine Arnoldi, Diane Burns, John Farris, Susan Scutti, Bob Holman, Ishmael Reed, Billy Bang, and David Hammons.

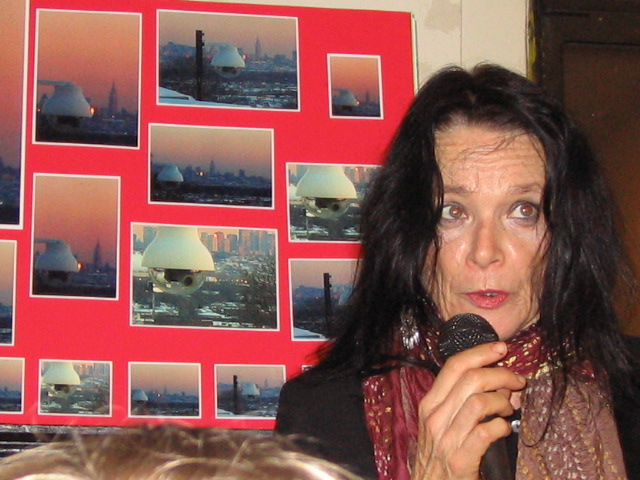
Anne Waldman reading at A Gathering of the Tribes, 2008.

The organization also ran a small publishing imprint called "Fly by Night Press", which has issued or reprinted books by among others; Carl Hancock Rux, Eve Packer, Brett Axel, Barbara Purcell. Lester Afflcik, Michael Carter, Amy Ouzoonian, John Farris, and John Rainard.

== Relocation and continued legacy ==
Gathering of the Tribes was first housed in Cannon's home at 285 East 3rd St. In 2006 Cannon was forced to sell the building and began renting his space within his former property . In April 2014 both the organization and Cannon were forced to relocate and the gallery permanently shut when the occupancy agreement they had with the woman to whom the building had previously been sold, Lorraine Zhang, ended. Simultaneously a wall which retained some of an art-piece by David Hammons (which had previously been sold to an art collector after having been reproduced and the originality of the object transferred) was removed and relocated by the organization and replaced by another minus the pedigree adornment.

A selection of artifacts from and videos of "A Gathering of the Tribes" are included in the 2022 Whitney Biennial at the Whitney Museum of American Art.
