= Steve Cannon (writer) =

American writer (1935–2019)

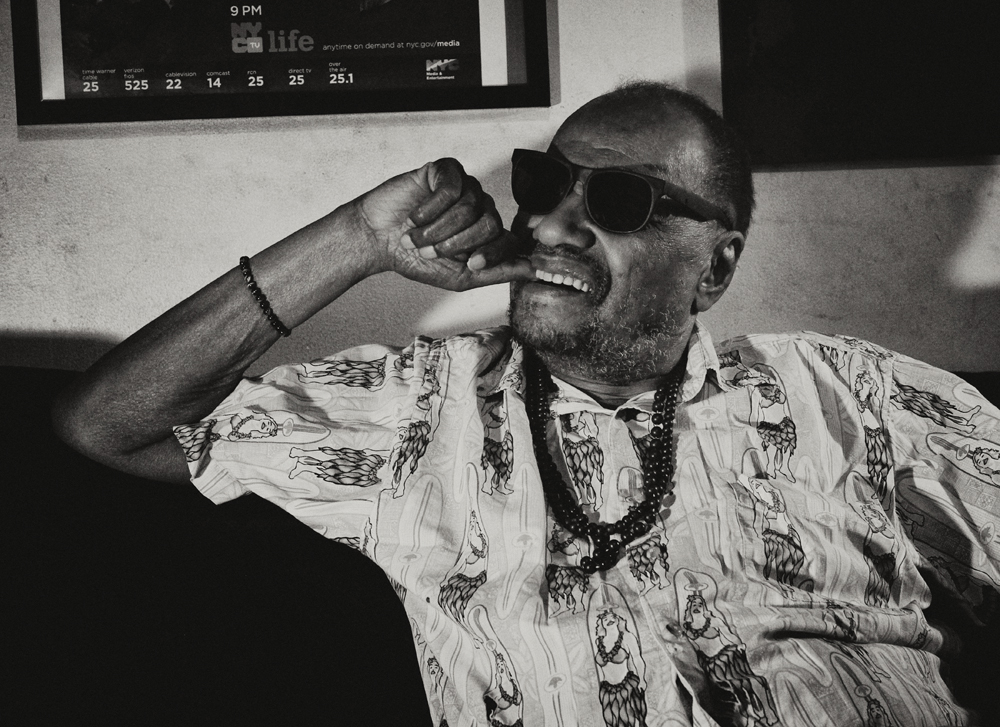
- Born: Calvin Stanley Cannon; April 10, 1935 New Orleans, Louisiana, U.S.
- Died: July 7, 2019 (aged 84) New York City, U.S.
- Occupation: Novelist
- Genre: Fiction, African-American literature

Steve Cannon (April 10, 1935 – July 7, 2019) was an American writer and the founder of the cultural organization A Gathering of the Tribes. He was born in New Orleans, Louisiana, and moved to New York City in 1962.

== Early life ==
Cannon was born in New Orleans, Louisiana and moved to New York City in 1962.

== Career ==
During the civil rights era, he was a member of the Society of Umbra, a collective of Black writers.

Cannon taught humanities at Medgar Evers College, helping to integrate the public school system in New York City.

In 1969, Cannon penned the novel Groove, Bang, and Jive Around, which author Ishmael Reed called the precursor to rap and author Darius James called in the New York Press, "an underground classic of such legendary stature that New York's black cognoscenti have transformed the work into an urban myth."

Cannon, along with Joe Johnson and Ishmael Reed, began an independent publishing house that focused on multicultural literature in the 1970s called Reed, Cannon and Johnson. In 1973 he also collaborated with Reed to interview the first Black sci-fi writer, George S. Schuyler, for Yardbird II, Reed's own publication.

Cannon met artist David Hammons on a park bench in the 1970s and they became friends. The two collaborated on certain works, including Invisible Paintings, where Hammons traced Cannon's painting collection with pencil and then removed the physical works. Hammons once bottled Cannon's voice speaking poems. Cannon wrote poems about Hammons' work and made public appearances for him.

Cannon was a mentor to many writers, including Eileen Myles, Norman Ohler, and Paul Beatty. In 2013 he was featured with curator Lydia Y. Nichols in an artist talk about Black bodies and migration for Curator's International.

=== A Gathering of Tribes ===
In 1990, Cannon was visiting the Nuyorican Poet's Cafe with Hammons when he was inspired to create A Gathering of the Tribes first as a literary magazine to document the vibrant culture that was happening on the Lower East Side. The first issue was published with less than 1000 copies in 1991 on a Xerox machine.

By 1993, Tribes quickly grew into a salon and non-profit multi-cultural interdisciplinary arts organization run from his home in the New York City borough of Manhattan's East Village neighborhood. Cannon wanted it to be a multicultural, multigenerational space for both local and traveling art lovers. The collective also hosted a gallery and performance space where numerous exhibitions and concerts have taken place, supporting and inspiring many notable artists and musicians such as the Sun Ra Arkestra (1995), David Henderson, Chavisa Woods, John Farris, Bob Holman, Ishmael Reed, Billy Bang, Diane Burns, Max Blagg, and David Hammons.

One of Cannon's exhibitions at Tribes Gallery that he titled Exquisite Poop was inspired by his relationship with visual art as a blind person. A painter included in the exhibition would describe a piece to participating writers, who would then describe the painting for a different painter who would in turn paint it.

In April 2014, both the organization and Cannon were forced to relocate and the gallery permanently shut when the occupancy agreement they had with the woman to whom the building had previously been sold, Lorraine Zhang, ended. Simultaneously, a wall that retained some of an art-piece by David Hammons (which had previously been sold to an art collector after having been reproduced and the originality of the object transferred) was removed and relocated by the organization, being replaced by another minus the pedigree adornment.

Tribes magazine began publishing online and Cannon published an anthology in hard copy in 2017.

== Personal life ==
Cannon went completely blind in 1989 from glaucoma.

== Death and memorials ==
Cannon died on July 7, 2019, from sepsis at an assisted nursing facility in New York City at the age of 84.

Cannon was memorialized at three events following his death. First there was a tribute reading organized by Bob Holman and Chavisa Woods at the Bowery Poetry Club the week after his death, at which many of his contemporaries, colleagues, and admirers offered remembrances. Among those who spoke and or performed were: Katherine Arnoldi, Janine Cirincione, Patricia Spears Jones, Valery Oisteanu, Penny Arcade, Ron Kolm, Nina Kuo, William Parker, and Daniel Carter, Cannon's sister Evelyn Cannon, his daughter Melanie Best, Nancy Mercado, Steve Dalachinsky, Mike Tyler, and Urayoán Noel, as well as Holman and Woods. For the second gathering held on September 6, 2019, at the Flamboyan Theater at the Clemente Arts for Art, A Gathering of the Tribes came together to offer a memorial program featuring poetry in music, including sendoffs from the Sun Ra Arkestra, Tracie Morris with Elliott Sharp and Graham Haynes, Anne Waldman, and Edwin Torres. Thirdly, a "Celebration of Life" was held by the Poetry Project at St. Mark's Church in-the-Bowery on Sunday, November 3, 2019, which was preceded by a Jazz Funeral parade led by the Rebirth Jazz Band flown in from Cannon's hometown of New Orleans beginning at his longtime home at 285 East 3rd street to the place of celebration. Among those offering praise both in words and in music for Cannon at this event were Matthew Shipp, Paul Beatty, and Victor Hernandez Cruz.

== Bibliography ==
- Cannon, Steve (1969). Groove, bang, and jive around. London: Genesis. ISBN 1885478534. OCLC 50876304.
- Cannon, Steve, ed. (1974). Jambalaya:Four Poets. New York: Reed, Cannon & Johnson. ASIN B0047XO228. OCLC 79642034.
- Cannon, Steve (1983). Jus' jass : correlations of painting and Afro-American classical music. New York, NY: Kenkeleba Gallery. OCLC 26798342.
- Cannon, Steve; Jones, Kellie; Finkelpearl, Tom (1991). David Hammons rousing the rubble. Boston, MA: MIT Press. ISBN 0262031841.
- Cannon, Steve; Bowling, Frank; McEvilley, Thomas (1991). The search for freedom : African-American abstract paintings, 1945-1975. New York, NY: Kenkeleba Gallery. OCLC 698576786.
