= Sensitive Skin (magazine) =

Sensitive Skin was a magazine created and edited by B. Kold and Norman Douglas. Started in 1991, the first four issues were titled Peau Sensible, which is French for "Sensitive Skin". Subsequent issues were titled in English. In 1994, John Farris, Patricia Winter, and Darius James joined the editorial team. That same year, Mr. E. Oso took over editorial duties for the final issue. The magazine is based in Mill Valley, California.

Sensitive Skin magazine included short fiction, screenwriting, poetry, reviews, drawings, essays, and photographs by both established and emerging writers and artists, mainly from New York. The publication also partnered with The Living Theatre to host release parties and benefits. Sensitive Skin published downtown New York writers including John Giorno, Herbert Huncke, Jack Micheline, Joel Rose, Lynn Tillman, Eileen Myles, David Rattray, Chris Kraus, David Ulin, Sparrow, Mike Topp, Ron Kolm, Richard Hell, Bob Holman, Wanda Phipps, Maggie Estep and Taylor Mead, among many others.

== Online version ==
After a sixteen year hiatus, Sensitive Skin was relaunched as an online magazine on June 18, 2010, by Bernard Meisler (publisher and managing editor) and Tim Beckett (webmaster and editor). The first issue contained work by Justine Frischmann, Andrew Huebner, Jose Padua, Tim Beckett, Steve Horowitz, Bob Bannister and Bart Plantenga. Steve Horowitz joined as music editor for issue two, and Rob Hardin joined as an associate editor for issue three. In subsequent issues, Sensitive Skin has published writing by Samuel Delany, Craig Clevenger, Marc Olmsted, Emily XYZ, Darius James, Gary Indiana, Sharon Mesmer, Nick Zedd, Stewart Home, Jonathan Shaw, Melissa Febos, Erika Schickel, Max Blagg, John S. Hall, Ron Kolm, Rob Roberge, Marty Thau, Marguerite Van Cook, James Greer, and Lyn Lifshin, art by Al Kresch, Charles Gatewood, Chris Molnar, James Romberger, Ted Barron, Shalom Neuman, John Lurie, Ruby Ray and Hal Hirshorn, video by Kevin Rafferty and music by Ralph Carney, Elliott Sharp, Ryan Choi, Steve Adams, Kurt Wolf, Timber and Dan Becker, and interviews with William S. Burroughs (by Allen Ginsberg) and Fred Frith.

In December 2011, Sensitive Skin Books was launched. Titles released so far include East of Bowery, with a text by Drew Hubner and photographs by Ted Barron, Barefoot in the Heart, an oral history of Neem Karoli Baba edited by Keshav Das, Backwards the Drowned Go Dreaming by Carl Watson, and Music: Drawing Down the Muse by David West.

Bernard Meisler won an Acker Award for publishing Sensitive Skin in 2014.
