= John Farris (poet and novelist) =

American poet and novelist

John Farris (1940–2016) was an American poet and novelist who lived in the East Village neighborhood in the New York City borough of Manhattan. He is the author of a volume of verse It's not About Time (1993). He is the also author of the novel The Ass's Tale, which won the 2013 Acker Award in fiction.

Farris was a member of the rag tag literary collective "The Unbearables". Early in his career, he spent some time in the orbit around the civil rights leader Malcolm X.

He died of a heart attack in January 2016 at his flat at the Bullet Space collective in the East Village.

== Legacy ==
A memorial celebrating Farris's life and art was held at the Judson Memorial Church in New York City on the evening of April 29, 2016. The speakers and readers at the memorial included; Chavisa Woods, Michael Carter, Ron Kolm, Bob Holman, Andrew Castrucci, Mia Hansford, David Henderson, Steve Cannon, and two of the writer's daughters; Farris's grandson jazz saxophonist Richard Dye also performed.

A volume of his final poems from Archway Editions was edited by Andrew Castrucci, Nicodemus Nicoludis and Chris Molnar. Excerpts from this project have appeared in Sensitive Skin and the Unpublishable anthology.

== Publications ==
- It's not About Time. Fly by Night Press, 1993. ISBN 9780963740502.
- The Ass's Tale. Unbearable Books, 2010. ISBN 9781570272219.
- Last Poems. Archway Editions, 2025. ISBN 9781648230509.
