= Roni Ben Ari =

Israeli photographer and curator

- רוני בן ארי
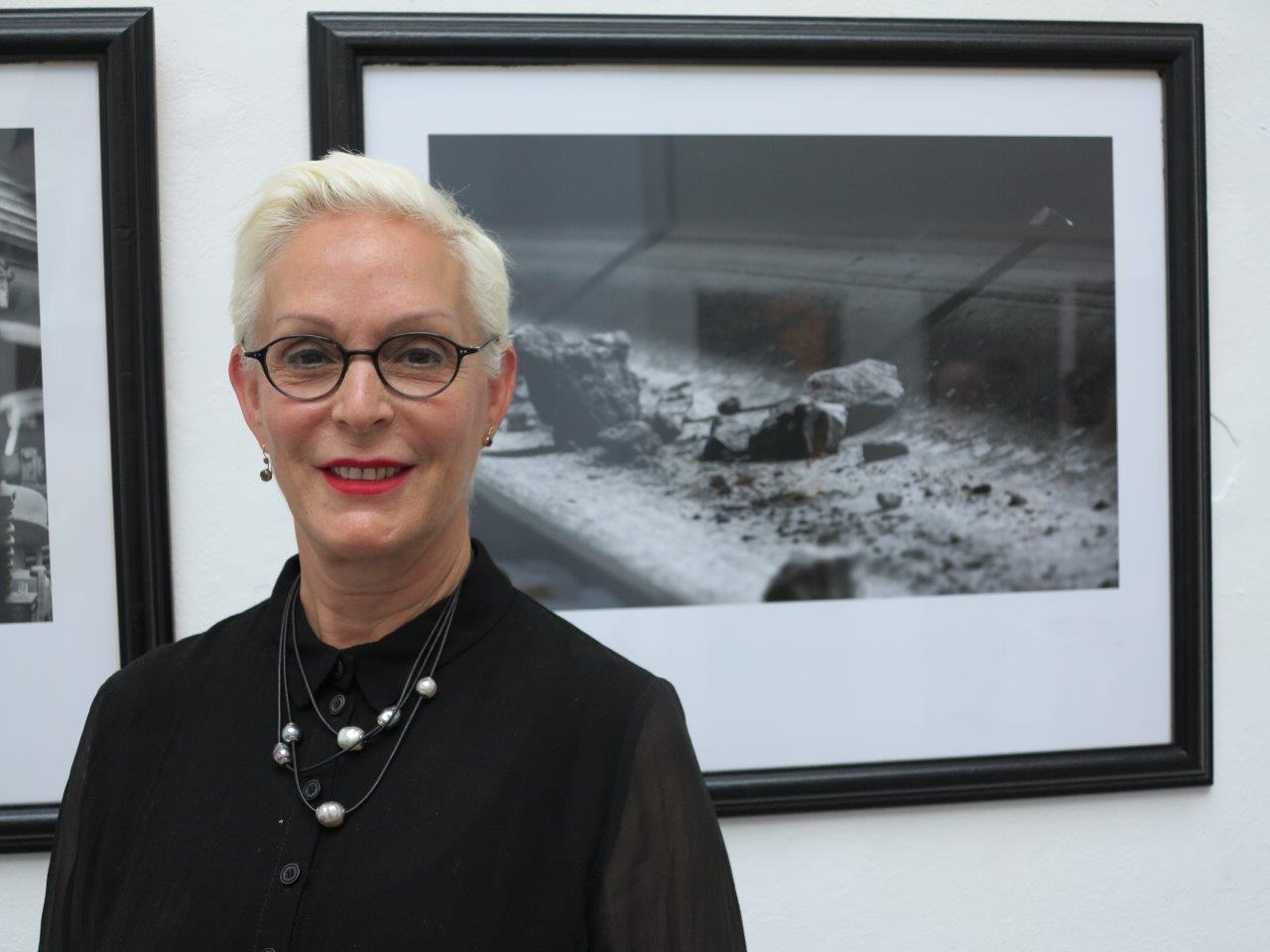
- Born: 1947 (age 78–79); Ramat Gan, Israel
- Education: Beit Berl Academic College
- Occupation: Photographer

Roni Ben Ari (Hebrew: רוני בן ארי; born Halpern; 1947) is an Israeli photographer, curator and multi-disciplinary artist.

Roni Ben-Ari was born in 1947 in Ramat Gan to Miriam and Abraham Halpern, a textile industrialist (Halpern Textile Industries). She lives in Moshav Netaim, with her husband, Daniel Ben Ari. They have three daughters. Ben Ari is a graduate of the Beit Berl Academic College, the School of Journalism in Tel Aviv, and the College for Geographic Photography.

== Early career ==
She worked as a news director and reporter at the Israel Broadcasting Authority, Educational Television, and Channel Two. In recent years, she has been working as an independent photographer. Her work has been exhibited in solo and in group exhibitions in Israel and around the world, and it can be found in museums as well as in private collections. Among the subjects Ben Ari has investigated is the Israeli heroine. Mira Ben Ari—an exemplary figure who became the symbol of the Women's Corp of the Israel Defense Forces and for women in general—who was killed in the battle of Kibbutz Nitzanim during the 1948 Arab–Israeli War. The educational and heritage center at the women of Valor Memorial - (located in old Nitzanim), was established in tribute to her spirit and legacy. Ben Ari is a founder and partner in the Bateva School educational program, a growing mainstreaming program that prepares children and youth with complicated learning disabilities for independent integration into society. She is also a shareholder in the Elyakim Ben Ari Company, a civil engineering company that executes national projects in Israel.

== Artistic career ==
Ben Ari uses her photography to document social issues such as aging, homelessness, prostitution, minorities, and ecology. She mainly photographs people, but also their surrounding environment. Before she photographs them, Ben Ari first becomes close to her subjects by living with them. For example, the photographs for her project, Journey in Search of "Țigancă", were taken only after she had been living among the Romani for about a year. She began the project after the death of her mother, who was born in Cluj-Napoka, Romania, a city that has historically had a large gypsy minority. In the project Till Their Voices Stop, Ben Ari lived in a nursing home. There, she photographed the fragile, elderly residents and recorded their voices, which she developed into a video installation that was exhibited in the gallery of the College for Geographic Photography.

Photography is often associated with the term "to take" as in "to take a picture." Roni's photography does not take. In Roni's photography, the act of giving is so present that she hears the voices, is aware of the needs, touches the textures, and thus brings the viewer closer. We all benefit from this closeness. This closeness is not perceived as an invasion of someone else's territory, but rather as the act of acceptance, of giving.

— Miki Kratsman

== Awards ==
- honorable mention, Bifa - Budapest international Foto award, 2026
- Finalist portrait slideshow, the 10th Head-On international photo festival, 2019
- Black & White magazine, single Image Contest, 2018
- Magnum Photography Awards 2017 – top 7% of all entries, impressive accomplishment
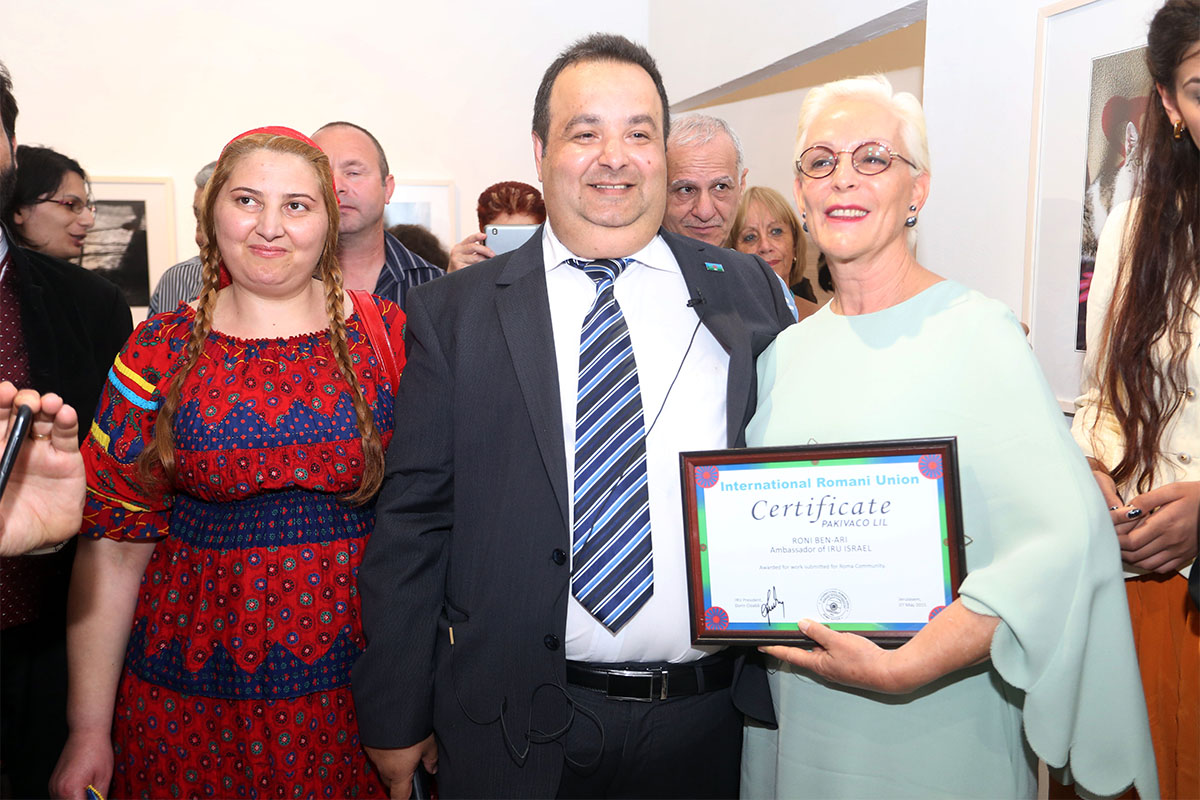
  Ben Ari receiving from the King of the Roma, Cioaba Dorin, an honorary title "ambassador in Israel for the Romani Community"
  2017– Hariban Award 2017, Kyoto, Japan
- The 5th Edition of the Jacob Riis for documentary Award, 2017
- UNESCO Prize for Art and Society, honorable mention, 2017
- Worldwide Photograph Gala Awards, first prize, Portrait Photography Category, 2013
- China Digital Photography Museum of Lishui, prize for Processed Photograph, 2011
- Julia Margaret Cameron Prize, Portrait Photography Category, 2011
- UNESCO Humanity Photo Award, 2008
- Ziv Prize for Television Journalism, 1988
- Ben Ari is the honorary ambassador in Israel for the Romani Community, a title she received personally from the King of the Roma, Dorin Cioabă, following an exhibition of her photographs depicting gypsy daily life

== Books ==
- Father -Loom- Requiem (2012) ISBN 978-965-92637-4-5
- From the inner margins (2013) ISBN 978-965-92637-5-2
- Ladies in waiting (2017) ISBN 978-965-92637-0-7
- Ethiopia here (2017) ISBN 978-965-92637-1-4
- Faces (2017) ISBN 978-965-92637-2-1
- Ocean of garbage (2017) ISBN 978-965-92637-3-8

== Exhibitions ==
=== 1998 ===
Lag Be-Omer Ceremony, Mount Meiron, Eretz Israel Museum, Tel Aviv

=== 2001 ===
City Project, Kibbutz Gallery, Tel Aviv

=== 2002 ===
Love Conquers, Kibbutz Gallery, Tel Aviv

=== 2006 ===
Solo exhibition, Until Their Voices Stopped, Gallery of the College for Geographic Photography, Tel Aviv

=== 2008 ===
Permanent solo exhibition, Ethiopia Here, The Story of the Ethiopian Community, photos embedded on 12 concrete pillars, Park of the Communities, Petah Tikva

Light, FusionArts Museum, New York, NY

Border between Two Cities, Museum of Jaffa

=== 2009 ===
Artists Create and book launch for Israeli Artists Book, Sand Horses Gallery, Paris

Culture of the Kiosk/Gift of Memory, 53rd Biennale (Marx 7), Scalamata Gallery, Venice, Italy

Memoir L'avenir, Head Museum, Paris, France

Inside Israel, traveling exhibition in China commemorating the 60th Anniversary of the State of Israel, Museum of the Three Kings, Chunching, China

City of Refuge, Tel Aviv Biennale of Art, Hangar 2, Jaffa Port, Tel Aviv

=== 2010 ===
Photography about Painting, Galerie Mémoire de L’avenir, Paris, France

Two-person exhibition, Ma'agalot , Office in Tel Aviv (Alternative space for interdisciplinary art), Tel Aviv

=== 201 ===
Echo Phobia Art, Drap-Art Festival, Nakba Museum/CCCB Barcelona, Spain

Wabi Sabi, "Love Art Make Art", Studio and Gallery, Tel Aviv

Mapping, 54th Biennale, Gallery Living Art Gallery, Venice, Italy

Black, Fusion Arts Museum, New York, NY

=== 2012 ===
Solo exhibition, Loom-Father-Requiem, Galerie Vernon, Prague, Czech Republic

Dance Signs, Tina B. Fest, Prague, Czech Republic

Solo exhibition, Sea of Garbage, video work, screened on Mani House, Tel Aviv

I Was There, Water Tower Art Fest, Sofia, Bulgaria

Transformation, Hallway Gallery, Documenta 2012, Kassel, Germany

=== 2013 ===
Solo exhibition, Montzi, Gypsies in Cluj-Napoca, Art Museum of Cluj-Napoca, Romania

"At your place", Roof Gallery, Duisburg, Germany

Rainbow in a Sea of Garbage, Gask Museum of Contemporary Art, Kutná Hora, Czech Republic

My Eye/I, 92nd Street Y, New York, NY

=== 2014 ===
Solo exhibition, Home Is Where the Hurt Is, Galerie Mémoire de L’avenir, Paris, France

in between the lines, Art Gallery, Botanischer Garten, München-Nymphenburg, Germany

Woven Consciousness, Contemporary Textile in Israel, Eretz Israel Museum, Tel Aviv

=== 2015 ===
Adama, Second Biennale for Sculpture and Photography, Moshe Kastel Museum, Jerusalem

Solo exhibition, Journey in Search of "Țigancă, Museum of Israeli Art, Ramat Gan

Adama, Gallery of the Ahmedabad and Baroda University and National Gallery of Mumbai, India

I Live in the East and My Heart Is in the West, Fifty Years of Israel-German Relations, Pasinger Fabrik, Munich, Germany

=== 2016 ===
Solo exhibition, Drawing in Stone, Artists House, Munich, Germany

Solo exhibition, Central Museum of Textiles, The 15th International Triennial of Tapestry, Lodz, Poland

Solo exhibition, Micro Macro, Pardes Festival, Kazmierz Dolny, Poland

Tower of Babel, Schema Projects, Brooklyn, NY

=== 2017 ===
Signing event Foley Gallery, NY

Solo exhibition, Gallery Ryugaheon, Seoul, Korea

UNESCO –Art & Society, Solo exhibition at the World Humanities Conference. Bruges, Belgium

Bosom Bodies, SIA Gallery, NYC

16th DongGang International Photo Festival, Korea

=== 2018 ===
Solo exhibition, The International Photography Festival of Photo Is:Rael

PhotoBook Show, Benaki Museum, Athens, Greece

Memory of the Future gallery, "can I call you madam?", Paris, France

Cuckoo's Nest gallery, "Beyond the mind", Jaffa, Israel
