= Ron Kolm =

American poet

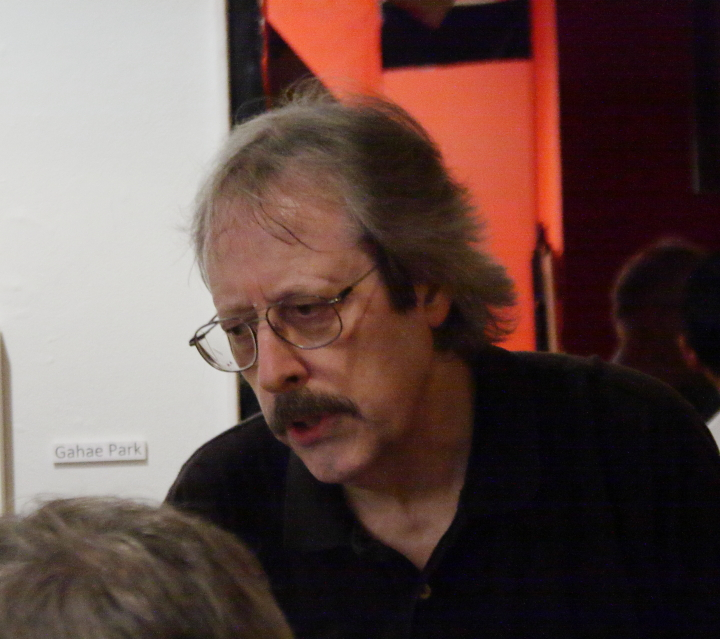
Ron Kolm, poet, novelist, editor

Ron Kolm (born 1947) is an American poet, writer, editor, archivist, and bookseller based in New York City. Known as "one of the mainstays of the downtown (literary) scene," Kolm is also a founder of the Unbearables, a "ragtag bunch of downtown poet-troublemakers."

== Biography ==
Kolm moved to New York in 1970 and got a job at the Strand bookstore, where he worked with Tom Verlaine and Patti Smith. Kolm's career in NYC independent bookstores spans some forty years and includes working at Eastside Bookstore, the original Coliseum Books on 57th Street, Shakespeare & Co. on Broadway at Astor Place, St. Mark's Bookshop, and Posman Books in Grand Central Terminal.

Kolm now works at the Posman Bookstore in Chelsea Market on the west side of Manhattan and lives in Long Island City.

== Writing and editing ==
Kolm is one of the "insurgent" writers and editors who emerged during the "blatant transformation and decay" of New York City in the 1970s and '80s. Kolm's writings frequently focus on anti-institution and anti-establishment themes along with issues such as residential squalor, recent control, the real estate boom, and everyday life on the Lower East Side of Manhattan before gentrification. The works of Kolm and other writers from this time have been called "radical postmodernism."

Kolm's writings have been printed in hundreds of small magazines along with books and anthologies such as the Penguin Books anthology Between C & D: New Writing from the Lower East Side Fiction Magazine, The Outlaw Bible of American Poetry, and Up Is Up, But So Is Down; New York's Downtown Literary Scene, 1974-1992 from New York University Press. His other publications include collections of his short fiction and poetry. He also collaborated on a novel, Neo Phobe, written with Jim Feast.

In addition to his writing, Kolm edited several downtown magazines during the 1970s and '80s. In 1980 Kolm established his own small press; Low-Tech Press. Before calling it quits a decade later, he had assembled a backlist of ten books (The Low-Tech Manual, Five Plus Five, Girlie Pictures and several Mike Topp titles). As he said to Levi Asher of Literary Kicks: "I published Art Spiegelman, Tuli Kupferberg and Hal Sirowitz, among others." In 2012 Ron Kolm became a contributing editor of Sensitive Skin Magazine, and the editor of The Evergreen Review. His tenure at the Evergreen Review came to an end in 2015.

From 2012 through 2019, Ron Kolm participated in Michael Rothenberg's and Terri Carrion's international event, One Hundred Thousand Poets for Change (100 TPC). In 2013 he became a member of Brevitas: a community of invited poets who email 1 to 2 original poems (14 lines maximum) to the group on the 1st and 15th of each month. Kolm has also been the featured weekly poet in the Poetry Super Highway three times.

In June 2014, Ron Kolm became a member of PEN America. That year he also read at the Sprachsalz in Hall, Austria. He previously read and performed his work in Prague, in 2012, and in Florence, in 2013.

On June 6, 2013, Kolm was presented with an ‘Acker Award’ at a ceremony in the Angel Orensanz Foundation by Clayton Patterson, for his editorial work. Ron Kolm and Jim Feast, who was also given an award, got them largely for their work at the Evergreen Review.

Historian Robert Siegle describes Kolm as "an editor and facilitator for magazines and presses as well as a writer of fiction and poetry" who "carried boxes of little magazines around to bookstores, passed around copies of new work, and connected people" in general, noting that "wherever we look along with the networks that hold together the diverse creative talents who constitute this cultural revolution, we find Kolm."

In 2024, "Pink Trees Press" published a memoir by Kolm aptly titled "The Bookstore Book", filled with recollections of his long tenures working in and managing various Manhattan book stores in New York City and the many notable personalities he met during that period.

== The Ron Kolm Collection ==
The Ron Kolm papers represent over 3,500 works of the downtown arts scene since the 1970s and contain works by "several hundred artists, plus 300 periodicals, film, fine art, and six boxes" of David Wojnarowicz's journals. The collection was purchased in 1996 by the Fales Library at New York University, where it is now stored.

Since placing this collection in the NYU Library, Kolm has continued to build archives of downtown materials, with an emphasis on Unbearables publications (the novels they've published, runs of magazines and other ephemera). There are now archives at The University of Rochester library, the Avant Writing Collections at Ohio State University (John M. Bennett, Librarian/Curator), The Poetry Collection at SUNY Buffalo (Michael Basinski, Curator), the Harry Ransom Center at the University of Texas at Austin, the main branch of the New York Public Library, the Museum of Modern Art Library and the library at Poets House in New York City.

== The Unbearables ==
In 1985 Kolm, Bart Plantenga, Mike Golden, and Peter Lamborn Wilson founded the Unbearables, "a loose confederation of poets and writers who came of age in 1980s and 90s New York. Infamous for their high-minded aesthetics and low, barroom manners, the group has sought to torment literary powers-that-be throughout its more than two decades of existence." The group was based on Wilson's precepts (written under the nom de guerre Hakim Bey), as set forth in his seminal book, TAZ (Temporary Autonomous Zone). David Life, the owner of the Life Cafe, gave them berets and renamed them "The Unbearable Beatniks of Life." Shortly after this, they did an event they called 'The Crimes of the Beats,' during which they dropped the word 'Beatnik' from their name, becoming simply 'The Unbearables.'

The group is best known for organizing a 1995 boycott of The New Yorker to protest "its flaccid, middle-of-the-road poetry" and for taking on the Beat generation (in an attempt, in Kolm's words, to "deconstruct the Beats myth in order to make it useful again.") During a 1995 conference about Jack Kerouac at New York University, Kolm "put on a dress and wig to portray Mr. Kerouac's domineering mother."

They also lined the Brooklyn Bridge every September 13 (right up until 9/11, when they stopped) and read erotic poetry to people walking home from work.

Kolm has edited a number of anthologies featuring writings by members of the Unbearables, all published by Autonomedia.

Past and present members of the Unbearables include Kolm, Sharon Mesmer, Max Blagg, Chavisa Woods, Michael Carter, Jim Feast, Bonny Finberg, John Farris (d. 2016), Peter Lamborn Wilson, Merry Fortune, Joe Maynard, Alfred Vitale, Shalom Neuman, Jill Rapaport, Thaddeus Rutkowski, Hal Sirowitz, Sparrow, Susan Scutti, Mike Topp, Lee Klein, Carl Watson, Carol Wierzbicki, Bart Plantenga, Tom Savage, Christian X. Hunter, Steve Dalachinsky (d. Sept. 2019), Yuko Otomo, Tsaurah Litzky, Fly and many others, continue to publish and perform in a variety of configurations and at a plethora of venues.

== Bibliography ==
=== Novels ===
- Neo Phobe, written with Jim Feast (Unbearable Books/Autonomedia, 2006)

=== Short fiction collections ===
- The Plastic Factory (Red Dust, 1989)
- Welcome to the Barbecue (Low-Tech Press, 1990)
- Rank Cologne (P.O.N. Press, 1991)
- Divine Comedy (Fly By Night Press, 2013)
- Suburban Ambush (Autonomedia, 2014)
- Night Shift (Autonomedia, 2016)

=== Poetry collections ===
- A Change in the Weather (Sensitive Skin Books, 2017)
- Swimming in the Shallow End (Autonomedia, 2020)

=== Anthologies (as editor) ===
- Unbearables (Autonomedia, 1995)
- Crimes of the Beats (Autonomedia, 1998)
- Help Yourself! (Autonomedia, 2002)
- The Worst Book I Ever Read (Autonomedia, 2009)
- The Unbearables Big Book of Sex (Autonomedia, 2011)
- From Somewhere To Nowhere: The End of the American Dream (Autonomedia, 2017)
