= Andrew Hubner =

American novelist (1962–2022)

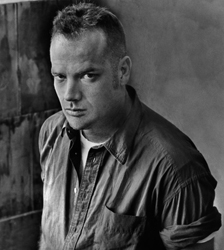
- Born: Andrew Keith Humber; October 16, 1962; Newark, New Jersey, U.S.
- Died: August 10, 2022 (aged 59); Bronx, New York, U.S.
- Education: Appalachian State University; Hunter College (BA, MA); The New School
- Occupations: Author, college lecturer
- Writing career
- Pen name: Drew Hubner; Andrew Huebner
- Period: 1985–2022
- Genres: Historical fiction Short story Contemporary literature
- Website: eastofbowery.blogspot.com

Andrew Keith Hubner (October 16, 1962 – August 10, 2022), also known as Andrew Huebner and Drew Hubner, was an American author and college lecturer. He has been compared to Cormac McCarthy, David Foster Wallace, and Thomas Wolfe.

== Early life ==
Hubner, the son of Jacqueline (née Smith) and George Christopher "Chris" Hubner III, was born in Newark, New Jersey and grew up in Cary, North Carolina. He had two siblings, older brother Dave S. Hubner and younger brother Steve Hubner. He graduated from Cary High School in 1981 and attended Appalachian State University.

He moved to New York City in 1984 where he completed his BA and MA degrees at Hunter College and studied in the MFA program at The New School. Hubner was a first-generation college student.

== Career ==
=== Writer ===
Released in 2001, Hubner's first novel, American By Blood, was a Barnes & Noble Notable Discover Finalist and was optioned by The Kennedy/Marshall Company but stalled in the development phase. This historical novel was inspired by his great-great-grandfather, August, a member of the U.S. Army who arrived one-day too late for Col. George Armstrong Custer's last stand at the Battle of the Little Big Horn. The Boston Review spoke of Hubner alongside authors Kent Haruf and Cormac McCarthy as initiating a new style of American formalism, dependent less on explicit character development than on skillful evocation of time and place: "Huebner’s technique so obviously recalls McCarthy’s—just as Haruf's did—and is at times so brilliant that it wins over even a reader who sees its roots. Taken together, the three form an odd and, I think, remarkable trend, the establishment, on a small scale, of a new formal convention." Other reviewers stumbled over Hubner's unconventional lack of quotation marks, one remarking, "The story is worth telling. Unfortunately, the author lacks the skill to do it justice."

Hubner himself compared his prose to opera, where characters play out their roles on a grand stage, saying "What I am looking for is something operatic, like the circus again where there's something happening all at the same time in three different places."

His second novel, We Pierce, continued to intertwine military history and Hubner's family story, though on a somewhat more intimate scale. Released in 2004, the novel is a fictionalized account of the relationship of Hubner, a war protester, and his brother Colonel Dave Hubner, who was a Gulf War Army veteran. We Pierce was selected as a Notable Book by The New York Times. Kirkus Reviews call it, "A well-written, surprisingly straightforward account of a not-so-straightforward war."

His third book, East of Bowery, began in 2008 as a collaborative web project under the name Drew Hubner, with photographer Ted Barron. The web project evolved into a multi-media presentation held in venues in New York City's Bowery district such as the Bowery Poetry Club and the Gershwin Hotel (now known as The Evelyn). The presentation was accompanied by a changing "art house band", including Jim Coleman from Cop Shoot Cop, cellist Kristen McCord, and guitarist Kurt Wolf from Pussy Galore. In 2019, the show was resurrected at Howl! gallery in Manhattan, where it was featured alongside other readings and performances from artists who were part of the Lower East Side art scene in the 1980s and 1990s.

East of Bowery is a collection of Hubner's short stories about the 1980s and early 1990s in Lower East Side and East Side of New York City, accompanied by black and white photographs that Barron took in 1984 through 1988. One reviewer noted, "East of Bowery, hits all the low spots, giving readers a panoramic tour of the burnt-out squats, copping places, and holding pens that make up a user’s habitual itinerary. Yet unlike such writers as Jim Carroll—who in The Basketball Diaries glamorizes his outlaw adventures—or Irvine Welsh—whose novel Trainspotting emphasizes the stoner humor of its characters, with the jokes always on them—Hubner...is most concerned with tracing his hero to a specific time and place." Of the Bowery, Hubner says, " It was the place that taught me to be an artist."

Hubner became a contributor to Sensitive Skin and The Brooklyn Rail. In 2016, he participated in the Sparkle Street Social & Athletic Club, a performance series at the Howl! Happening gallery, at the invitation of the writer Mike DeCapite. On September 28, 2016, he participated in a reading for Write for Democracy with Janet Manley, Kristen Mathis, Peter Rugh, and Stella Tan–Torres.

=== Academic ===
Hubner taught writing and literature at over twenty colleges, including City University of New York, University of California, Los Angeles, and The New School. He was a lecturer in English literature at Hostos Community College of the City University of New York at the time of his death.

== Personal ==
Hubner married Julie Hedrick in 1986. In 2000/2001, he married actress Sarah Graham Hayes with whom he had three children: Henry, August, and Eleanor. His partner for several years before his death was poet and educator Kristin Mathis.

In interviews and through his semi-biographical novels and short stories, Hubner was open about his blue-collar family's history of violence and the military, along with his own struggles with drugs, addiction, homelessness, and institutionalization.

He co-led Alcoholics Anonymous meetings for decades. He was also commissioner of Little League in Riverdale, Bronx.

In 2022, Hubner died at his home in the Bronx at the age of 59.

== Works ==
=== Books ===
- Huebner, Andrew. American By Blood (Simon & Schuster, 2001) ISBN 9780684857718
- Huebner, Andrew. We Pierce: A Novel. (Simon & Schuster, 2004) ISBN 9780743212786
- Hubner, Drew. East of Bowery. (Sensitive Skin Books, 2011) ISBN 9780983927105

=== Articles ===
- Huebner, Drew. "Tales From the Old East Village Bathroom Stalls." The Evergreen Review. Issue 118 (June, 2009)
- Hubner, Drew. "The Peoples College." Sensitive Skin (June 16, 2010)
- —"Freeman Alley." Sensitive Skin (December 18, 2010)
- —"Mt. Eden 1978-82." Sensitive Skin (October 13, 2011)
- —"Road Kill," Sensitive Skin (October 25, 2013)
- —"Tambourine Man: Gene Clark/No Other Memoir Project 1." Sensitive Skin (May 29, 2014)
- —"Tambourine Man: Gene Clark – Part 2." Sensitive Skin (June 1, 2014)
- —"Tambourine Man: Gene Clark – Part 3." Sensitive Skin (June 6, 2014)
- —"Tambourine Man: Gene Clark – Part 4," Sensitive Skin (June 17, 2014)
- —"Tambourine Man: Gene Clark – Part 5." Sensitive Skin (June 20, 2014)
- —"Tambourine Man: Gene Clark – Part 6." Sensitive Skin (June 23, 2014)
- —"Tambourine Man: Gene Clark – Part 7." Sensitive Skin (June 26, 2014).
- —"Tambourine Man: Gene Clark – Part 8." Sensitive Skin (July 2, 2014)
- —"Tambourine Man: Gene Clark – Part 9." Sensitive Skin (July 4, 2014)
- —"Tambourine Man: Gene Clark – Part 10." Sensitive Skin (July 8, 2014)
- —"Tambourine Man: Gene Clark – Part 11." Sensitive Skin (July 11, 2014)
- —"Tambourine Man: Gene Clark – Part 12." Sensitive Skin (July 11, 2016)
- —"Tambourine Man: Gene Clark – Part 13." Sensitive Skin (July 17, 2016)
- —"Babe Ruth’s Last Game." Sensitive Skin (February 2, 2016).
- —"The Sex Pistols: The Dance Band at the End of the World." Sensitive Skin (October 13, 2016).
- —"East of Bowery & The Circus Life." Sensitive Skin (June 27, 2019).
- —"Books in Conversation: Mike DeCapite with Drew Hubner." The Brooklyn Rail (March 8, 2022).
