= Redtape =

Zine on the New York scene

Redtap 3 (1983) cover by Michael Rheingold

Redtape (a.k.a. Red Tape) was one of the East Village zines of artistic expression published between 1980 and 1992. Published and edited by Michael Carter, Red Tape Magazine featured comics, fiction, poetry, fine art, graphic art and photography; thereby chronicling issues and feelings central the post-punk East Village art scene during the 80’s. These included gentrification, the threat of nuclear war, sexual freedom, squatting, AIDS, no wave art and music, and the prevalence of hard drugs.

== History ==
From 1982 to 1992 Redtape Magazine provided a venue for both established and emerging East Village artists and writers of the downtown New York scene. Redtape communicated innovative artistic ideas of community by dividing its pages between literature and visual art. It specifically encouraged the collaboration of writers and visual artists.

Michael Carter, the editor and publisher of Redtape, said that the purpose of the magazine was "to explore new possibilities and forms of expression, to develop craft and technique without becoming sequestered in an intellectual or academic ivory tower."

Edition launch parties were often held at Danceteria or other downtown nightclubs.

== Publications ==
- For the Left Side of Your Brain (1982)
- Assemblage (1982)
- Redtape: Double Summer Issue (1983)
- ArtDamaged (1984)
- White Lies ( 1984)
- The Cracked Mirror (1986)
- Tragicomix (1992)

== Contributing writers & artists ==
Redtape Magazine literary contributors included Patrick McGrath, Kathy Acker, Max Blagg, Gregory Corso, Constance DeJong, Lynne Tillman, John Farris, Miguel Piñero, and Ed Sanders. Visual art contributions were made by David Wojnarowicz, Mike Cockrill, Christof Kohlhofer, Kiki Smith, Kembra Pfahler, Barbara Ess, Joseph Nechvatal, Greer Lankton, Joe Coleman, James Romberger, and others.
