= Simultaneity =

Simultaneity may refer to:

- Relativity of simultaneity, a concept in special relativity.
- Simultaneity (music), more than one complete musical texture occurring at the same time, rather than in succession
- Simultaneity, a concept in Endogeneity

== See also ==
- Non-simultaneity
- Diversity factor, or simultaneity factor
- Time Structured Mapping
