= Lydia Y. Nichols =

American writer (born 1992)

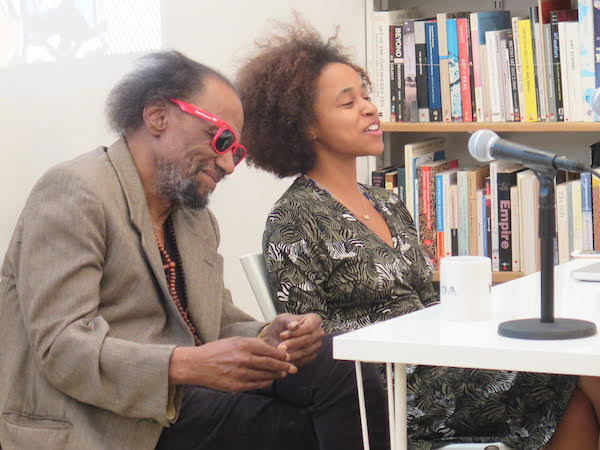
- Nichols with the late writer and gallerist Steve Cannon at the Independent Curators International Hub in New York City, September 2016
- Born: November 29, 1992 (age 32); United States
- Education: Loyola University New Orleans (BA)

Website
- www.lydiaynichols.com

Lydia Y. Nichols (born November 29, 1992) is an American writer, specifically focusing on race, culture and the environment. She currently works as the Chief Cultural Columnist for BayouBrief.com, a public interest news source in Louisiana.

== Early life and education ==
Nichols was born on November 29, 1992, and grew up in New Orleans, Louisiana. She attended Loyola University New Orleans from 2010 to 2013, where she graduated with a Bachelor of Arts in English Language and Literature.

== Work history ==
Nichols first worked as a curator and production manager at Exhibit Be in New Orleans from June 2014 to April 2015, after graduating from Loyola University New Orleans. In this role, she coordinated a large open air exhibition with the work of over 50 artists. She also managed relationships with artists and volunteers, along with budget, logistics and educational programs.

In April 2015, she began working as an independent contractor. In this role, she consults arts organizations and other "culturally engaged foundations" to create programs and research cultural trends in certain areas. She continues her work as an independent contractor to this day. Nichols then held the position of Gallery Manager at Gallery Josephine in Martha's Vineyard, Massachusetts, from May to September in 2016. She managed programs and exhibitions for the summer season as part of her duties in this role. She served as the manager of public programs at Prospect New Orleans, a citywide art triennial with over ten years of history. She worked with her team to develop public programs in this role from April 2017 to September 2017.

== Modern Maroon ==
Modern Maroon is Nichol's personal blog. She describes Modern Maroon as "a living anthology that explores the relationship between contemporary aesthetics and traditions of Black survival independent of the State.".

She breaks down the nomenclature of Modern Maroon into two terms: Modernity and Marronage. She defines modernity as "an aesthetic conveyed through the material culture of the First World, the "developed" Global North, the three most prominent symbols of which are the skyscraper (post industrial intellectual labor-based economy), the car (mobility), and the computer (automated communication and documentation) - with the photograph as an auxiliary through which these symbols have been consecrated and disseminated." She defines Marronage as "the practice of escaping enslavement with no intention of return or of eventual integration into the dominant social fabric.".

Some of her recent posts include: "Culture in the Carceralocene: Keith Calhoun, Flozell Daniels, Chandra McCormick, and Mariah Moore", "In Memoriam: Big Queen Kim Boutte of the Spirit of Fi Yi Yi" and "A Very Self-Centered Review of Jarvis DeBerry's 'I Feel to Believe: Collected Columns'".

Nichols's cultural criticism and other work has been published in 64 Parishes, The Lens, theGrio.com, Pelican Bomb, and Tribes Magazine. She also records the Social Practice podcast. The first episode of the podcast focuses on discerning what is marketed towards consumers, especially considering the "white supremacy, patriarchy, capitalism, and imperialism" present in the world. Nichols will be continuing her work on a play called Don't look away: a dark speculative comedy set in the south in the beginning of the 22nd century. In this work, a climate disaster causes the disappearance of New Orleans. She will continue this work while being in residency at A Studio in the Woods in 2021. A Studio in the Woods is a retreat for artists that focuses on forest preservation and environmental education through art. It is located on the Mississippi River in New Orleans.
