= Thaddeus Rutkowski =

American author (born 1954)

Thaddeus Rutkowski (born 1954) is an American author.

== Early life and education ==
Thaddeus Rutkowski was born in Kingston, Pennsylvania, and later moved to and was raised in Hublersburg, Pennsylvania. He is the son of a Polish-American father and Chinese mother. He is a graduate of Cornell University and Johns Hopkins University.

== Career ==
Rutkowski teaches at Medgar Evers College. He is a member the literary collective The Unbearables. He is also a former member of the editorial board of Many Mountains Moving, a literary journal.

Rutkowski is the author of three novels. The first, Roughhouse: A Novel in Snapshots was released by Kaya Press in 1999, the second, Tetched: A Novel in Fractals, was released by Behler Publications in 2005, and the third, Haywire, was released by Starcherone Books in 2010. He also wrote Violent Outbursts, a collection of flash fiction (Spuyten Duvil 2015), of which John Amen writing in the Los Angeles Review said, "Rutkowski mines the confessional approach, everyday occurrences, and the fantastical, displaying thematic and stylistic range, with most of the pieces in this collection totaling less than five hundred words in length....". Jim Bourey writing in the Broadkill Review said ...." Haywire is a Thaddeus Rutkowski marvel and each short chapter is a wild ride that carries us through the life of a Polish-American/Chinese man."

In 2017, he was named a panelist by the New York Foundation for the Arts on the committee to select the foundation's non-fiction literature awardees.

In 2020 he published a new collection of poetry, "Tricks of Light". John Brantingham writing on the volume in Cultural Weekly remarked that '...he captures the universal sense of alienation that seems to be a part of human existence especially in this new age of COVID".

He is a one-time winner of the Friday-night Nuyorican Poets Cafe Poetry Slam. His work has appeared in The Outlaw Bible of American Poetry, the International Herald Tribune, Potomac Review, the Opinionator blog feature of the New York Times, Iron Horse Review, and Hayden's Ferry Review.

== Critical reception ==
Kirkus Reviews, reviewing Violent Outbursts, wrote "Insouciant, twee, and aphoristic, Rutkowski’s voice handily skewers stupidity".

In writing on Rutkowski's third novel Haywire, Publishers Weekly wrote that "unlike a lot of flash fiction, which tends to be built around a conceit or written toward a punch line, Rutkowski's best moments crackle unimpeded by self-consciousness".

Peter Selgin, in writing about Haywire in the American Book Review said "...."[Rutkowski's] works build their effects cumulatively, through an accretion of discreet moments, ... so reading them is like eating a bag of potato chips, with each non-sequitur scene its own salty, satisfying morsel ('Bet you can't eat just one')"...

== Awards ==
In 2012, Rutkowski was awarded a fellowship in fiction from the New York Foundation for the Arts.

Also in 2012, his book Haywire was named a finalist for Best Fiction by the Asian American Literary Awards.
