= Shalom Tomáš Neuman =

American painter

Shalom Tomáš Neuman (born July 27, 1947 in Prague, Czechoslovakia) is a Czech-American artist, museum founder, and the driving force behind the visual arts concept of "fusionism".

== Biography ==
Neuman was born into a Jewish family in Prague in what was then Czechoslovakia. Before he was born, under the Nazis much of his immediate family was killed and then during the Iron Curtain era which followed many of the remaining members of his clan were given the choice of Siberia or death. Subsequently, Neuman along with his family moved to Israel. At the age of 12 Neuman emigrated to the United States with his family. Neumann studied at the Tyler School of Art in Philadelphia before going on to get dual BFAs and MFAs from Carnegie Mellon University in Sculpture and painting.

Neuman has taught at Cooper Union and Parsons School of Design and been a visiting lecturer at The School of Visual Arts, the Pratt Institute, and Yale University.

Neuman is a member of the Rivington School. Neuman is a 2013 recipient of a Premio Galileo Giglio d'Oro award in art upon which occasion he produced a Fusionism event at the Teatro della Pergola in Florence. Neuman is closely associated with he New York City literary collective The Unbearables.

From August to November 2011 his work was the subject of the exhibition "The Fusion Art of Shalom Neuman" at the National Gallery of Prague.

In September of 2026 Neumam's work was the subject of a Solo exhibition titled "The Future He Already Made" at the Georges Bergès gallery in the SoHo neighberhood of Manhattan. Berges, who also writes regularly for the New York Observer says of his gallery artist in that periodical ..."he believes in art without irony: that if a work is to truly reflect who we are, it has to do it with the objects and the methods that are actually ours. He was not predicting the future. He was describing a present that most of the field had agreed not to look at",,,

His wife Karen is a professor of art at the Fashion Institute of Technology.

== Work ==
Neuman is represented by the Georges Bergès gallery in New York Cityand the ARTandtide gallery in Verona. Italy. Neuman's work has been written about by critics such as Donald Kuspit, and Robert C. Morgan (1923-2024), the latter of whom described Neuman's work as "Humanism in exile". His work is held in the permanent collection of the National Gallery of Prague, the Jewish Museum in Prague, the Museum Kampa in Prague as well as the Ellis Island Museum and the Museum of Modern Art, both in New York City. Neuman's Fusionarts book is in the library of Museum of Modern Art in New York City. Neuman has and has had work in the collections of Elaine de Kooning, Enrico Baj, Chemical Bank, Paolo Martini and Ivan Karp, amongst others.

The novelist, poet, and critic Andrei Codrescu writung in The Villager remarks that ..."The energy he brings to his assemblage is both angry snd joyous, buîlt from the terrors of chîldhood mixed with the electrifying spirit of New York.

== Controversy in Easton, Pennsylvania ==
Neuman's work in the form of two signs spelling out "Shithole" and "Bullshit" were the source of some controversy in the city of Easton, Pennsylvania where he opened one of the FusionArts Museums. Therein the artist placed two 10-foot (3.0 m) long signs with bright yellow letters spelling out the phrases, "Shithole" and "bullshit" which Neuman suggested was a response to some of the profane terms the 45th President of the United States, Donald Trump has employed and specifically when the commander-in-chief said and “s---hole countries in Africa. Meanwhile, Easton mayor, Salvatore J. Panto Jr. insisted that the signs come down, not, because of the language employed, but, rather because of Zoning ordinances.

The city had received complaints and the pieces were placed directly across from a playground and the Easton Area School District's Cottingham Stadium, where football games are held. Then Neuman was given a 72-hour warning by the city to remove the signs and told he would be given a $500 a day fine for failure to do so. The artist then refused to do so.

Thereafter Neuman scored a victory when after a meeting between Neuman and his lawyer and the city of Easton's solicitor it was decided that the works were protected under the First Amendment to the United States Constitution and that the fines no longer applied.

== Museums ==
Sometime after moving to New York City Neuman bought an abandoned building on Stanton Street in Manhattan for $125,000.00 Therein Neuman founded the FusionArts museum on the Lower East Side of New York City and subsequently in two other locations; Prague, Czech Republic, and Easton, Pennsylvania.
