= Steve Dalachinsky =

American poet (1946–2019)

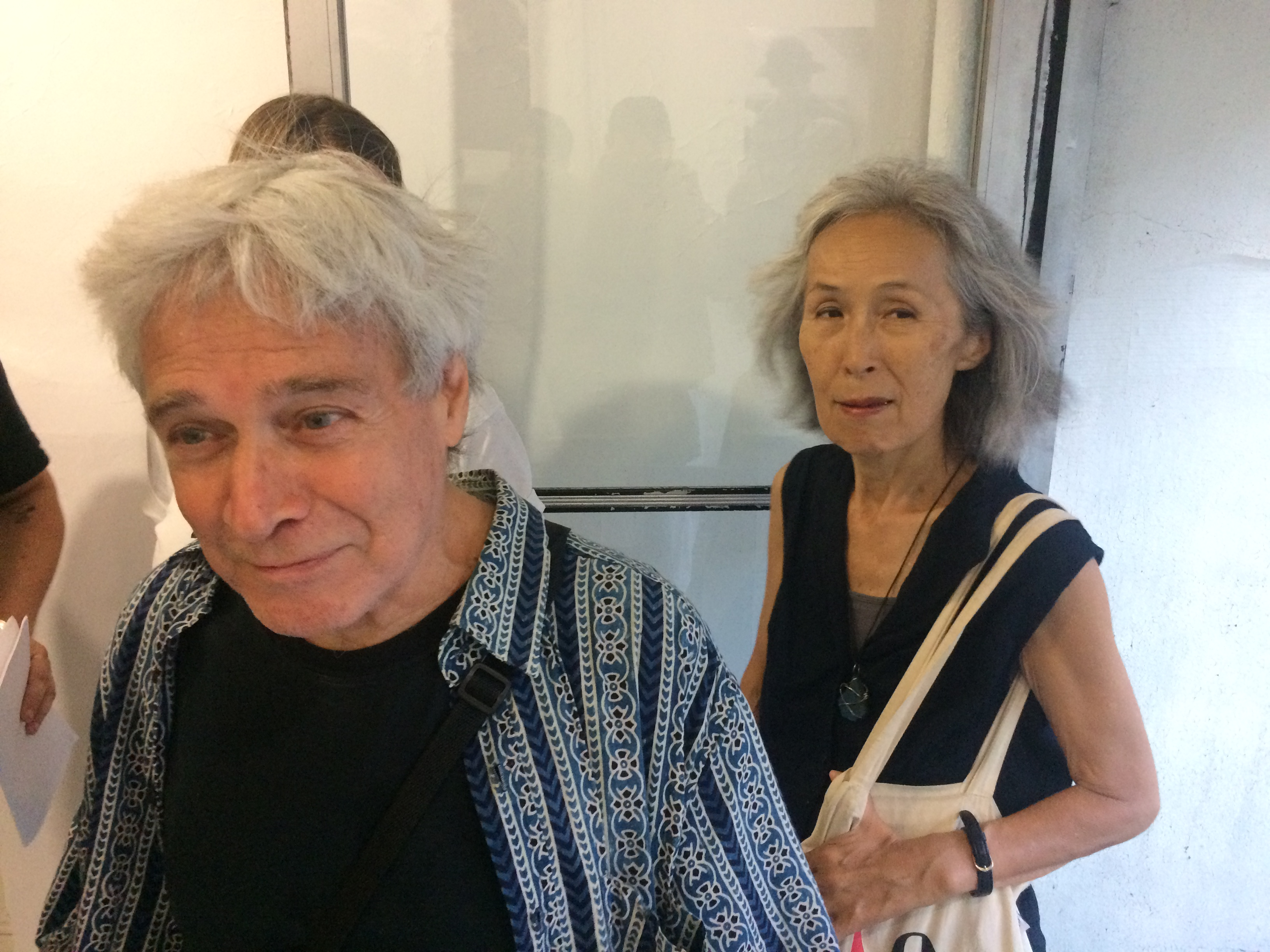
- Dalachinsky (left) and Otomo (right)
- Born: Steven Donald Dalachinsky; September 29, 1946; Brooklyn, New York, U.S.
- Died: September 16, 2019 (aged 72); Long Island, New York, U.S.
- Occupation: Poet
- Spouse: Yuko Otomo
- Writing career
- Notable works: Where Day and Night Become One; A Superintendent’s Eyes; The Final Nite & Other Poems: Complete Notes from a Charles Gayle Notebook
- Notable awards: Ordre des Arts et des Lettres

Steven Donald Dalachinsky (September 29, 1946 – September 16, 2019) was an American downtown New York City poet, active in the music, art, and free jazz scenes. He wrote poetry for most of his life and read frequently at Michael Dorf's club the Knitting Factory, the Poetry Project and the Vision Festival, an Avant-jazz festival held annually on the Lower East Side of New York City. Dalachinsky also read his works in Japan, France and Germany. He collaborated with many musicians, writing liner notes for artists: William Parker, Susie Ibarra, Matthew Shipp, Joe McPhee, Nicola Hein, Dave Liebman, Roy Campbell, Daniel Carter, Joëlle Léandre, Kommissar Hjuler, Thurston Moore, Sabir Mateen, Jim O'Rourke, and Mat Maneri.

Dalachinsky authored a compendium of poetry written while listening to saxophonist Charles Gayle perform throughout New York City, a collection of poems which focused on his time as a superintendent at an apartment building in Soho, and other books. Along with pianist Matthew Shipp, he co-authored the book Logos and Language: A Post-Jazz Metaphorical Dialogue and collaborated with French photographer Jacques Bisceglia on Reaching Into The Unknown. His spoken word albums include Incomplete Directions and a collaboration with Shipp on the album Phenomena of Interference. Dalachinsky's works also appeared in several journals and anthologies.

He received the Franz Kafka Prize, Acker Award, PEN Oakland/Josephine Miles Literary Award and was nominated for a 2015 Pushcart Prize. He lived in Manhattan with his wife, painter and poet Yuko Otomo.

== Early life ==
Let’s put it this way, I’m a poet – or let’s put it more succinctly – what I’ve done for the better part of my life – besides complain and be rude to people – is write poetry – I write poetry, you know? That’s what I do.

— ~Dalachinsky,

Dalachinsky was born in 1946, Brooklyn, New York, "right after the last big war and has managed to survive lots of little wars", which is how he is frequently described. He grew up in the Midwood section of the borough that was mostly an Italian and Jewish neighborhood with parents who were working class and a sister, Judy. Dalachinsky said he was "always writing" at an early age and was also "involved in art". His earliest notebooks of his writings that have survived go back to when he was between the ages of 13 and 15. He was once kicked out of a Hebrew school because he was "wearing a cross", and hung out with the Italian kids in the neighborhood which "framed his perception of being Jewish", according to him. Dalachinsky graduated from Midwood High School and briefly attended Brooklyn College.

Dalachinsky started taking art lessons at the Pratt Institute where for 18 months he first attempted his hand at painting, eventually turning to writing poetry full-time. It was during this period in his life when he discovered beat poetry and found the poetry scene in Manhattan. He was given copies of Lawrence Ferlinghetti’s A Coney Island of the Mind and Allen Ginsberg’s Howl, which he says changed his style of writing. Dalachinsky was also influenced by the writings of Franz Kafka, Albert Camus, Ezra Pound, Delmore Schwartz, Federico Garcia Lorca, and William Blake, especially the work Auguries of Innocence by Blake. Besides writers, he counted obsession, socio-political angst, human disappointment, jazz music and abstract visual art among his influences. Dalachinsky related that writing process was as if "spontaneity mixed with a conscious pushing" and a "descriptive transformation". His works have been portrayed as leaning towards "transforming the image rather than merely describing it".

For 19 years, starting in the 1980s, he wrote some of his poems while listening to live jazz music, going to free jazz saxophonist Charles Gayle's performances, creating poems on scraps of paper. In 2006, Dalachinsky published a book of poems devoted entirely to Gayle, (Note: The Final Nite & Other Poems: Complete Notes from a Charles Gayle Notebook, 1987–2006 ISBN 978-1-9332-5415-9) with the poems appearing chronologically in the order of the venues where Gayle performed at. The collection was honored in 2007 with a PEN Oakland/Josephine Miles Literary Award. The book is also unusual because not only is it documenting the music, but also Dalachinsky's state of mind at the precise moment of capturing a musical phrase. Sometimes when Gayle's performance came with a sermon or lecture, commenting on topics like abortion or racial separatism, Dalachinsky would react with his poems reflecting the mood:

i am angry with him
for gross behavioral disorders
but when i trap my oppressors
behind my eyes
it is the white of their greed
i see

— Dalachinsky,

Dalachinsky also released a collection of poems, titled A Superintendent’s Eyes, ISBN 978-1-5702-7272-1, which focused on his time as a superintendent at a Spring Street apartment building in Soho. It was published by The Unbearables, whom both him and his wife have a connection with, and describe themselves as a "loose collective of noir humorists, beer mystics, anarchists, neophobes and passionate debunkers". In his 2013 review of the book, Alan Kaufman wrote: "It is the single most important volume of poetry to appear in the last ten years...he is the poet that America has been waiting for to free our national verse from its stratospheric sense of self-importance and return us to a poetry of flesh and heart, song and cement, just as Whitman's Leaves of Grass did in the nineteenth Century". The poems were written over 20 years and described by Kaufman as, "ash can sonatas to lovemaking with wife, eating out in restaurants, illness, cancelled hopes, money worries, cash scores, tenant complaints, landlord humiliations and ruminations on drug addiction". In one poem written while his wife was away in Japan, and he was relocating his writing space, he begins:

snowflowers breathe into my face
i am stuck like the hands of 2 lovers circling
i know my shapes
but even children grow into wars

— Dalachinsky,

In 2018, Dalachinsky released his poetry collection Where Day and Night Become One: The French Poems: 1983-2017ISBN 978-0-9981-4403-0, which assembled more than 30 years of writing journals from this trips to Paris. It was published by the New York-based publishing company Great Weather for Media, and was the Silver Award-Winner in the 31st Annual IBPA Benjamin Franklin Awards in Poetry. In his review of the book in Sensitive Skin, Valery Oisteanu wrote: "The free-wheeling Dalachinsky jumps easily from free verse to concrete poetry, from chaotic typography to whimsical designs, word constructions and deconstructions, puns, sound percussion ('tachada, tachada'), plays on names and words à la Duchamp or 'mailtrate de la langue a la Americane'". The poems were written over 34 years and described by Oisteanu as, "a dream-like literary mindscape peppered with head-spinning references, using an erudite knowledge, ostentatious name-dropping and a post-beatnik morphistic narrative of rare synchronicity. A perfect collage of cut-ups; train-of-thought à la Allen Ginsberg; an awkwardly unsettling geography laced with hidden meaning". Addressing a loved one, Dalachinsky writes:

as your skin becomes a thin casing for disappearing bones, like a skin of a drum wearing thin… I dream… that you might be miraculously cured so I might want all of you here with me right now as the sun begins to cross the roofs across the way & the wind makes the leaves into hands

— Dalachinsky,

== Readings, collaborations and writings ==
The process for me is both the forced intention of wanting or needing to write a poem mixed with the free flow of writing a poem...I try to subvert a lot of linearity intentionally because I’m so bored...I’m a romantic writer.

— ~Dalachinsky,

Dalachinsky read throughout the New York City area including at the: Poetry Project, Vision Festival, ISSUE Project Room and the Knitting Factory. and also read in San Francisco. Abroad, he had read his works in Japan, Germany and England, where he read his Insomnia Poems, a collaboration with composer Pete Wyer for BBC Radio 3. In France, Dalachinsky performed extensively. He read in Bordeaux, Sète and in Paris at Les Instants Chavirés and the L'Olympic Café. He read at the Centre international de poésie in Marseille, Maison de la Poésie de Nantes at Pannonica, participated in the Sons d'Hiver Festival and the Val-de Marne International Poetry Festival.

In 2011, he collaborated with French duet art-rockers The Snobs on Massive Liquidity, the first of three records with the band, including the electronic and rock sounding ec(H)o-system in 2015. In 2015, he worked with Alex Lozupone's group, Eighty Pound Pug on a jazz-metal album; and with German visual artist Sig Bang Schmidt on Flying Home In 2017, he collaborated with his wife on two projects, Frozen Heatwave and Black Magic. Dalachinsky penned liner notes for recordings of several musicians: Roscoe Mitchell, Charles Gayle, Anthony Braxton, James Blood Ulmer, Matthew Shipp, Roy Campbell, Assif Tsahar, Derek Bailey and Rashied Ali. Additionally, he collaborated with musicians: William Parker, Susie Ibarra, Matthew Shipp, Roy Campbell, Daniel Carter, Sabir Mateen, Mat Maneri, Federico Ughi, Loren Mazzacane Connors, Rob Brown, Tim Barnes and Jim Rourke.

Other books and chapbooks he wrote include: Quicksand, The Invisible Ray with artwork by Shalom Neuman, Lautreamont's Laments, Dream Book, In Glorious Black and White, St. Lucie, Are We Not MEN & Fake Book, Trial and Error in Paris and Where Night and Day Become One, from his trips to Paris. His spoken word albums include Incomplete Directions, Phenomena of Interference with Matthew Shipp and I thought it was the end of the world then the end of the world happened again with Federico Ughi.

In 2015, he released a heavy metal album, Leave The Door Open. Culture Catch stated "Dalachinsky's self-deprecating Brooklyn humor and existentialist beat musings, more usually accompanied by free jazz, prove highly compatible with this doomier sound keyed on Lozupone's electronically combined bass and guitar. Really, what better to accompany a 9/11 poem that starts, 'I thought it was the end of the world/And then the end of the world happened again'?"

In 2019, Steve Dalachinsky released his third and last collaboration with The Snobs, Pretty in the Morning, on French label Bisou Records. The album was recorded live at Espace En Cours in Paris in October 2017 with an extended line-up of the band to accompany his voice: Duck Feeling (guitar, Mellotron, synthesizer, drum machine), Mad Rabbit (bass, sampler), Devil Sister (theremin, trumpet, xaphoon), Fuzzy Weasel (guitar, effects).

=== Anthologies ===
His poems are included in the anthologies:

Beat Indeed,	Writers Beyond the Margin	Downtown Poets
Resistance	A History of Jews and the Lower East Side	Help Yourself
Viviparous Blenny	Outlaw Bible of American Poetry	Ragged Lion
Hurricane Blues	Up is Up but So is Down	La tentation du silence
Le gout du Jazz	An Eye for an Eye Makes the Whole World Blind	The Unbearables
The Worse Book I Ever Read	Off the Cuffs	In the Arms of Words

=== Journals ===
His works have appeared in the journals:

88	Mima'amakim	Lost and Found Times	The Wandering Hermit Review
Bathtub Gin	Home Planet News	The GW Review	Gare Maritime
Unarmed	Polisz	Alternating Current	N.Y. Arts Magazine
6x6	Cannot Exist	Blue Beat Jacket	Alpha Beat Soup
The Helix	Tribes	Evergreen Review	Xtant
Long Shot	Unlikely Stories	Ratapallax	Xpressed
The Brooklyn Rail

== Personal life and death ==
Dalachinsky lived in Manhattan with his wife, painter and poet Yuko Otomo. He died of a stroke on September 16, 2019, at a hospital in Long Island, New York, at the age of 72, thirteen days before his 73rd birthday.

== Books dedicated to jazz ==
I wrote theses several hundred poems while listening to the music–the rhythms–the movement–the physical space I was in and whatever was happening or had happened around me just all fit together.

—

Avant-garde jazz has been a major inspiration for his writing, with five books of his poems dedicated solely to jazz musicians. All of them being written while listening to the music live.

- The Final Nite: Complete Notes from a Charles Gayle Notebook - written over 20 years of listening to saxophonist Charles Gayle.
- Logos and Language: A Post-Jazz Metaphorical Dialogue - a collaboration with pianist Matthew Shipp.
- The Mantis, - a chapbook for pianist Cecil Taylor covering 50 years, the first written when he was 19.
- Reaching Into The Unknown - collaboration with photographer Jacques Bisceglia written from 1967 through 2011.
- Long Play E.P. - a small chapbook for saxophonist Evan Parker.

== Discography ==
Electronic, experimental, spoken word, abstract and poetry albums (including collaborations):

- Incomplete Directions
- I Thought It Was The End Of The World Then The End Of The World Happened Again
- Phenomena of Interference
- Thin Air
- Merci Pour le Visite
- Massive Liquidity (with The Snobs)
- The Bill Has Been Paid
- The Fallout Of Dreams
- ec(H)o - system (with The Snobs)
- Pray For Me
- Insomnia Poems
- Fluxporn/the NO!art Statements (w/Boris Lurie & Dietmar Kirves, Kommissar Hjuler, Mama Baer)
- Genconhjulachinsky (w/Conrad Schnitzler & Gen Ken Montgomery, Mama Baer)
- Justifiable Homicide (with Alex Lozupone and Pete M. Wyer)
- Gotta Keep Moving (Steve Dalachinsky & Albey Balgochian)
- Pretty in the Morning (with The Snobs)

== See also ==
- Beat Scene
- Leonard Cohen, Canadian Beat Generation poet & songwriter
- Literary Kicks
- European free jazz
- Bibliography of jazz
- List of jazz musicians
