= Brian Gormley =

American painter

Brian Gormley (born New York City) is an internationally exhibited American painter living and working in both Ireland and Bucks County, Pennsylvania. His hybrid works are greatly influenced by the abstract expressionist and graffiti art movements.

Gormley came of age artistically during the New York City art boom years of the nineteen-eighties when both neo-expressionism and street art raged as noted in an essay in the catalog for Gormley's exhibition with Scott Borofsky alongside works by Keith Haring and Jean Michel Basquiat at the Brattleboro Museum and Art Center......"Though Brian Gormley made few forays into street art per se, his paintings nonetheless reflect its energy and influence. In the mid-1980s, Gormley began showing expressionistic oils with figural motifs, distinguished by wild color and bravura brushwork."

Of Irish ancestry Gormley today often exhibits in ancestral homeland where he maintains a residence. Such showings have included at The Cooper House Gallery (November 21 – December 3, 2013) and works from his collaborative book with poet Michael Carter, "On Bolus Head", at the Trinity College Library (March 25 until April 30, 2013) both in Dublin.
