= Time Structured Mapping =

Time Structured Mapping (TSM) is a score based system created and used by the composer Pete M Wyer. It uses the bar-lines found in conventional musical scores to indicate durational periods during which performers, who may include actors, singers, dancers, poets as well as musicians, are given instructions, which may include conventional musical scoring or improvisational guidelines. The system allows large and sometimes disparate groups to improvise together coherently, or to combine improvisation with scored music or with other media. It has been used to get orchestras, including the Orchestra of the Swan (see below), to improvise effectively and in educational projects, to combine student musicians with professionals, such as with Welsh National Opera and to combine other media such as dance and poetry with musical improvisation in a structured form, such as with Miro Dance Theatre, Philadelphia.

The flexibility of the system has allowed for the combination of musicians from very different backgrounds, as well as disparate ensembles with players of very different standards. Works generally combine improvisation with conventional scoring and move frequently from one system to the other. The synchronisation using 'clock-time' as a basis has also enabled works made up of players who are spatially separated such as with Four Bridges which was performed simultaneously in Britain, Germany, America and India, it allows for works which alter the conventional relationship of the composer with the musician by involving the performer directly into the creative process.

== Beginnings - The Simultaneity Project ==
In 2004 Wyer began creating Simultaneity works: works that made recordings at the same time in different locations. The first recordings took place around Columbus Circle, New York – Wyer mapped out a circumference that passed through the Time Warner building and around the periphery of Columbus Circle itself and, with the help of a team of volunteer staff from WNYC radio, made a series of simultaneous recordings that, when played back across multiple speakers, gave what he described as a ‘God’s ear view’ of the location – the experience of being at all points simultaneously; cars, subway trains and people moved from speaker to speaker, featuring the endless rotation of revolving doors that interfaced the very contrasting sonic landscape of the interior of the Time Warner Building with the bustling Manhattan streets outside.

This led to Simultaneity recordings that were not made in the same location: in December 2004, with volunteers primarily from CEC Canada's online forum, a recording was made simultaneously in countries around the world: volunteers were asked to record exactly the same twenty minutes of their environment wherever they were in the world, regardless of time-zone, but to include something that marked the hour changing. Volunteers recorded dawn choruses (Australia), tolling bells (Australia), railway station announcements (New Zealand), clocks in a clock shop (San Francisco), ambient sound in Police Square (Manhattan), evening traffic (Berlin), the backstage at English National Opera (London) late night rains (Tunis) late night chatter (Mumbai), the sounds of the jungle (Laos), dogs barking (northern Alaska). Resulting in a complex array of sounds that coalesced into a moment of intensity as the hour struck and then dissipated back to the disparate ambient environments.

== Time structured mapping ==
In his search to incorporate the philosophy of Simultaneity within western musical systems, Wyer returned to a frequent inspiration; birdsong; struck by the endless combinations and re-combinations of the songs of the dawn chorus he began considering ways to create systems that would enable simultaneous solos that combined in musically intelligent, coherent ways - that necessarily moved away from the western convention of counting a beat for each bar.

In 2005 Wyer made his first Time Structured Maps using the same basic scores as might be used for an orchestra but where each bar-line represented a period of 30 seconds rather than a count and each ‘bar’ consisted of a set of instructions for how to improvise during that time period, which might be very specific or left ambiguous. The result was a system that enabled musicians from all backgrounds to play together, and to incorporate other forms such as dance, speech etc. within a score.

The first significant work for the system was for the Orchestra of the Swan with a Time Structured Map (TSM) based work called Traveller, There Are No Paths, Paths Are Made By Walking created in the summer of 2005. A second, much more ambitious work, Four Bridges, was performed in November 2005, it combined the ideas of Simultaneity with the Time Structured Mapping system: the Orchestra of the Swan played from the score in England while pianist Burkhard Finke in Frankfurt, microtonal vocal specialist Toby Twining in Boston and Indian Classical singer Anand Thakore in Mumbai performed simultaneously from the same score, without hearing each other – each performance was recorded and later combined into a work for 8 speakers, which was later broadcast on WNYC New Sounds.

In 2009, Time Structured Mapping was used for the creation of the one-hour Insomnia Poems for BBC Radio 3 (Jazz On 3) which combined post-beat poet Steve Dalachinsky with a five-piece band consisting of soprano, Evelyne Beech, electronics and processing, Mike Cross, clarinets and saxes, Chris Cundy, bass, Robert Perry and Pete M Wyer on guitar, piano with found sounds and manipulations – each performing with a synchronized stopwatch. The piece was popularly received, retaining the energy and spontaneity of improvisation within the dynamic and tonal structure of a conventionally scored piece.

Further development, funded by the Arts Council Of England, enabled workshops which in turn led to new works using the system: Welsh National Opera used it for a series of educational works alongside their 2010 UK tour, the Orchestra of the Swan also using TSM scores for Four Sonnets, a twenty-minute work created in July 2010 which combined improvisation within the orchestra with text fragments submitted according to the score from members of the public and Listening To The Sky, a one hour work for chamber group with sound design, which used a TSM score to combine orchestra performance with sounds created according to the Time Structured Map.
