= Diane Burns =

Anishinaabe and Chemehuevi artist

Diane M. Burns
- Born: January 11, 1956; Lawrence, Kansas, U.S.
- Died: December 22, 2006 (aged 50); New York City, U.S.
- Education: Institute of American Indian Arts; Barnard College
- Known for: poetry
- Notable work: Riding the One-Eyed Ford
- Children: 1

Diane Marie Burns (January 11, 1956 – December 22, 2006) was an Anishinaabe (Lac Court Oreilles) and Chemehuevi artist, known for her poetry and performance art highlighting Native American experience. After moving to New York City, she become involved with the Lower East Side poetry community, including the Nuyorican Poets Café.

== Background ==
Burns was born in Lawrence, Kansas. Her mother was Anishinaabe; her father was Chemeheuvi. Her family moved for her parents' work at various tribal schools, including the Sherman Indian School in Riverside, California and the Wahpeton Indian School in Wahpeton, North Dakota. Burns noted that she disliked her time in Wahpeton.

Burns attended the Institute of American Indian Arts (IAIA) in Santa Fe, New Mexico from 1972 to 1974, and Barnard College (the women's college within Columbia University) in New York from 1974 to 1978. Burns was awarded a certificate of distinction for poetry from New Mexico State University in April 1974, and a Congressional Certificate of Merit in May 1974 for "excellence in scholastic achievement, community service, and civil affairs" for her efforts at IAIA. While finishing at IAIA, she was admitted to University of Minnesota's College of Liberal Arts, as well as to Barnard, for the fall 1974 term. According to Burns, she decided to go to Barnard after passing through the campus while trying to find her way to a comic book shop, and finding herself impressed. While she chose Barnard and attended, there are conflicting reports about whether she finished her undergraduate degree at Columbia.

During her first year at Barnard, she told the college newspaper that she was given the name "Mah gee-osh qwe" by her grandmother. She is also described as one of just a handful of Indigenous students at the college.

== Painting ==
Though better known for her poetry, Burns was also an accomplished visual artist. She exhibited paintings in the 1974 Minnesota Governor's Invitational and the 1979 American Indian Community House Gallery Invitational. Via Gambaro Gallery, which was launched by Retha Walden Gambaro and Stephen Gambaro to spotlight contemporary Native American artists, included Agard's work in its 1980 National American Indian Women's Art Show.

== Writing and poetry ==
Burns often used humor to discuss both anti-Indigenous sentiments and everyday Native American experiences. Both come together in her piece "Sure You Can Ask Me a Personal Question," as she outlines a fictional conversation with a White woman interrogating the poet's identity and then piling on a litany of stereotypes. Her work Alphabet Serenade provides an early critique of gentrification of the Lower East Side.

Burns performed her poetry at numerous local New York City venues, including the American Indian Community House. She was particularly committed to performance. In an interview with Joseph Bruchac, she said, "I would rather read poetry in front of an audience more than almost anything else." Her work "Big Fun" is notable as a poetic riff on "49" songs, a popular post-powwow social music genre. A recitation of this poem is featured by Ho-Chunk and Luiseno (Pechanga) visual artist Sky Hopinka, who presented a video homage to Burns as part of his exhibit at the Museum of Modern Art, I'll Remember You as You Were, not as What You'll Become (2016). Burns' combination of humor and performance can also be seen in an apparent exchange with Anishinaabe (Fon du Lac) writer and comedian Jim Northrup. In his book Anishinaabe Syndicated: A View from the Rez, Northrup describes reading poetry at the Nuyorican Poets Café and then offering Burns wild rice. In a set-aside text, he then writes (apparently to Burns): "Question: Is that really a poem or did you just make it up? Answer: Yes."

Burns shared the stage with numerous high-profile poets and writers, including Simon Ortiz, Ntozake Shange, June Jordan, Linda Hogan, Maurice Kenny, Jessica Hagedorn, Allen Ginsberg, Barbara Barg, Fay Chiang, Lois Elaine Griffith, Paula Martinac, and Rashidah Ismaili. In addition to the Nuyorican Poets Café, she frequently performed at St. Mark's Church in-the-Bowery (where her memorial was held) and the Bowery Poetry Club. The writer Steve Cannon credited Burns with enabling his work with the Tribes magazine and A Gathering of the Tribes gallery to exist, since she provided material support and labor after he lost his home in a fire and was struggling with sight-impairment.

In 1986, she was one of a handful of poets invited by the Sandinistans to attend the Rubén Dario Poetry Festival in Nicaragua. She travelled with Harjo, Ginsberg, and Pedro Pietri.

Her poetry has been published or re-published in a number of journals and poetry collections, including two collections edited by Joseph Bruchac, Songs from This Earth on Turtle's Back and Survival This Way, and in a 2020 collection edited by Joy Harjo, When the Light of the World was Subdued, Our Songs Came Through. Individual poems were included in various magazines and journals in the 1980s. Burns is described as an important figure within the Native American contemporary arts movement within the book No Reservation: New York Contemporary Native American Art Movement. Other books that include her poetry include: Aloud: Voices from the Nuyorican Poets Café, American Indian Literature: An Anthology, Indivisible: Poems for Social Justice, Native American Literature: An Anthology, Truth & Lies: An Anthology of Poems, New Worlds of Literature, A Multicultural Reader, Bowery Women: Poems, and That's What She Said: Contemporary Poetry and Fiction by Native American Women.

== Notable works ==
Her only published book was a collection of sixteen poems called Riding the One-Eyed Ford (1981).

Burns had written material for a novel, entitled Tequila Mockingbird, which was never completed. One page from that manuscript was published in the journal Tribes, published by A Gathering of the Tribes.
