= Mike DeCapite =

American writer

- Born: 1962 (age 63–64); Cleveland, Ohio
- Occupation: Writer

Mike DeCapite is an American writer whose published work includes the novels Through the Windshield and Jacket Weather, the chapbooks Sitting Pretty and Creamsicle Blue, and the short-prose collection Radiant Fog.

== Through the Windshield ==
When he was twenty, he moved to Cleveland's Southside, also known as Tremont, the neighborhood where he set Through the Windshield, his first novel. Through the Windshield was conceived as a depiction of a year on the Southside, and early pieces were written there in summer 1985. DeCapite began writing Through the Windshield in earnest later that year in London. He continued working on it after moving to Brooklyn, New York, in 1987, and finished it there in 1990.

Excerpts from DeCapite's Through the Windshield first appeared in three issues of Cuz, a literary magazine edited by Richard Hell and published by the Poetry Project at St. Mark's Church, in New York City, between 1988 and 1989. DeCapite did his first reading in January 1988 at the Poetry Project at St. Mark's Church.

Through the Windshield circulated widely in manuscript and was excerpted in numerous small magazines. In 1998, DeCapite, living in San Francisco, started Sparkle Street Books and published it himself. The novel was republished in 2014 by Red Giant Books.

== Ruined for Life! ==
In 1995, living in San Francisco, DeCapite started work on a second novel, Ruined for Life!, still unpublished, which he worked on for the next dozen years. By the time he put it aside, DeCapite was back in New York, to which he'd returned in 2005. Excerpts from Ruined for Life! have appeared in 3:AM, angle magazine, and Sensitive Skin.

In 1999, DeCapite's story "Sitting Pretty", an outtake from Ruined for Life! was published as a CUZ Edition, a series of chapbooks edited by Richard Hell. In 2003, "Sitting Pretty" was anthologized, along with novel excerpts by DeCapite's father, Raymond, in The Italian American Reader.

== Creamsicle Blue ==
In 2012, DeCapite published his essay "Creamsicle Blue" as a chapbook. Novelist Karen Lillis reviewed Creamsicle Blue for her blog Karen the Small Press Librarian. She called it "a spectacular piece of writing" and, in an interview with DeCapite, described it as a "27 page piece of nonfiction with the scope of a novel and the depth of a meditation."

== Radiant Fog ==
In 2003 and 2004, while living in San Francisco, DeCapite wrote a personal-essay column for an arts magazine in Cleveland called angle. Most of these pieces were later collected in DeCapite's Radiant Fog (Sparkle Street Books, 2013).

== Sparkle Street Social & Athletic Club ==
In 2016, DeCapite—with photographer Ted Barron—presented Sparkle Street Social & Athletic Club, a series of three events featuring readings, photographs, and films, whose participants included DeCapite, Barron, Maggie Dubris, Max Blagg, Vincent Katz, and Lucy Sante.

== Jacket Weather ==
DeCapite's novel Jacket Weather was published by Soft Skull Press on October 12, 2021, and made the IndieBound's October 2021 Indie Next List and Winter 2022 Reading Group Indie Next List. The book is a love story, told in fragments, about Mike and June, who knew each other in 1980s New York and who get together in the city thirty years later. It sketches the arc of their first six months over a background of their first ten years. "Jacket Weather covers ten years, but it collapses them so that everything that happens in one of those ten Septembers is in the September part of the book, and the same with October and so on. It seems true to my experience. You remember that something happened in a particular month or season but not necessarily what year," DeCapite told Shawn Mishak, in Cleveland Review of Books.

In July 2024, Lucy Sante chose Jacket Weather as one of her 10 best books of the century for the New York Times article "The 10 Best Books of the 21st Century".

== Elsewhere ==
Text from Through the Windshield was used in the 1993 Pere Ubu Story of My Life outtake "Through the Windshield" (released as a bonus track on the Story of My Life reissue, Mercury, 2007). The book's title was used for the Chargers Street Gang LP Through the Windshield (Get Hip Records, 2003) and the Disturbances of Spring song "Through the Windshield" (Blurring in the Corner of Your Eye, Disturbances of Spring, 2015).). A passage from DeCapite's chapbook Creamsicle Blue inspired Joel Murach's song "Orange Light", on the Low Rollers CD Mexican Stingray Doctor, and an outtake from his novel Jacket Weather inspired "Yellow Green" on Murach's Lost in the Last Light.

Through the Windshield was featured in the discussion of "Why Bob Dylan Matters" at an event sponsored by the Rock and Roll Hall of Fame and Case Western Reserve University, November 16, 2017. Classicist and Dylanologist Tom Palaima also read from Radiant Fog (Sparkle Street Books, 2013) at the 32 minute mark. Palaima and fellow Classicist Paul Hay also did an entire event called Through the Windshield: Unseen People in Big Cities September 28, 2018 that featured readings (including from Through the Windshield) and songs that make us notice and care about overlooked people in cities spanning from ancient Rome to Cleveland in the third millennium.

In July 2026, a piece by writer Philip Adams about Mike DeCapite and his novel-in-progress appeared in the London Observer, followed by an extended version of the piece at Substack.

== Bibliography ==
- Travel Notes (Price of a Drink Press, 1995)
- Through the Windshield (Sparkle Street Books, 1998; Red Giant Books, 2014)
- Sitting Pretty (CUZ Editions, 1999; anthologized in The Italian American Reader, William Morrow, 2003, and Harper Paperbacks, 2005)
- Creamsicle Blue (Sparkle Street Books, 2012)
- Radiant Fog (Sparkle Street Books, 2013)
- Jacket Weather (Soft Skull Press, 2021)
