= Pete M. Wyer =

British composer (born 1964)

Pete M Wyer
- Born: 24 March 1964 (age 62); Cheltenham, England
- Genres: Classical music, jazz, opera, ballet
- Occupations: Musician, composer, music teacher

Pete M. Wyer (born 24 March 1964) is a British composer.

== Early life ==
Wyer was born in Cheltenham, England.

== Career ==
He began his career as a guitarist with pop and jazz bands in the 1980s. He became a music teacher in the 1990s, while developing as a composer.

=== Concert works ===
He composed May Peace Prevail On Earth, for the Royal Philharmonic Orchestra, with London voices, Burntwood girls choir and baritone Matthew Sharp, which premiered at The Barbican, London, in 2003.

If I Had Known I Was Dreaming (for Japan 2001 Festival) premiered at The Purcell Room, London with soprano, Evelyne Beech and the Tippett String Quartet.

Chelsea-Chelsea (for the Juilliard School) premiered at Jazz at Lincoln Center, New York in 2005, with two saxophones and string quartet and live link from Chelsea London, with poetry read by Steve Rubie at the 606 Club, London.

Insomnia Poems is a one-hour work inspired by the Insomnia Poems of Steve Dalachinsky that was broadcast on BBC Radio 3's 'Jazz on 3' in March 2009.

Wyer is the Associate Composer of the Orchestra of the Swan, Stratford on Avon.

=== Opera and ballet ===
Wyer's music has often been inspired by other art forms, particularly dance, for which he has written many scores, including: Discoveries Uncovered, choreographed by Jessica Lang for the Juilliard School in 2003, and 'Senbazuru' also with Lang, created for Juilliard's centenary in 2006 for soprano, alto, tenor and bass with large orchestra.

The Far Shore was commissioned by the British Council and English National Ballet in 2010, and recorded by the London Symphony Orchestra. It was to be performed for "Great Britain Day" at the Shanghai World Expo in front of Prince Andrew and other public figures, but was withdrawn.

He has a long-standing relationship with film-maker Tobin Rothlein and choreographer Amanda Miller, artistic directors of the Philadelphia-based company, Miro Dance Theatre.

His operatic works include Cremenville in 2006, for which he also wrote the libretto and Numinous City, a work in progress commissioned by the Royal Opera House's development arm, ROH2.

In 2002 he formed the music-theatre company, SharpWire, with actor, singer and cellist, Matthew Sharp. Together they created a 'multi-media song-cycle' at Battersea Arts Centre, London, entitled Adam's Apple, based on Wyer's settings of poets Charles Simic, Federico García Lorca, Giuseppe Ungaretti and others. The work featured acting, singing, choreography and film (by Tobin Rothlein, who also designed the set) and toured the United Kingdom in 2004, with additional performances at the Philadelphia Live Arts Festival and a guest performance and interview on the long-running show, New Sounds, on WNYC, New York. The company produced several experimental works including Saccades And Fixations and Cremenville, written for Opera North's Resonance programme in 2006.

In 2007, Wyer wrote an opera-storytelling work Johnny's Midnight Goggles as a one-man show, later performed by Sharp. It premiered at the Brighton Festival in 2008, with performances at Chichester, Bath, Glastonbury, Edinburgh and other festivals. Sharp also performed the sequel, Finkelstein's Castle.

== Time structured mapping ==
Time Structured Mapping is a scoring system that uses the convention of barlines to indicate durations and gives guidelines for improvisation, text, movement, alongside standard musical notation. It is in a way similar to graphic notation scores and the scores of Musique Concrète composers. It led to a variety of exploratory new works, including the one-hour Insomnia Poems based on the book of poetry by Steve Dalachinsky. It was recorded for BBC Radio 3's 'Jazz on 3' programme and subsequently nominated for their 'Best of 2009' broadcast. The work featured musicians Chris Cundy Robert Perry, Evelyne Beech, Mike Cross with Wyer performing on guitar, piano and sound manipulation performing from a 'time-structured map' with stopwatches on music stands, allowing coherent movement from section to section.

Other works featuring Time Structured Mapping include the one-hour Listening to the Sky performed in the atrium of Birmingham Symphony Hall in 2010 by members of the Orchestra of the Swan along with components from local schools, according to directions given from the 'map'. The system was used by Welsh National Opera for the educational element of their 2010 tour. A 20-minute film, Beware Inanimate Objects (Bearing Grudges) was created by Gavin Porter, with a Wyer score for the first half of the film and a time-structured map for the second half, giving musical guidelines to groups of students in order for them to create the second half of the score in a one-day workshop.
