= Wendy Rose =

American poet (born 1948)

- Born: Bronwen Elizabeth Edwards; May 8, 1948 (age 78); Oakland, California, US
- Education: University of California, Berkeley (BA, MA, PhD)
- Occupations: Author, poet, scholar, professor
- Writing career
- Pen name: Chiron Khanshendel
- Notable work: Itch Like Crazy

Wendy Rose (born May 8, 1948) is an American writer. Having grown up in an environment which placed little emphasis on both her Native American and white background, much of her verse deals with her search for her personal identity. She is also an anthropologist, artist, and social scientist.

== Biography ==
Also known under her pseudonym Chiron Khanshendel, Wendy Rose is a poet, nonfiction writer, artist, educator, and anthropologist. As a blend of all of these things, Rose rejects marginalization and categorization, but she is best known for her work as an American Indian poet.

=== Early life ===
Wendy Rose was born Bronwen Elizabeth Edwards on May 7, 1948, in Oakland, California. She is of Hopi descent through her father and of partial Miwok descent through her mother.

She began making her own path as a young woman when she dropped out of high school to go to San Francisco and join the American Indian Movement (AIM) and took part in the protest occupation of Alcatraz. During this time, Rose spent time coming to terms with her ethnicity, gender, and an Indian's place in the world.

=== College years ===
From 1966 to 1980, she began a new scholastic endeavor where she was enrolled in multiple colleges. First she attended Cabrillo College and Contra Costa Junior College. Then in 1974, Rose enrolled at the University of California, Berkeley. While attending the university in 1976 she married Arthur Murata and earned her B.A. in anthropology in that same year. Two years later she got her M.A. in 1978 and enrolled in the doctoral program. During this period of her life, Rose published five volumes of poetry and completed her Ph.D. in anthropology.

=== Professional career ===
Besides the roles already mentioned of poet, historian, painter, illustrator, and anthropologist, Wendy Rose is also a teacher, researcher, consultant, editor, panelist, bibliographer, and advisor.

Once she had returned to her schooling, Rose did not leave the world of academia again and went on to teach Native American and Ethnic studies first at the University of California, Berkeley from 1979 to 1983, then California State University, Fresno from 1983 to 1984 and finally at her current position in Fresno City College in 1984 where she is the Coordinator of the American Indian Studies Program and edited the American Indian Quarterly. Rose is a member of the American Federation of Teachers and has served as a facilitator for the Association of Non-Federally Recognized California Tribes. In addition, she also serves on the Modern Languages Association Commission on Languages and Literatures of America, Smithsonian Native Writers' Series, Women's Literature Project of Oxford University Press, and Coordination Council of Literary Magazines.

== Themes ==
=== Major themes ===
Some of the major themes explored in Wendy Rose's works are themes relating to the Native American experience (both specifically her own and also more broadly applied to other cultures of marginalization): colonialism, imperialism, dependency, nostalgia for the old ways, reverence for grandparents, resentment for conditions of the present, plight of reservation and urban Indians, sense of hopelessness, the power of the trickster, feminism as synonymous with heritage, deadly compromise, symbolism of all that has been lost (such as land), tension between the desire to retrieve the past and the inevitability of change, arrogance of white people, problems of half-breeds (or mixed-bloods).

Of course there are other themes, many of which are related back to her life as an anthropologist. Though she commonly shies away from her career as an anthropologist, constantly stating that she isn't really one of them (as she does in "Neon Scars" and her piece on whiteshamanism), the reader is constantly reminded of her involvement in history and science through the poetry's imagery and historical epigraphs.

=== Whiteshamanism ===
While any of these could be discussed at length, one of the most prevalent themes Wendy Rose employs, which ties together many of the other more obscure themes, is the concept vividly expressed in the poem "For the White poets who would be Indian" (discussed below) known as "whiteshamanism."

Whiteshamanism is a term coined by the Cherokee critic, Geary Hobson, which he defined to be "the apparently growing number of small-press poets of generally white, Euro-Christian American background, who in their poems assume the persona of the shaman, usually in the guise of an American Indian medicine man. To be a poet is simply not enough; they must claim a power from higher sources."

Both Hobson and Rose see this whiteshamanism as a modern sort of cultural imperialism. In her discourse on whiteshamanism, "Just What's All This Fuss About Whiteshamanism Anyway?", Rose compares a white man with no real blood connection to Native Americans calling himself a shaman to a man claiming to be a Rabbi who isn't Jewish.

Native Americans view the whiteshaman with a mix of humor and contempt. It is not just the simple act of going outside their culture that is upsetting to Native Americans, but that they are misrepresenting the true Indian culture (their images are shadows of the true Indian style). Rose is opposed to the idea that through reading and hearing about Indian culture anyone can simply claim to be a spokesperson for the Native American experience.

As she puts it, "The problem with 'whiteshamans' is one of integrity and intent, not of topic, style, interest, or experimentation." Rose has no problem with other races writing about Native Americans and their history, so long as it is written from their perspective and not from a falsely manufactured "whiteshaman" persona who simply asserts that they have the authority to talk about and understand the Native American experience.

In the introduction of her retrospective collection Bone Dance (1994), she states that, "the personal is political." As scholar David Perron so eloquently puts it: "We come to understand that the diversity of Rose's poetry is not about distinctions, but about wholeness. Her contempt for the "whiteshaman" is out of the lack of wholeness which they represent, a wholeness which she has struggled to define in herself and her work. As she was struggling to find her identity within her mixed lineage and culture, using poetry to express herself, the "whiteshaman" simply stole from her culture. As her poetry bespeaks the position of injustice, the "whiteshaman" spoke from a privileged position. Thus, as difficult as it is to summarize the works of Wendy Rose, her writings on "whiteshamanism" bring together different strands of themes that appear throughout her poetry."

== Critical reception ==
=== Content ===
Wendy Rose has been one of the leading voices in resurgent Native American poetry for the past quarter of a century.

In an interview with Joseph Bruchac, she told him that she sees her task as "storykeeper" as she chronicles the sufferings of displaced peoples and biracial outcasts worldwide in addition to treating ecological and feminist issues.

Wendy Rose's work is deeply rooted in ethnography and the living myths of Indian peoples. Noted for verse detailing her search for tribal and personal identity, much of Rose's poetry examines the experiences of mixed-blood Native Americans estranged from both native and white societies. This stems from her own mixed heritage and search for identity. Rose herself has said, "Everything I write is fundamentally autobiographical, no mater what style or topic." Yet unlike many current and conventional white poets, her poems go beyond self-analysis to focus on others caught between cultures like herself.

At the same time, diversity is also apparent and expressed through multiple perspectives and covering a broad range of universally human experiences.

In her introduction to Bone Dance, she tells us, "I have often been identified as a 'protest poet,' and although something in me frowns at being so neatly categorized, that is largely the truth." A huge element of her poetry is political, which is also unsurprising knowing her involvement in AIM and other Native American movements. As she puts it, "because the political is personal" it becomes a part of the poetry, whether intentionally so or not.

Knowing her background in anthropology and various Native American organizations, it is not surprising that the most prevalent image in her poetry are bones. In her poetry, the image of battered bone is the direct link to native American sense of self. The bones of dead Indians almost form the words on the page and are the spine holding together each of her volumes of poetry. Stemming from her work with anthropology, she writes about bones auctioned, objects sold, and bodies stuffed for our edification in a museum display. Those dead Indians both form the phantoms that haunt her poetry and at the same time are given new life and the chance to speak out in her poetry.

== Works ==
=== Introduction ===
Each of Wendy Rose's collections of poetry represent a different phase in her life and a different set of experiences and can be linked to different points in her life which influenced each volume in a unique way.

=== Selected bibliography ===
- Itch Like Crazy (2002) – this work deals with buried secrets of personal, family, and American history in relation to the human experience.
- Bone Dance: New and Selected Poems, 1965–1992 (1994) – a collection of some of her works from all of her different collections focusing on the condition of the "halfbreed."
- Now Poof She Is Gone (1994) – a collection of more of her private and personal poems with a common theme of feminine identity.
- Going to War With All My Relations (1993) – this volume documents her thirty-some years of activities with the Fourth World Movement.
- The Halfbreed Chronicles & Other Poems (1985)—this volume mixes the pain of marginalization with the desire for wholeness in her stories of oppression mixed with beauty.
- What Happened When the Hopi Hit New York (1982) – this volume is her search for tribal and personal history in a modern and foreign world.
- Lost Copper (1980) – the central focus is on Roses' feelings of marginalization and her desire to be part of the native community and blended identity.
- Aboriginal Tattooing in California (1979)
- Builder Kachina: A Home-Going Cycle (1979) – a journey from her mother's land to her father's in search of tribal identity.
- Academic Squaw: Reports to the World from the Ivory Tower (1977) – her ironic title reflects on the (un)reality of her experience as an American Indian in the white university system (as well as which beginning a theme of scholar and subject).
- Long Division: A Tribal History (1976)
- Hopi Roadrunner Dancing (1973) – her first major work deals with issues which arose with her involvement in AIM as well as personal struggles with cultural identity.

=== Other works ===
- Just What's All This Fuss about Whiteshamanism, Anyway? Coyote Was Here (1984)
- Neon Scars, I Tell You Now (1987)
- The Great Pretenders: Further Reflections on Whiteshamanism, The State of Native America: Genocide, Colonization and Resistance (1992)
- For Some It's a Time of Mourning, Without Discovery (1992)

== See also ==
- List of writers from peoples Indigenous to the Americas
- Native American Studies

== Sources ==
- "American Poets of the 20th Century: Wendy Rose", URL accessed 04/17/08
- Furlong-Bolliger, Susan. "Wendy Rose." Guide to Literary Masters and Their Works. 17 April 2008
- Hamilton, Amy T. "Remembering Migration and Removal, American Indian Women's Poetry." Rocky Mountain Review of Language and Literature. 61 (2007): 9 pars. 17 April 2008.
- Hunter, Carol. "A MELUS Interview: Wendy Rose." MELUS. 10 (1983) 17 April 2008. doi:10.2307/467443
- Marek, Jayne. "Rose, Wendy." Continuum Encyclopedia of American Literature, Letter R. (1948): 2/3 pars. 17 April 2008.
- "Modern American Poetry: Wendy Rose ", URL accessed 04/17/08
- "Native American Authors Project, Wendy Rose, 1948–", URL accessed 07/25/07
- Rose, Wendy (Autumn 1981). "Six poems: Wendy Rose". Frontiers: A Journal of Women Studies. 6 (3). University of Nebraska Press: 20–23. doi:10.2307/3346204. JSTOR 3346204.
- Saucerman, James R. "Wendy Rose: Searching Through Shards, Creating Life" Wíčazo Ša Review. 5 (1989) 17 April 2008. doi:10.2307/1409401
- Sawhney, Brajesh. "That the People Might Live: Strategies of Survival in Contemporary Native American Fiction." ICFAI Journal of English Studies. 3 (2008) 17 April 2008.
- "VG: Artist Biography: Rose, Wendy", URL accessed 04/17/08
- "Wendy Rose Criticism", URL accessed 04/17/08
