= Susan Scutti =

American poet

Susan Scutti is an American fiction writer, poet and journalist currently writing on medical issues for Newsweek, CNN CBS Philly and Medical Daily.

Scutti obtained her undergraduate degree from Yale University She then went on to earn a master's degree in American studies from CUNY. As a poet she has published a volume of verse The Commute (Paper Kite Press 2011 ISBN 0-9831606-0-0) and had her poems included in several anthologies, such as Aloud: Voices from the Nuyorican Poets Café (Holt Paperbacks 1994). and The Outlaw Bible of American Poetry (Thunder's Mouth Press 1999), among others.

As a writer of fiction she has published a book of short stories; The Renaissance Began with a Muted Shade of Green (Linear Arts 1999- ISBN 1-891219-65-0)) and three novels, beginning with A kind of Sleep in 2004 (ISBN 0595335993), Second Generation in (ISBN 0595268803) in 2008, both independently, and The Deceptive Smiles of Bredmeyer Deed (2011– available as a digital download from Raven Rock Press). A core member of the rag tag literary collective "the Unbearables", Scutti has works in several of their collections.
