= Katherine Arnoldi =

American writer and graphic novelist

- Born: 1951 (age 74–75); Canton, Ohio
- Citizenship: United States
- Occupations: Writer; Graphic novelist
- Website: Official website

Katherine Arnoldi (born 1951 in Canton, Ohio) is an American writer and graphic novelist. Arnoldi is perhaps best known for her graphic novel, The Amazing “True” Story of a Teenage Single Mom (Hyperion: 1998). In 1999, "The Amazing “True” Story of a Teenage Single Mom was cited as a top book of the year by the Young Adult Library Services Association of the American Library Association. According to WorldCat, the book is held in 452 libraries.

Arnoldi's 2007 collection of stories All Things Are Labor won the Juniper prize and was then published by the University of Massachusetts Press in the series of such honored works therein. She has also been a recipient of the Hensfield Transatlantic fiction award, a Jerome Lowell DeJur award in fiction from the City College of New York and two New York Foundation for the Arts awards. In 2008–2009, she was a Fulbright scholar in Paraguay. She has been a fellow at the Blue Mountain Center and the MacDowell Colony. Currently, Arnoldi is an adjunct professor at the John Jay College of Criminal Justice in New York City.
