= Bart Plantenga =

Dutch academic and writer

- Born: Amsterdam, Netherlands
- Education: University of Michigan
- Known for: Research on yodeling
- Website: bartplantenga.weebly.com

Bart Plantenga is a writer who has been called "the world's expert on yodeling" and the "Alan Lomax of not just the yodeling world but yodeling worldwide." He is also a pirate radio station disc jockey known for his radio show on Radio Patapoe, "Wreck this Mess."

== Career ==
Plantenga has written several books about yodeling including Yodel-Ay-Ee-Oooo: The Secret History of Yodeling Around the World, released in 2004 by Routledge, and Yodel in Hi-Fi: From Kitsch Folk to Contemporary Electronica, released in 2013 by the University of Wisconsin Press.

He has also released the album The Rough Guide to Yodel and wrote the entry on yodeling in Music Around the World: A Global Encyclopedia.

Along with Ron Kolm, Mike Golden, and Peter Lamborn Wilson, he was a co-founder of the Unbearables, a literary group in New York City, which held an annual event reading erotic poetry aloud on the Brooklyn Bridge, and stormed the offices of The New Yorker "to protest the quality of the magazine’s poetry."

Plantenga maintains two YouTube channels, Yodel in HiFi Top 50+, and a channel for his radio show, Wreck Dub Wire Yodel, and has written for The Brooklyn Rail.

His novel Beer Mystic has been called an "experiential experiment" and a "'global pub crawl' across various Web sites" and is excerpted in the critical anthology Up Is Up, But So Is Down New York's Downtown Literary Scene, 1974-1992.

== Personal life ==
Plantenga is a native of Amsterdam. He spent a year at the University of Wisconsin, Madison, as a student in the early 1970s before transferring to the University of Michigan for his degree. He lives in Amsterdam with his partner Nina Ascoly and their daughter Paloma.

== Selected works ==
- Plantenga, Bart (1994). Wiggling wishbone: stories of pata-sexual speculation. Brooklyn, N.Y.: Autonomedia. ISBN 1570270090.
- Plantenga, Bart (2004). Yodel-ay-ee-oooo: the secret history of yodeling around the world. New York: Routledge. ISBN 0415939895.
- Plantenga, Bart (2004). Spermatogonia: the Isle of Man. Brooklyn, NY: Autonomedia. ISBN 1570271607.
- "Beer Mystic, A Novel of Beer & Light". Hosted on 40 websites.
- Plantenga, Bart (2012). Yodel in hi-fi: from kitsch folk to contemporary electronica. Madison, Wis: University of Wisconsin Press. ISBN 9780299290542.
- NY Sin Phoney in Face Flat Minor (2012) (ebook)
- Paris Scratch (2012) (ebook)
- Plantenga, Bart. "Encounters with Ginz: Fame and Terror, Beauty and Protest, Power and Pleading". Archived from the original on 2014-05-25.
