= Michael Carter (poet) =

American poet and publisher

Michael Carter is an American poet and publisher, known for having produced Redtape Magazine between 1980 and 1992.

He was both the publisher and editor of Redtape, an East Village zine which existed between 1980 and 1992. The magazine communicated innovative artistic ideas and divided its pages between literature and graphics. Redtape encouraged the collaboration of writers and visual artists. Of the publication Carter once stated that the purpose of the magazine was "to explore new possibilities and forms of expression, to develop craft and technique without becoming sequestered in an intellectual or academic ivory tower." Redtape featured comics, fiction, poetry, graphic art, and photography. It also provided a venue for both established and emerging artists and writers of the downtown New York scene.

Carter is the author of two books of poems; Broken Noses and Metempsychoses (Fly By Night Press, 1996) and On Bolus Head (Cill Rialaig/En Garde Books, 2012) — poems and prints in collaboration with artist Brian Gormley. He had previously been an artist-in-residence at the Cill Rialaig Artist Retreat in County Kerry, Ireland.

Carter is interviewed on screen in the 2017 documentary film Shadowman on the late 1980s East Village graffiti artist, Richard Hambleton.
