= FusionArts Museums =

Art galleries

Coordinates: 40°43′18.65″N 73°59′25.08″W

FusionArts Museum
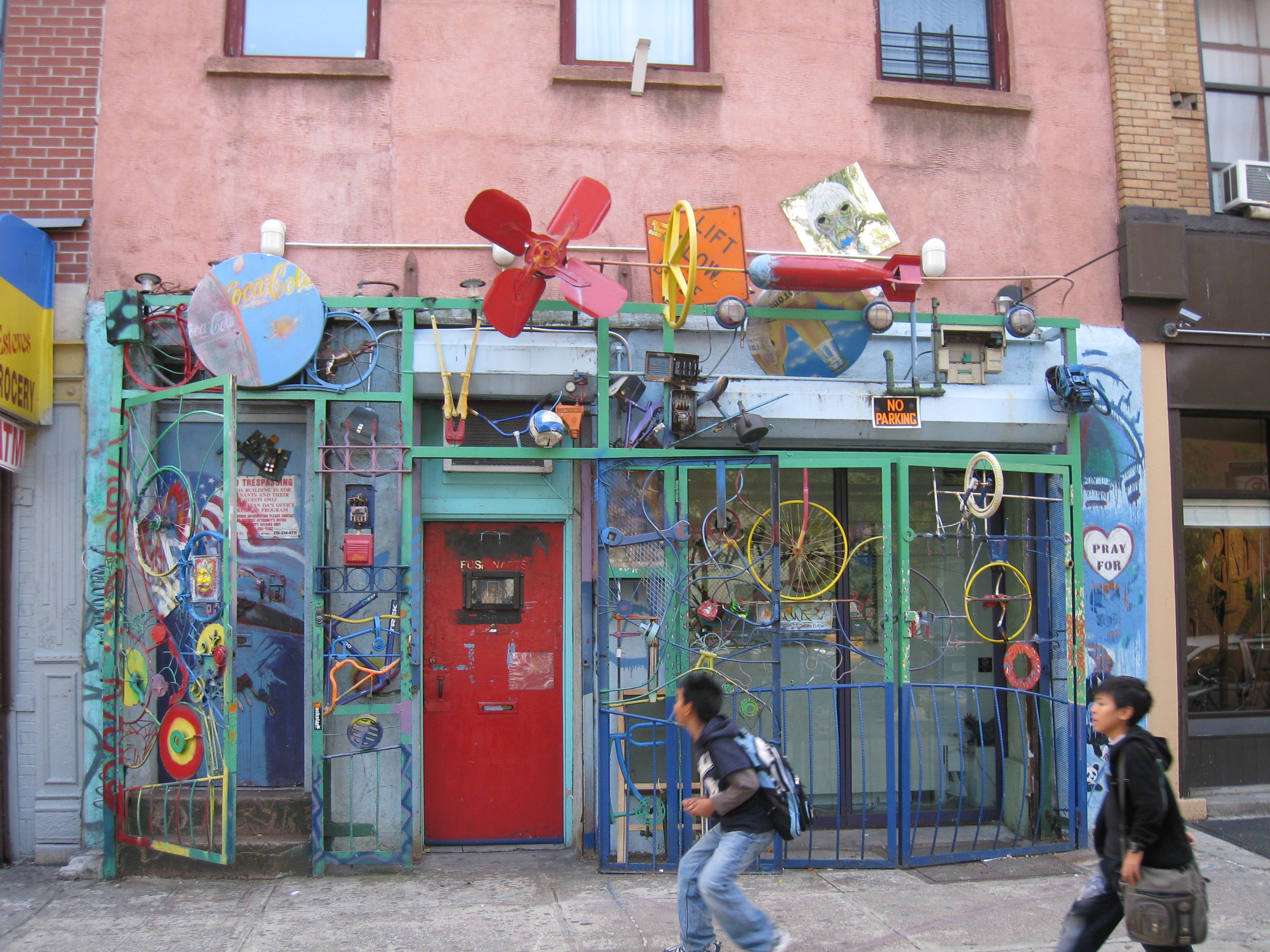
- Location: Manhattan, New York, United States; Prague, Czech Republic; Easton, Pennsylvania, United States
- Director: Deborah Fries

FusionArts Museum(s), first founded at 57 Stanton Street on Manhattan's Lower East Side are a series of curated exhibition spaces dedicated to the exhibition and archiving of "fusion art". The museum was and remains at its successive locations a not-for-profit gallery operated by Converging Arts Media Organization, a not-for-profit arts organization that promotes emerging American and international fusion artists. Though the initial space in Manhattan was converted into a commercial art gallery in 2012 and is currently not operating as a Fusionarts museum, other spaces in Prague, Czech Republic and Easton, Pennsylvania area.

== Description ==
The museums are dedicated to promoting fusion art, which they believe to mirror life in the 21st century. Fusion art expands from its roots in conventional art disciplines. The New York City museum succeeded in the changing and evolving neighborhood in which it was based. Fusion art typically requires more work to display than traditional art, which is why many galleries do not display fusion work.

== Founder ==
The museum was founded by Shalom Neuman, a Czech-born American "multisensory" multimedia artist. His family emigrated to Israel when he was a young child, then to Pittsburgh, Pennsylvania, when he was 12. Neuman has taught at a number of universities in New York City including Cooper Union, Parsons School of Design, and the Pratt Institute, where he is currently a lecturer. He exhibited his work at the museum while the space was occupied by the titular institution which has since moved to spaces in Prague, Czech Republic, and Easton, Pennsylvania, and he continues to exhibit at the subsequent locations. In 2015 Neuman was a recipient of a Premio Galileo award in art.
