= Max Blagg =

British poet

Max Blagg is a British poet, writer, and performer. Blagg has performed in New York City since 1973. He is a visiting lecturer in poetry at The New School in New York City (continuous from 2005).

== Life ==
Max Blagg was born in 1948 at Retford, England, where he was a childhood friend of the actor Philip Jackson. Both were educated at Retford King Edward VI Grammar School and were together in the same class from 1959 until 1966. At the end of his second year he was elevated to the junior fourth form as one of the top 18 of the 78 students in that year. In 1965 he was appointed as a school prefect. He left school with GCE A levels in English and French, and was later accepted by London's North Western Polytechnic (which later became part of London Metropolitan University, now the University of North London). He received a Bachelor of Arts Lit. [partial] degree.

Blagg states he moved to New York City in 1973, although on other occasions gives the date as 1971. or 1972.

In 1992, his poem "What Fits?" was the soundtrack to a commercial for Gap jeans.

== Works ==
The venues where Blagg has performed include the Kitchen, Guggenheim Museum, Jackie 60, Cable gallery, Nuyorican's Poet's café, St Mark's Church, Bowery Poetry Club, CBGB, Sybarite, KGB Bar, Performing Garage and Mudd Club.

=== Magazines ===
- Bomb
- Shiny
- Lacanian Ink
- Interview
- Village Voice
- Night
- Verbal Abuse
- Bald Ego
- Open City
- Black Book
- Room 101
- The East Hampton Star
- Sensitive Skin Magazine

=== Newspapers ===
- New York Times, "I Am The Chelsea Hotel". April 30, 2006

=== Books ===
- From Here to Maternity (Disco Version) Aloes Books/Hotel Firbank, 1980
- From Here to Maternity - Aloes Books London 1982
- Monkey - Appearances 18 (special issue) 1991
- Licking the Fun Up - Aloes Books London 1991
- Pink Instrument - Lumen Boston 1998
- Eat a Peach - (privately printed) 2006
- Up is Up and So is Down NYC Writing and Art from the 80's. edited by Brandon Stosuy, New York Press, 2006
- What Love Sees in the Distance - Open City Books 2008
- Ticket Out (2013)

=== Film Appearances ===
- "Total Recall" June 11, 2007
