= Barbara Luderowski =

American artist and museum administrator (1930–2018)

Barbara Luderowski (January 26, 1930 – May 30, 2018) was an American artist and museum administrator, who founded the Mattress Factory in Pittsburgh, Pennsylvania and served as the museum's president and co-director.

With her ten-year-old daughter, Luderowski moved to Pittsburgh from Birmingham, Michigan around 1972, and decided to buy a condemned home after taking a tour of the city's North Side. In 1975 she purchased an empty six-story factory in the Central Northside, where mattresses had been manufactured at the turn of the 20th century. She immediately moved in, and from the beginning envisioned the building as a place where she could work on her own sculpture while sharing studio space and conversation with other artists. Luderowski founded the namesake Mattress Factory museum in 1977, dedicating it to site-specific installation art, much of it by artists in residence. Although Mattress Factory installations change regularly, with some 650 different artists showing installation and performance pieces over its nearly 40-year history, permanent exhibits include important works by Yayoi Kusama and Greer Lankton, as well as three installations by James Turrell.

Luderowski owned several properties around the Mattress Factory, which she donated to both local and internationally-known artists and curators for projects. She lived (with museum co-director Michael Olijnyk, also an artist) in a two-story loft-like apartment at the top of the original Mattress Factory building.
