= Noj Barker =

British art dealer

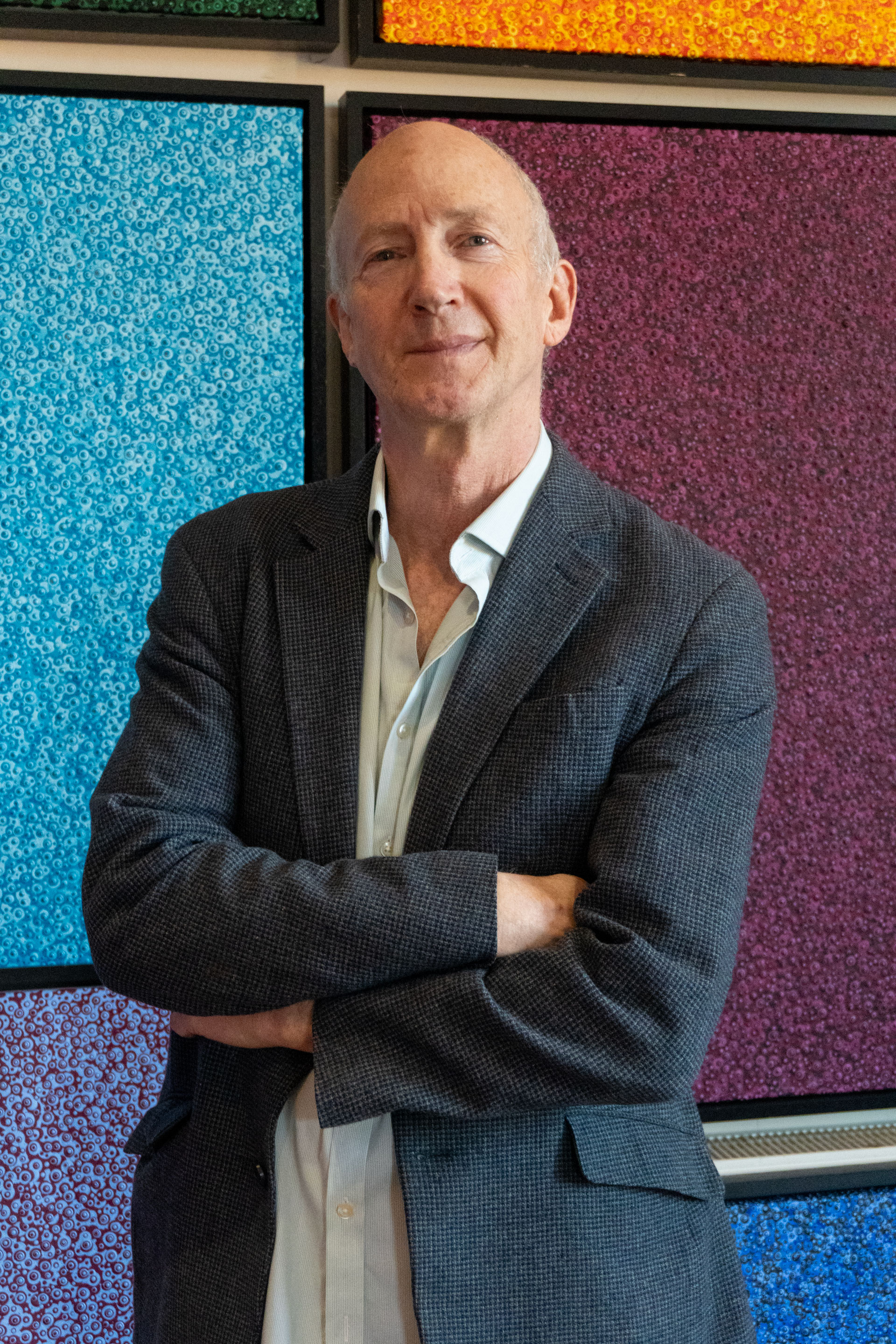
- Noj Barker, artist
- Born: 30 April 1960 (age 66); Hertfordshire, England, UK

Noj Barker is a British artist. Entirely self-taught, he began painting 2007 and since then has exhibited in America, Dubai and the U.K, including a solo presentation at the Saatchi Gallery, along with exhibitions at Heathrow and Gatwick airports,as well as in high profile London restaurants and clubs.

== Artistic practice ==
Executed in both color and monochrome, his signature ‘dot paintings’ feature overlapping patterns created by intersecting arrays of dots.

Drawing on a variety of influences, amongst them the Japanese artist Yayoi Kusama, his creative process is noted for its obsessive and meticulous nature, with his large-scale paintings sometimes taking up six months to complete.

== Biography ==
On leaving school, he studied dance at the London Studio Centre (1979-1980) and Rambert Ballet School (1980-1983). going on to work as a professional dancer, touring in Italy and Japan between 1983 and 1986, before embarking on his career as an artist He currently lives in Northamptonshire with his wife and four children.
