= Mattress Factory =

Contemporary art museum in Pittsburgh, Pennsylvania

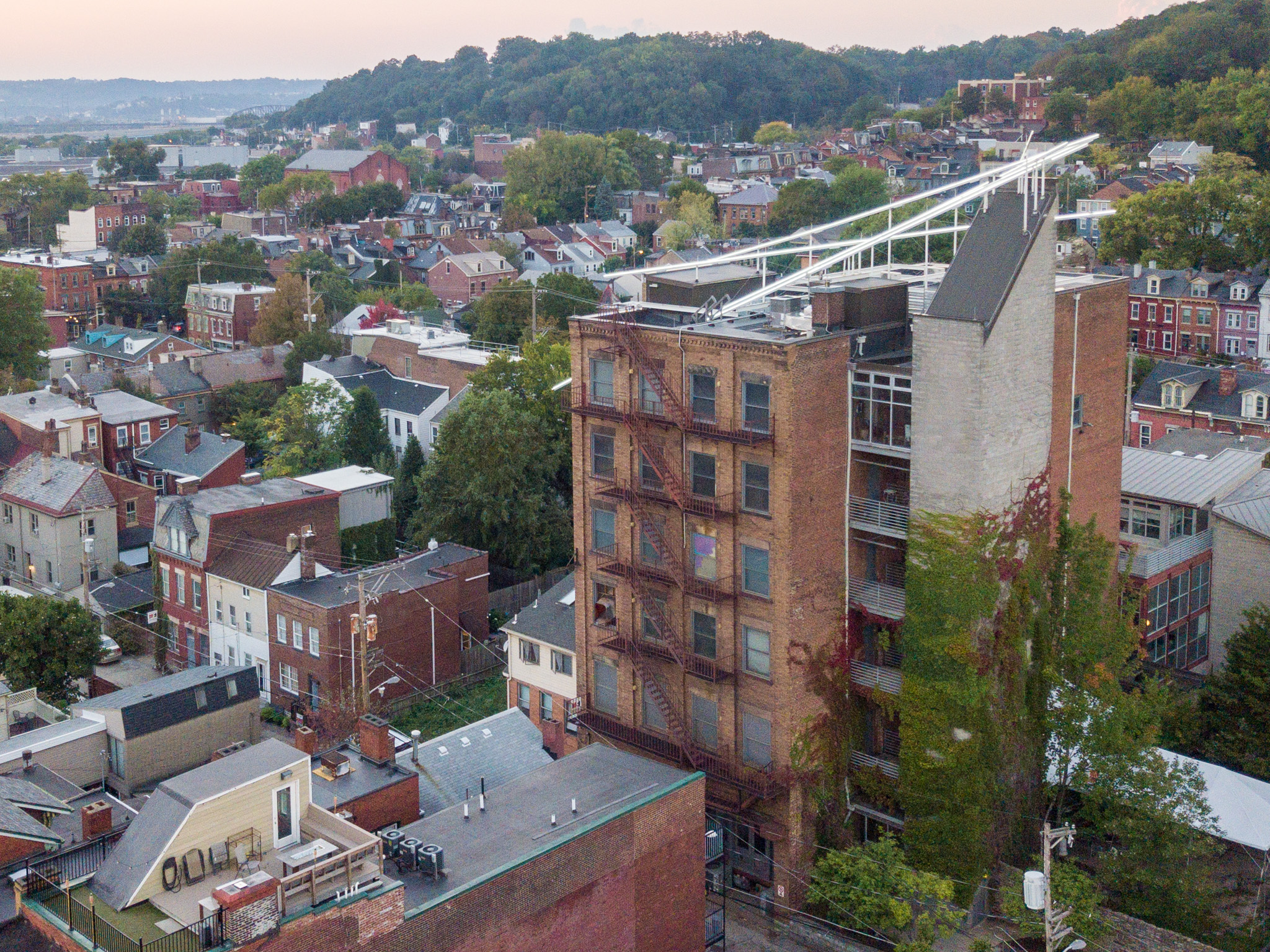
- The Mattress Factory

- Location of the Mattress Factory in Pittsburgh
- Established: 1977
- Location: Pittsburgh, Pennsylvania
- Coordinates: 40.4571477°N 80.012187°W
- Type: Contemporary art museum with a focus on site-specific installation art.
- Visitors: 40,000+ (2026)
- Founder: Barbara Luderowski
- Director: David Oresick
- Parking: On site, Street, no charge
- Website: mattress.org

The Mattress Factory is a contemporary art museum located in Pittsburgh, Pennsylvania. It was a pioneer of site-specific installation art and features permanent installations by artists Yayoi Kusama, James Turrell, and Greer Lankton. The museum's roof itself is a light art installation and part of Pittsburgh's Northside evening skyline.

Barbara Luderowski purchased a derelict Stearns & Foster mattress warehouse in 1975. The museum achieved non-profit status in 1977. Over the next forty years, Luderowski would attract upcoming installation artists to fill its rooms. The Mattress Factory along with its neighbors City of Asylum and Randyland are credited with playing a role in Pittsburgh's revitalization.

== History ==
In 1975, artist and Mattress Factory founder Barbara Luderowski purchased a former Stearns & Foster mattress warehouse at 500 Sampsonia Way in Pittsburgh's Central Northside. Originally, she used the warehouse as a space to live, work and build a community of artists and intellectuals. The community grew and in 1977—after two years of hosting art exhibits and a small food co-op—the Mattress Factory was established as a legal non-profit educational and cultural corporation. Its first exhibition of installation art opened five years later on May 8, 1982, and the museum has since grown to be an integral part of the Pittsburgh arts community, known for its artist residency program, educational programming, and unique exhibitions. In 2008 then-Curator of Exhibitions Michael Olijnyk joined Luderowski in leading the museum as co-director.

Over the years the Mattress Factory has acquired more properties for various purposes, including:

- 1414 Monterey Street, which became a new gallery space
- Two buildings on North Taylor Street that became artist residences
- 505 Jacksonia Street, which is now used as a parking lot for museum visitors, and the adjacent lot, which now houses Winifred Lutz's Garden Installation, 1993
- 516 Sampsonia Way, which opened as gallery space in Fall 2013

=== Sexual Misconduct Allegations ===
In September 2018, a report published in Pittsburgh's WESA detailed five employees' allegations of sexual misconduct and the mishandling of the situation by the Mattress Factory and its director, Michael Olijnyk. The complaint was filed with the National Labor Relations Board, and in early January 2019, a settlement was reached and the investigation was closed.

== Long-term exhibitions ==
As of 2024, the Mattress Factory hosts 20 long-term installations. The following is a list:

Name	Artist	Year
Handrail	A Collaboration	1993
Danaë	James Turrell	1983
Pleiades	James Turrell	1983
Ship of Fools: Discovery of Time	Bill Woodrow	1986
Untitled	Jene Highstein	1986
Bed Sitting Rooms for an Artist in Residence	Allan Wexler	1988
Trespass	William Anastasi	1991
Catso, Red	James Turrell	1994
Untitled (Calisthenic Series)	William Anastasi	1997
Music for a Garden	Rolf Julius	1996
Ash	Rolf Julius	1991
Red	Rolf Julius	1996
Acupuncture	Hans Peter Kuhn	2016
Repetitive Vision	Yayoi Kusama	1996
Infinity Dots Mirrored Room	Yayoi Kusama	1996
It's All About ME, Not You	Greer Lankton	1996
Garden	Winifred Lutz	1997
610-3356	Sarah Oppenheimer	2008
Unbrella	Vanessa Sica & Chris Kasabach	2009
Ground	Dove Bradshaw	1994

== Gallery ==
Repetitive Vision installation by Yayoi Kusama

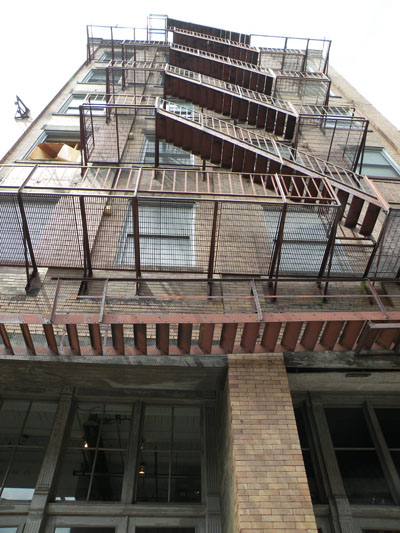
Mattress Factory building

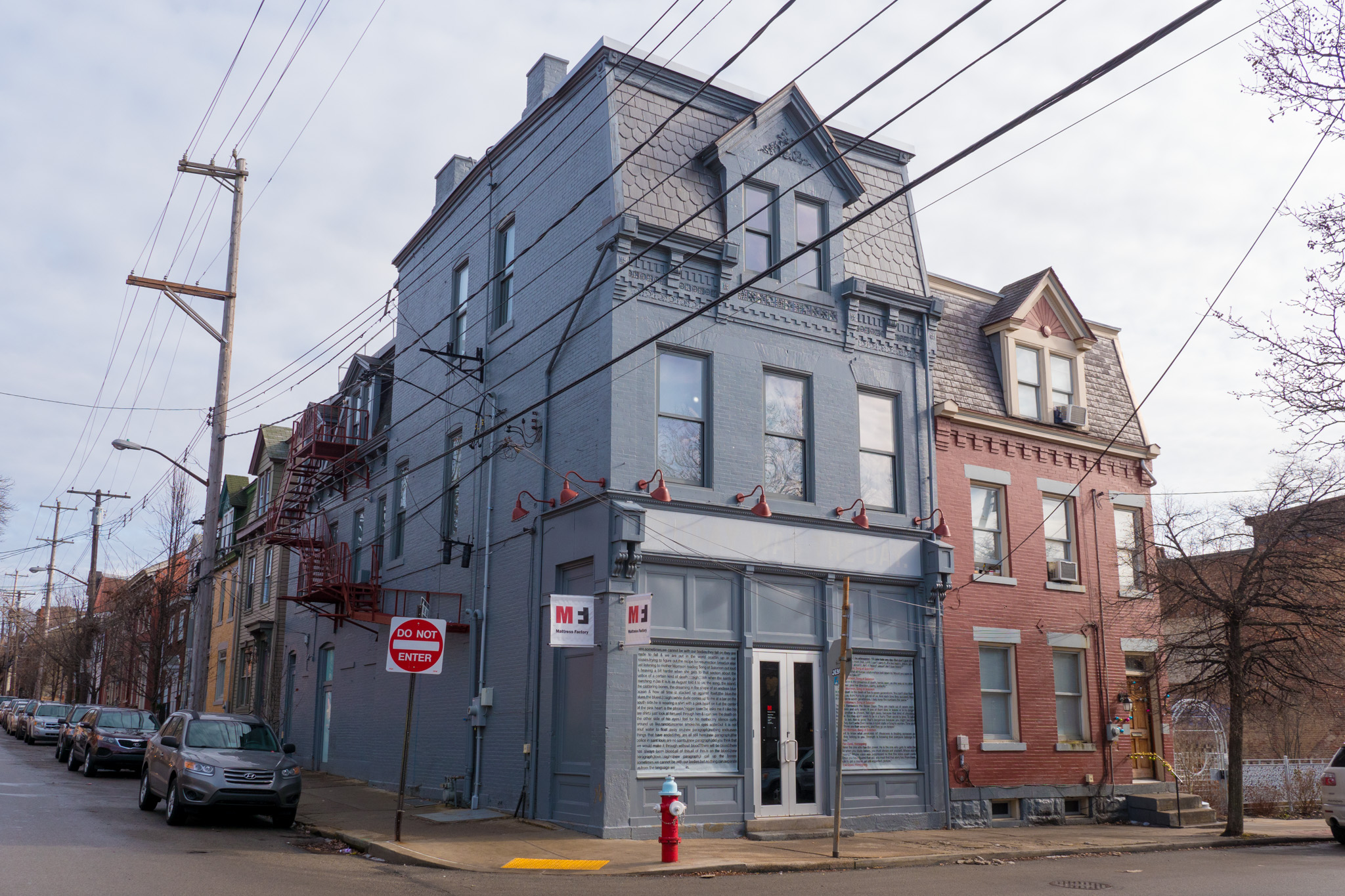
The Mattress Factory Annex Gallery

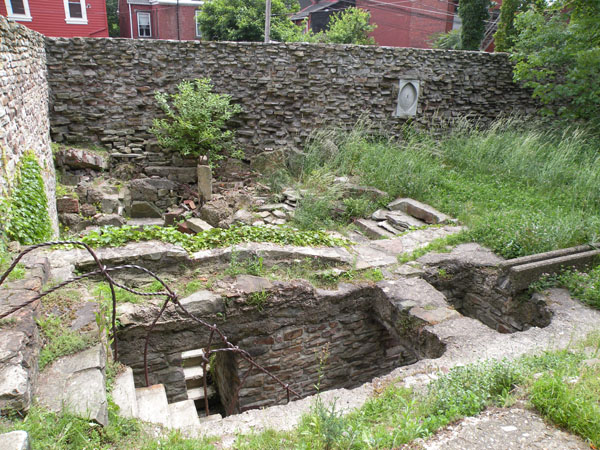
Garden Installation by Winifred Lutz
