= Greer Lankton =

American artist

- Greer Lankton with some of her dolls
- Born: April 21, 1958; Flint, Michigan, U.S.
- Died: November 18, 1996 (aged 38); Chicago, Illinois, U.S.
- Occupation: American artist

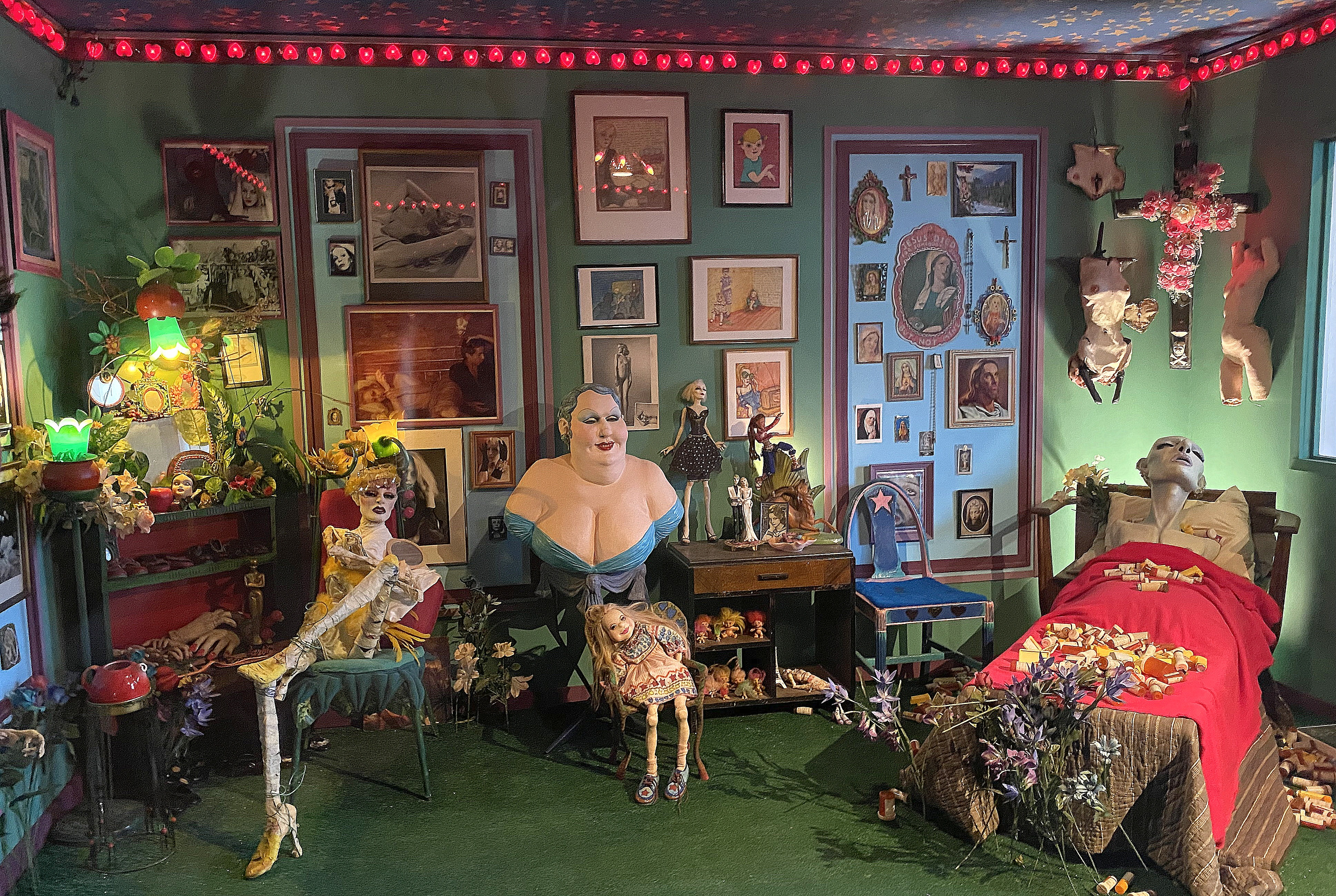
It's All About Me, Not You, 1996 Greer Lankton, the Mattress Factory, Pittsburgh, PA

Greer Lankton (April 21, 1958 – November 18, 1996), was an American transgender artist known for creating lifelike sewn dolls that were often modeled on friends or celebrities and posed in elaborate theatrical settings. She was a key figure in the East Village art scene of the 1980s in Downtown New York City.

== Early life ==
Greer Lankton was born in Flint, Michigan, to a Presbyterian minister and his wife. It was during her rough childhood as a "feminine boy" that she began creating dolls. "It was when I was about ten years old ... I used to make dolls out of hollyhocks and all types of flowers. Pipe cleaner dolls and things like that. I started taking it seriously by the time I went to college when I was 17." Lankton was often teased by peers, and on more than one occasion experienced physical harassment.

Lankton studied at the Art Institute of Chicago and later studied sculpture at the Pratt Institute in New York. She changed her name and had gender affirmation surgery at the age of 21, while she was a student at Pratt. Lankton's father Bill convinced the church's board to cover Greer's surgery under the church's health insurance. She had previously been the subject of a local newspaper article about people transitioning to a new gender.

== Work ==
Lankton said in interviews that the surgery "made me focus on bodies. I was always thinking about bodies, and if you think you have the wrong body, you're always going to think about it."

Gender and sexuality are recurring themes in Lankton's art. Her dolls are created in the likeness of those society calls "freaks", and have often been compared to the surrealist works of Hans Bellmer, who made surreal dolls with interchangeable limbs. Greer also credits the work of Jean Genet, William S. Burroughs, Patti Smith, and late 19th century Symbolists and Decadents among her creative influences. She created figures that were simultaneously distressing and glamorous, as if they were both victim and perpetrator of their existence.

Lankton also explored her feelings around her body, sexuality, and gender through her work. In an interview when Lankton was asked if most of her work was self-referential, she responded "I think all of it. My first show all had to do with references to the sex change." According to Lankton's lifelong friend Nan Goldin, "More instinctive than cerebral, more physical and visual than verbal, her work was her form of communication...There was absolutely no distance between her life and her work, something that is said about many artists but was especially true about Greer. She was her own doll -- starving herself, transforming herself, abusing herself."

Lankton's dolls were frequently life-size, ranging from 6" to 7' in height. She would create the dolls by first making joints out of coat hangers or skeletons of old umbrellas to move like actual human joints. Then she would cover them in tissue paper and matte medium that got painted over. Her dolls were detailed and life-like. Greer enjoyed playing with her dolls as she made them and would have friends over to play with them as well.

In 1981, Lankton was featured in the seminal "New York/New Wave" exhibition at P.S.1 in Long Island City and began to show her work in the East Village at Civilian Warfare, where she had solo shows in 1983, 1984, and 1985. She gained an almost cult following among East Village residents from her highly theatrical window displays she designed for Einstein's, the boutique run by her husband, Paul Monroe, at 96 East Seventh Street.

Besides her more emotionally charged dolls, Lankton also created commissioned portrait dolls. These include a 1989 doll of Diana Vreeland that was commissioned for a window display at Barney's as well as shrines to her icons, such as Candy Darling.

Critic Roberta Smith described her works in the New York Times as: "Beautifully sewn, with extravagant clothes, make-up and hairstyles, they were at once glamorous and grotesque and exuded intense, Expressionistic personalities that reminded some observers of Egon Schiele. They presaged many of the concerns of '90s art, including the emphasis on the body, sexuality, fashion and, in their resemblance to puppets, performance."

Photographer Nan Goldin said "Greer was one of the pioneers who blurred the line between folk art and fine art." She appeared in Goldin's 1995 film "I'll Be Your Mirror." She also had work in the prestigious Whitney Biennial and the Venice Biennale, both in 1995, where her busts of Candy Darling, circus fat ladies, and severed heads gained her notoriety. In the winter of 1996, her work was featured in "Heterogenous" at the Catherine Nash Gallery in Minneapolis, which at the time was billed as the largest show ever, in the Midwest, of works of LGBTQ artists.

Lankton's final and largest work from 1996, titled It's All About Me, Not You, is a permanent installation at the Mattress Factory in Pittsburgh. The work is a replica of her apartment and features autobiographical drawings, dolls, plastic flowers, a religious shrine, and photographs of Greer.

In November 2014, "LOVE ME," a major exhibition of Lankton's work including more than 90 dolls, documentation, and ephemera was mounted at PARTICIPANT, INC in New York City. It was organized by Lia Gangitano in cooperation with the Greer Lankton Archives Museum (G.L.A.M.), which was founded by Paul Monroe after Lankton's death.

An early journal of Lankton's, Sketchbook, September 1977, was published in September 2023 by Primary Information. Written while she was an art student at the Art Institute of Chicago, the journal features drawings, diagrams, and writing. The poet Kay Gabriel writes for Artforum, "One page diagrams her life; a line stretches to a node titled “creation,” under which three more lines lead to “Dancing,” “Dollmaking,” and “cross-sex.” These nodes stand in contrast with the others on the page: “self torture,” “Mother,” and “Speeding up life to get it over with.” It’s an endearing moment of reflection from a young woman at a pivotal moment—pre-notoriety, weighing a sex change. Artmaking and transition appear as related but distinct activities, nonidentical and catalytic of each other, as if pursuing one might hasten the other." For Document Journal, the writer Journey Streams contextualized the book in relation to work by American trans women of the 1970s onwards: "Lankton’s words are both a preamble to and an echo of a tradition of subcultural, trans-related printed matter that circulated from the late-’70s into the early-aughts. The TV/TS Tapestry Newsletter published literature on self-presentation, fashion, and the trans experience as early as 1979. A Canadian DIY zine titled gendertrash from hell crafted seasonal editions from 1993 to 1995, featuring writing by and for trans people; Lankton’s testimonies share the tone of the 24 “GENDER MYTHS” published in its Fall ’93 issue."

Elsewhere, the writer and model Alaska Riley shares, "I’ve said often that transness is a testament to intuition. Led by a profound understanding that our bodies are malleable in nature, we claim agency by assuming the task of evolution. When hearing of Greer Lankton and her work, I was intrigued by the archival documentation of seemingly autobiographical experiences through the crafting of hand-sewn dolls. I saw much of myself in many of them, now with a greater insight into the inspirations of their creator herself. There was an acceptance of her own evolution of body and mind, even if never finished nor always at the same pace. “I will not die, I will become.”"

== Publications ==
- Lankton, Greer. Sketchbook: September 1977. Primary Information, 2023.

== Personal life ==
Lankton began studying at the Pratt Institute in New York City in 1978. Lankton was friends with photographer Nan Goldin and lived in Goldin's apartment in the early 1980s, often posing for her. She was featured as the subject of a photo-essay in Nan Goldin's book, The Other Side. She also played muse to photographers including David Wojnarowicz and Peter Hujar.

Lankton married designer Paul Monroe in 1987 in New York City. After a brief and abusive marriage, Lankton divorced Monroe. Greer Lankton’s close friend, Nan Goldin, was her wedding photographer.

In 1986 Greer opened up her own gallery THE DOLL CLUB in EINSTEINS. Lankton's window installations at Einstein's put the store on the map, but the store closed in 1992.

In 1991, Greer moved back to Chicago and went into a detoxification clinic. Lankton continued to struggle with drug addiction and anorexia for many years. She died on November 18, 1996, of a drug overdose in her Chicago apartment, just a month after completing her final and largest work. Titled It's All About Me, Not You, this last work has become a permanent installation at the Mattress Factory in Pittsburgh.

== Mentor of Jojo Baby ==
Lankton was the known mentor of Chicago artist Jojo Baby in regards to doll making.
