= Yayoi Kusama Museum =

Art museum in Tokyo, Japan

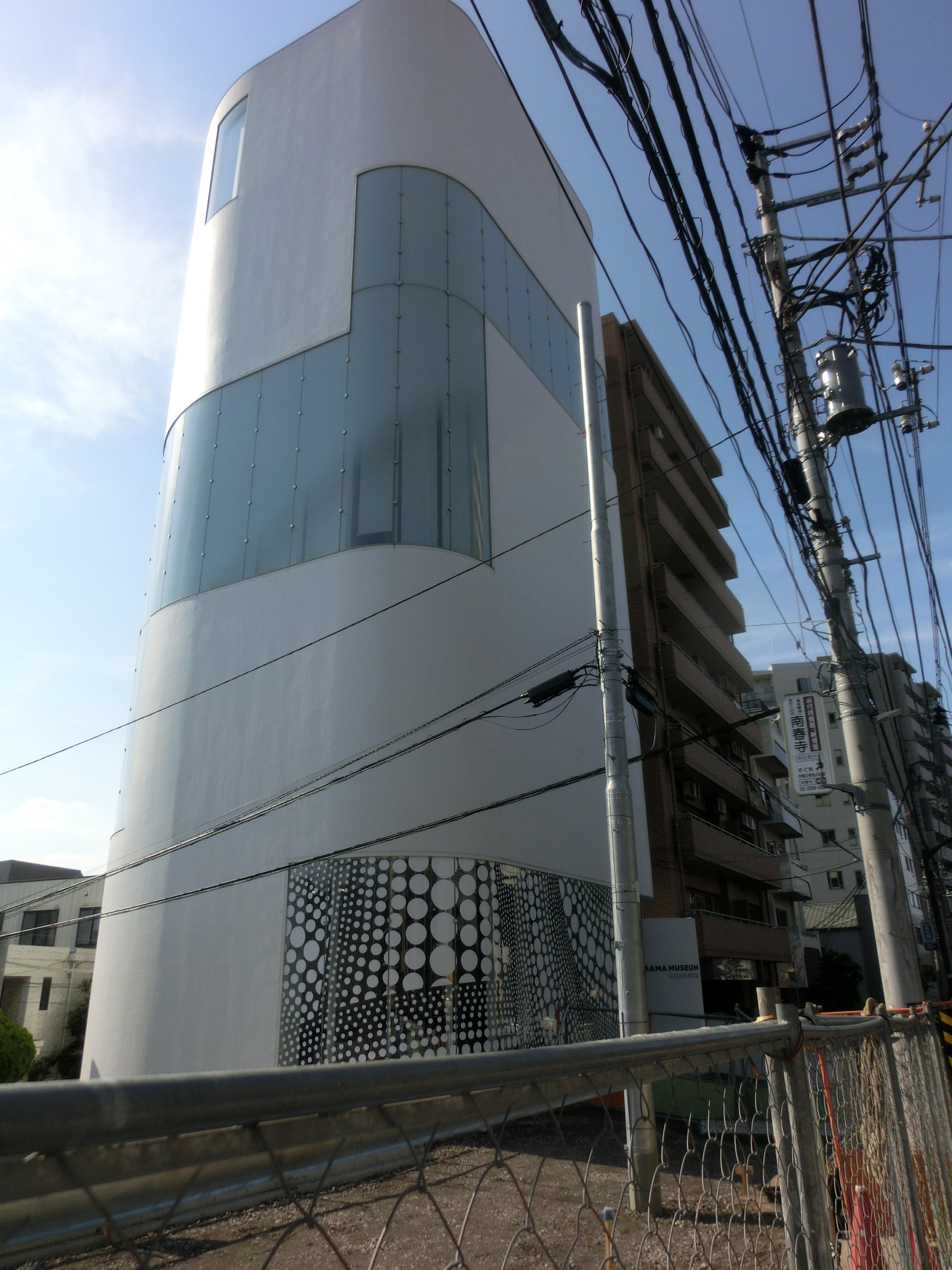
- Yayoi Kusama Museum, Tokyo

- Location within Tokyo Yamanote Loop Location within Tokyo wards area
- Location: 107 Bentencho, Shinjuku City, Tokyo, Japan
- Coordinates: 35°42′12″N 139°43′35″E
- Website: yayoikusamamuseum.jp/en

The Yayoi Kusama Museum is a contemporary art museum in Tokyo, Japan, dedicated to the work of the Japanese artist Yayoi Kusama. The museum is located in the Shinjuku Ward, in the western suburbs of Tokyo. The Museum is the principal project of the Yayoi Kusama Foundation.

The five-floor building was designed by the Japanese architecture firm Kume Sekkei. Construction was completed in 2014, and it opened in 2017 with an inaugural exhibition of 600 of Kusama's works. One floor of the museum is dedicated to one of Kusama's infinity room installations, titled Pumpkins Screaming About Love Beyond Infinity.

The museum admits a fixed number of visitors per day, based on timed tickets. In 2018, a year after its opening, the museum was rated number one on Time Out's global "do list".

== Publications ==
The museum has published a number of books about its special exhibitions:

- Yayoi Kusama Foundation Inaugural Exhibition: Creation is a Solitary Pursuit, Love Is What Brings You Closer To Art (2017)
- Here, Now, I Have Reached The Grandest Start of My Life (2018)
- I Want You To Look at my Prospects for the Future: Plants and I (2018)
- Here, Another Night Comes from Trillions of Light Years Away: Eternal Infinity (2019)
- Spirits of Aggregation (2019)
- Zero Is Infinity - Zero and Yayoi Kusama (2020)
- The Vision of Fantasy That We Have Never Seen is This Splendor (2020)
- Midway Between Mystery and Symbol: Yayoi Kusama’s Monochrome (2021)
- A Poem in My Heart (2022)
- Every Day I Pray For Love (2022)
- Yayoi Kusama’s Self-Obliteration / Psychedelic World (2023)
- Visionary Colors (2023)
- Yayoi Kusama: Portraying The Figurative (2024)
- I Would Overcome Death And Go On Living (2024)
- Reverberation From The Universe (2025)

== See also ==
- List of single-artist museums
