= Jojo Baby =

American artist

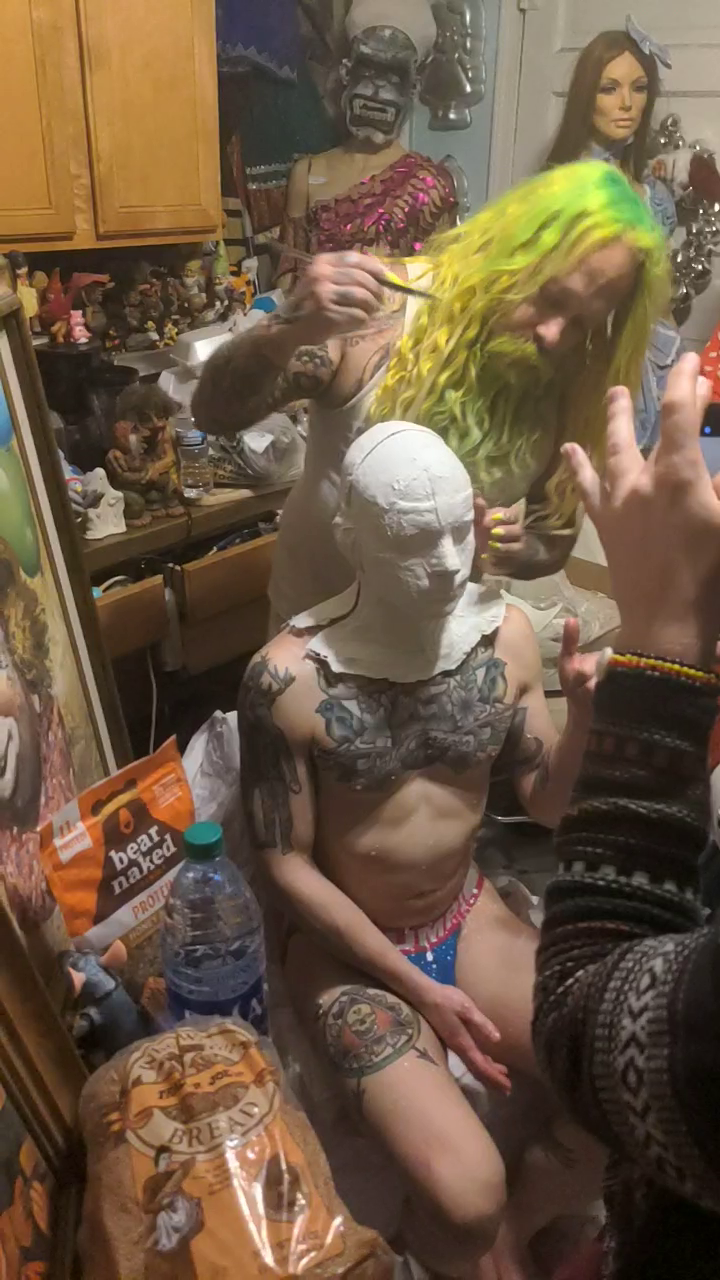
- Born: Joseph Arguellas; 10 April 1971; Chicago, Illinois
- Died: 14 March 2023 (aged 51); Chicago, Illinois
- Education: Quigley Preparatory Seminary (1 year)
- Known for: Drag, Visual art, Doll-making
- Style: Avant-garde
- Partner: Corey Ecay

Jojo Baby (April 10, 1971 – March 14, 2023) was a Chicago-based visual artist, drag performer, doll-maker, and hairdresser known for its contributions to the city's nightlife scene, artistic work, impact on drag, and as a hair stylist for Dennis Rodman.

== Early life ==
Born in Chicago on April 10, 1971 to a Greek immigrant father and Native American mother, Jojo Baby, originally named Joseph Arguellas, grew up in the Logan Square neighborhood.

Baby's mother, a former Chicago Playboy Club bunny, coined the pet name "Jojo Baby," which eventually became its stage and legal name. Jojo Baby's early exposure to makeup came from attending Mary Kay parties with its mother, where it developed a fascination with cosmetics. At the age of 14, Jojo left home due to its father's homophobia and moved into a space in Lakeview with other Club Kids.

Despite initially intending to become a Franciscan monk, Jojo's theatrical nature led it down a different path. After dropping out of Quigley Preparatory Seminary North, it explored its artistic talents.

== Career ==
=== Performance art ===
Jojo Baby was a prominent figure in Chicago's nightlife scene, captivating audiences with its avant-garde performances and striking appearance as both a nightlife host and drag artist. It frequented iconic venues such as Shelter in River North, Foxy's in Lake View, Debonair Social Club, Neo, Berlin Nightclub, and the "Queen!" LGBTQ+ party at Smartbar in Wrigleyville.

=== Hair stylist ===
Jojo Baby also worked as a hairstylist at Milio's Hair Salon in Chicago, styling hair for notable personalities like Dennis Rodman during the Chicago Bulls' heyday in the 1990s.

=== Visual arts and doll-maker ===
In addition to performances, Jojo Baby was a prolific visual artist and doll-maker. Its dolls, displayed at galleries in Wicker Park and Ukrainian Village featured a distinctive style characterized by jointed skeletons, foam rubber muscles, and human, coyote, sheep, and goat hair. Mentored by Greer Lankton, Jojo learned to build armatures for their dolls. Its creations often featured a full chakra system and "good" voodoo elements. Jojo Baby also ran a studio and gallery in Chicago's Flat Iron Building for many years. Jojo Baby cited Boy George, Clive Barker, and Jim Henson as major influences on its work.

=== Film and television work ===
As an actor, Jojo Baby made notable appearances in several films and music videos throughout its career, including:

- Scrooge & Marley (2012) - as the Ghost of Christmas Future
- Chicago Rot (2016) - as Jojo Baby
- Bill & Phil: Dirty Eye (2017) - in the art department for the music video
- The Man of My Dream (2009) - as the Tarot Reader in the short film.

In 2010, Jojo was the subject of a documentary by Clive Barker titled Clive Barker Presents Jojo Baby: Without the Mask. The film debuted in 2011 at the 29th Chicago Lesbian and Gay International Film Festival.

=== Notable collaborators ===
As a hair stylist, visual artist, and performer, Jojo Baby has collaborated with a number of notable artists, performers, and athletes. Baby is remembered for working closely with Dennis Rodman, who it met at Shelter Nightclub, in the 1990s to design the leopard print buzz cut hair style, which has continued to be worn by other artists and performers since then. Baby is also known for performing with or alongside musicians such as Peaches, Lords of Acid, and the Revolting Cocks.

== In popular culture ==
=== Books ===
Jojo Baby's influence and contributions to Chicago's nightlife and drag scene have been noted in various books, including:

- Cohn, Scotti. Chicago Curiosities: Quirky Characters, Roadside Oddities & Other Offbeat Stuff. Globe Pequot, 2011. eBook, ISBN 9780762774999
- Salkind, Micah. Do You Remember House?: Chicago's Queer of Color Undergrounds. Oxford University Press, 2020. ISBN 0190698411
- Hastings, Magnus. Why Drag?. Chronicle Books, 2016. ISBN 9781452148977
- Harder, Chris. Getting Into Face: 52 Mondays Featuring RuPaul's Drag Race, Queens, and the Occasional King. Schiffer, 2012. ISBN 0764342010
- Hanson, Harry James, and Devin Antheus. Legends of Drag: Queens of a Certain Age. Abrams, 2022. ISBN 1647005086, ISBN 9781647005085

== Personal life and health struggles ==
Jojo Baby was engaged to Corey Ecay at the time of its death. Although Baby was gender fluid and used multiple pronouns, including they/them/their, Baby preferred the pronoun "it". Baby was also known for its tattoos, which repeated and reclaimed the many insults and disparaging remarks directed at the artist throughout their life.

Jojo Baby faced significant health challenges throughout life, including living with HIV and beating testicular cancer. It spoke candidly about health battles, as well as their Roman Catholic upbringing and estrangement from a homophobic father.

== Human skulls incident ==
Jojo Baby once stumbled upon a pot of boiling water containing human skulls while visiting a Bucktown apartment to purchase mannequins. Brian Sloan, the apartment's tenant, was preparing the skulls for shipment to an online buyer. Jojo Baby, initially startled by the sight, eventually called the police, sparking a series of events involving law enforcement and the Cook County medical examiner's office.

== Legacy and recognition ==
Jojo Baby's work is included in collections at institutions such as the Museum of Contemporary Art in Chicago, Paris London Hong Kong, also in Chicago, and Luxembourg + Co gallery in New York City. Jojo Baby's work is described in a press release announcing the Paris London Hong Kong show:

Known for decades as Chicago’s preeminent nightlife club kid, JoJo Baby’s artistic practice blurs the line between costume and prop, authentic self and invented character. Mixing elements of drag, theatrical costuming, prosthetics, and skeletal mechanics, JoJo Baby is an artist at once individually iconic, and forever in a state of flux and cultural invention.

In a separate review of the same show, "the bandages are off," Vasia Rigou describes how the artist "brings together the perverse and the fantastical to comment on today's culture, to evolve, to heal." Rigou notes how the title of the show was itself a reference to Jojo's cancer diagnosis and ongoing chemotherapy treatments.

== Death ==
Jojo Baby died on March 14, 2023, from complications related to liver, lung, and stomach cancer. A memorial and celebration of life was held April 9, 2023 at Metro, a Chicago nightclub where Baby performed, to commemorate its legacy.
