= You Who Are Getting Obliterated in the Dancing Swarm of Fireflies =

2005 art installation

- Artist: Yayoi Kusama
- Year: 2005
- Medium: LED lights and mirrors
- Movement: Contemporary art
- Dimensions: 24 ft (7.3 m) x 24 ft (7.3 m)
- Location: Phoenix Art Museum
- 33.4661°N 112.0734°W

You Who Are Getting Obliterated in the Dancing Swarm of Fireflies, also known as the Fireflies Infinity Mirror Room, is an art installation in Phoenix Art Museum by Yayoi Kusama. It is located in the museum's North Wing, on the first floor.

== History ==
The installation has been on view at Phoenix Art Museum since 2006. In 2023, the exhibit was temporarily closed as it was moved to the first floor to be made more accessible. Additional technology upgrades were also done to "enhance the visitor experience."

== Description ==
The room is a reflection of Kusama's hallucinations that she had had since she was a child. The installation, which is mostly made up of LED lights and mirrors, allows the viewer to "obliterate" themselves and unite themselves with the room. It also references the Japanese tradition of hotaru gari — firefly-watching and tōrō nagashi, Japanese water lanterns. The room is 24 ft (7.3 m) on both sides, for a total of 576 sq ft (53.5 m^{2}). Almost 200 hanging LED lights brighten up, dull, and change colors.
