= Primary Information =

Brooklyn NGO

Primary Information is a Brooklyn-based non-profit organization that publishes artist books, artists’ writings, re-publishes out-of-print art publications and limited art editions.

== History ==
Formed in 2006, Primary Information was created to foster inter-generational dialogue through the publication of artists’ books and writings by artists. The organization’s period of focus is from the early-1960s to the present, with an emphasis on conceptual art and post-conceptual art practice.

== Funding ==
Primary Information receives support through grants from the Andy Warhol Foundation for the Visual Arts, The National Endowment for the Arts and other organizations and individuals.

== See also ==
- List of book arts centers
- NY Art Book Fair
