= Yayoi Kusama =

Japanese artist (1929–2026)

- 草間 彌生
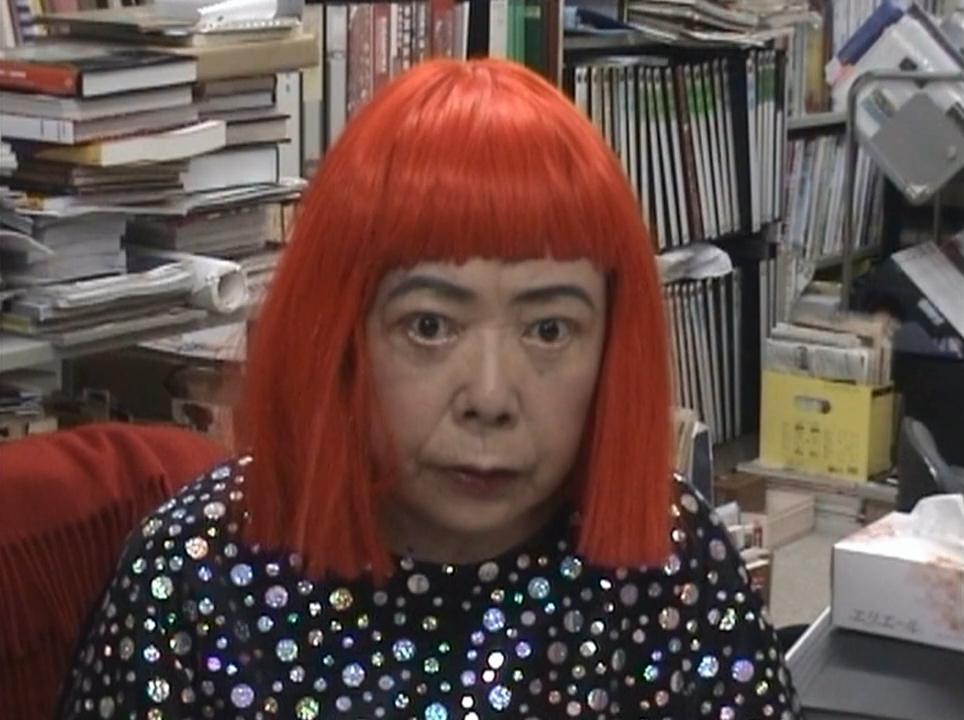
- Kusama in 2005
- Born: 22 March 1929; Matsumoto, Nagano, Empire of Japan
- Died: 14 August 2026 (aged 97); Tokyo, Japan
- Known for: painting; drawing; sculpture; installation art; performance art; film; fiction; fashion; writing
- Movement: pop art; minimalism; feminist art; environmental art
- Awards: Praemium Imperiale
- Website: yayoi-kusama.jp/en/

Yayoi Kusama (草間 彌生, Kusama Yayoi; 22 March 1929 – 14 August 2026) was a Japanese artist who worked primarily in sculpture and installation. She was also active in painting, performance art, video art, fashion, poetry, and fiction. Rooted in conceptual art, her work incorporates elements of feminist art, minimalism, surrealism, art brut, pop art, and abstract expressionism, and is infused with autobiographical, psychological, and sexual themes. Acknowledged as one of the most important artists to emerge from Japan, she was among the world's top-selling female artists, ranking 19th on Sotheby's 2023 list of the top 50 artists. Her work influenced her contemporaries, including Andy Warhol and Claes Oldenburg.

Raised in Matsumoto, Kusama trained for a year at the Kyoto Municipal School of Arts and Crafts in the traditional Japanese painting style nihonga. Drawn to European and American avant-garde movements—particularly abstract expressionism—she moved to New York City in 1958 and was a part of the New York avant-garde scene throughout the 1960s, especially in the pop art movement. Embracing the rise of the hippie counterculture of the late 1960s, she came to public attention when she organized a series of happenings in which nude participants were painted with brightly colored polka dots. Although her work was largely overlooked during the 1970s, critical and popular interest revived in the late 1980s, leading to major retrospectives and permanent installations at museums worldwide.

Open about her struggles with mental illness, Kusama voluntarily resided in a Tokyo psychiatric hospital from 1977 until her death, crediting art as her primary means of coping with her condition. "I fight pain, anxiety, and fear every day, and the only method I have found that relieved my illness is to keep creating art", she told an interviewer in 2012. "I followed the thread of art and somehow discovered a path that would allow me to live."

== Life and career ==
=== Early life: 1929–1949 ===
Yayoi Kusama was born on 22 March 1929 in Matsumoto, Nagano. Born into a merchant family that owned a plant nursery and seed farm, Kusama began drawing pumpkins in elementary school and depicting imagery from her visual hallucinations—motifs that would later define her career. Her mother was not supportive of her creative endeavors; Kusama would rush to finish her art because her mother would take it away to discourage her. Her mother was physically abusive, and she remembered her father as "the type who would play around, who would womanize a lot". She said her mother would often send her to spy on her father's extramarital affairs, which instilled in her a lifelong aversion to sexuality, particularly the male body and the phallus: "I don't like sex. I had an obsession with sex. When I was a child, my father had lovers and I experienced seeing him. My mother sent me to spy on him. I didn't want to have sex with anyone for years ... The sexual obsession and fear of sex sit side by side in me." Pumpkins, which became a central motif in her art, first captivated her during a childhood visit to a large seed-harvesting ground with her grandfather. She recalled being "enchanted by their charming and winsome form" and their "generous unpretentiousness", despite their humble status.

At age ten, Kusama began experiencing vivid hallucinations that she described as "flashes of light, auras, or dense fields of dots", including talking flowers and fabric patterns that appeared to come to life, multiply, and engulf her. Art became her refuge from both her family and her hallucinations, and she translated this sensation of being absorbed into her surroundings into an artistic practice she termed "self-obliteration". She also cited the smooth white stones covering the riverbed near her family home as a formative influence on her lifelong fixation with dots.

During the Pacific War, when Kusama was 13, she was sent to work in a military factory where she was tasked with making parachutes for the Imperial Japanese Army. Discussing her time in the factory, she recalled spending her adolescence "in closed darkness", though she constantly heard air raid sirens and saw American B-29s flying overhead during the day. While attending Nagano Prefectural Matsumoto Arigasaki High School, the wartime deprivation shaped her enduring commitment to personal and creative freedom.

She went on to study nihonga painting at the Kyoto Municipal School of Arts and Crafts in 1948. Frustrated with this distinctly Japanese style, she became interested in the European and American avant-garde, staging several solo exhibitions of her paintings in Matsumoto and Tokyo in the 1950s.

=== Early success in Japan: 1950–1956 ===
By 1950, she was depicting abstract natural forms in watercolor, gouache, and oil paint, primarily on paper. She began covering surfaces—walls, floors, canvases, and later household objects and nude assistants—with the polka dots that became her signature motif. She held her first solo exhibition in Matsumoto in 1952.

The earliest recorded work in which she incorporated these dots was a drawing in 1939 at age 10, in which the image of a Japanese woman in a kimono, presumed to be the artist's mother, is covered and obliterated by spots. These dotted fields prefigured her large-scale Infinity Nets paintings—some stretching more than 30 feet (9.1 m) in length—which she covered entirely in rhythmic sequences of nets and dots alluding to her hallucinatory visions.

Although never officially affiliated with Surrealism, Kusama engaged with the movement in early gouaches such as A Circus Rider's Dream (1955) and corresponded with poet-critic Shūzō Takiguchi, a leading proponent of Surrealism in Japan.

Regarding her 1954 painting Flower (D.S.P.S.), Kusama recalled:

One day I was looking at the red flower patterns of the tablecloth on a table, and when I looked up I saw the same pattern covering the ceiling, the windows, and the walls, and finally all over the room, my body and the universe. I felt as if I had begun to self-obliterate, to revolve in the infinity of endless time and the absoluteness of space, and be reduced to nothingness. As I realised it was actually happening and not just in my imagination, I was frightened. I knew I had to run away lest I should be deprived of my life by the spell of the red flowers. I ran desperately up the stairs. The steps below me began to fall apart and I fell down the stairs spraining my ankle.

=== New York City: 1957–1972 ===
After exhibiting in Matsumoto and Tokyo, Kusama left Japan for the United States in 1957 at the age of 28, finding Japanese society "too small, too servile, too feudalistic, and too scornful of women". Before leaving Japan, she destroyed many of her early works. She remained in Seattle for a year, holding an exhibition of paintings at the Zoe Dusanne Gallery, before relocating to New York City, having corresponded with Georgia O'Keeffe to seek advice on entering the city's art world. Arriving in New York City in 1958, she developed her signature Infinity Nets paintings and early soft sculptures. She achieved critical acclaim with her 1959 solo exhibition at the Brata Gallery and subsequently pioneered body-art performances and happenings. In the United States, she quickly established a reputation as a leading figure in the avant-garde and drew praise from anarchist art critic Herbert Read.

In 1961, she moved her studio into the same building as Donald Judd and sculptor Eva Hesse; Hesse became a close friend. In the early 1960s, Kusama began creating 'Accumulation' soft sculptures by covering everyday objects—such as ladders, shoes, and chairs—with sewn white phallic protrusions. Despite the painstaking intricacy of her works on paper and sculptures, she produced them rapidly and in large quantities, establishing a prolific work ethic that she maintained throughout her life. She also cultivated her public persona, routinely having herself photographed alongside new pieces and appearing in public in signature bob wigs and avant-garde attire.

In June 1963, one of Kusama's soft sculpture pieces, a couch covered with phallus-like protrusions she had sewn, was exhibited at the Green Gallery. The same exhibition included a papier-mâché piece by Claes Oldenburg, who had not previously worked in soft sculpture. Kusama's couch drew significant critical attention, and by September Oldenburg was exhibiting his own sewn soft sculptures, several of which closely resembled Kusama's; Oldenburg's wife, Patty Mucha, apologized to Kusama at the opening. According to Fordham University art historian Midori Yamamura, Kusama's work likely inspired Oldenburg to adopt sewn forms, a medium that propelled him to international stardom and left Kusama deeply depressed. A similar incident followed her Aggregation: One Thousand Boats Show (1963), in which she displayed a rowboat covered in sewn phallic forms inside a room papered floor-to-ceiling with 999 photographic posters of the vessel. Andy Warhol visited the installation and later wallpapered an exhibition space with silkscreened cow imagery to wide acclaim. Growing increasingly guarded about her studio practice, Kusama felt marginalized by the male-dominated New York art world; curator Helaine Posner of the Neuberger Museum of Art later attributed Kusama's lack of equivalent recognition and financial backing to a combination of sexism and racism.

A polka-dot has the form of the sun, which is a symbol of the energy of the whole world and our living life, and also the form of the moon, which is calm. Round, soft, colorful, senseless and unknowing. Polka-dots become movement ... Polka dots are a way to infinity.

— Yayoi Kusama, In Manhattan Suicide Addict (1978)

In 1965, Kusama debuted her first infinity mirror installation, Infinity Mirror Room – Phalli's Field, followed by Kusama's Peep Show (also known as Endless Love Show) in 1966. In these purpose-built mirrored chambers, repeated reflections of sculptural forms or colored lights created the illusion of boundless space.

During the following years, Kusama was enormously productive, and by 1966, she was experimenting with room-size, freestanding installations that incorporated mirrors, lights, and piped-in music. She counted Judd and Joseph Cornell among her friends and supporters. However, she did not profit financially from her work. Around this time, Kusama was hospitalized regularly from overwork, and O'Keeffe persuaded her own dealer, Edith Halpert, to purchase several works to help Kusama avoid financial ruin. Unable to earn a sustainable living despite her critical profile, Kusama grew deeply frustrated and attempted suicide.

In 1966, Kusama participated in the Venice Biennale for its 33rd edition. Her Narcissus Garden comprised 1,500 mass-produced, reflective plastic spheres installed outdoors, in what she called a "kinetic carpet". As soon as the piece was installed on a lawn outside the Italian pavilion, Kusama, dressed in a golden kimono, began selling each individual sphere for 1,200 lira (US$2), until the Biennale organizers put an end to her enterprise. Narcissus Garden was as much about the promotion of the artist through the media as it was an opportunity to offer a critique of the mechanization and commodification of the art market.

In the 1960s, Kusama organized outlandish happenings in conspicuous spots like Central Park and the Brooklyn Bridge, often involving nudity and designed to protest the Vietnam War. In one, she wrote an open letter to Richard Nixon offering to have sex with him if he would stop the war. Between 1967 and 1969, she concentrated on performances held with the maximum publicity, usually involving her painting polka dots on her nude performers, as in the Grand Orgy to Awaken the Dead at the MoMA (1969), in which performers were instructed to embrace each other while engaging the sculptures around them at the sculpture garden of the Museum of Modern Art. During the unannounced event, eight performers under Kusama's direction removed their clothing, stepped nude into a fountain, and assumed poses mimicking the nearby sculptures by Picasso, Giacometti, and Maillol.

In 1968, Kusama presided over the happening Homosexual Wedding at her 'Church of Self-Obliteration' at 33 Walker Street and performed alongside Fleetwood Mac and Country Joe and the Fish at New York's Fillmore East. She also opened nude painting studios and a gay social club, the Kusama 'Omophile Kompany (KOK). The public nudity in her performances deeply mortified her family in Japan, and her former high school struck her name from its alumni rolls, exacerbating her isolation and precipitating another suicide attempt.

She subsequently formed an intense, platonic bond with Cornell, who was 26 years her senior; they telephoned daily, sketched one another, and exchanged personalized collages until his death in 1972.

=== Return to Japan: 1973–1977 ===
In 1973, Kusama returned to Japan. Her reception from the Japanese art world and press was unsympathetic; one art collector recalled considering her a "scandal queen".

Severely depressed and unable to work, Kusama attempted suicide again. In 1977, after consulting a physician who used art therapy in a clinical setting, she voluntarily admitted herself to Seiwa Hospital, a psychiatric hospital in Shinjuku, Tokyo, where she took up permanent residence for the rest of her life. From the mid-1970s onward, she worked daily at her studio a short distance from the hospital. Kusama is often quoted as saying: "If it were not for art, I would have killed myself a long time ago."

Her painting style shifted to vividly colored acrylics on canvas on a monumental scale.

=== Revival: 1980s–2026 ===
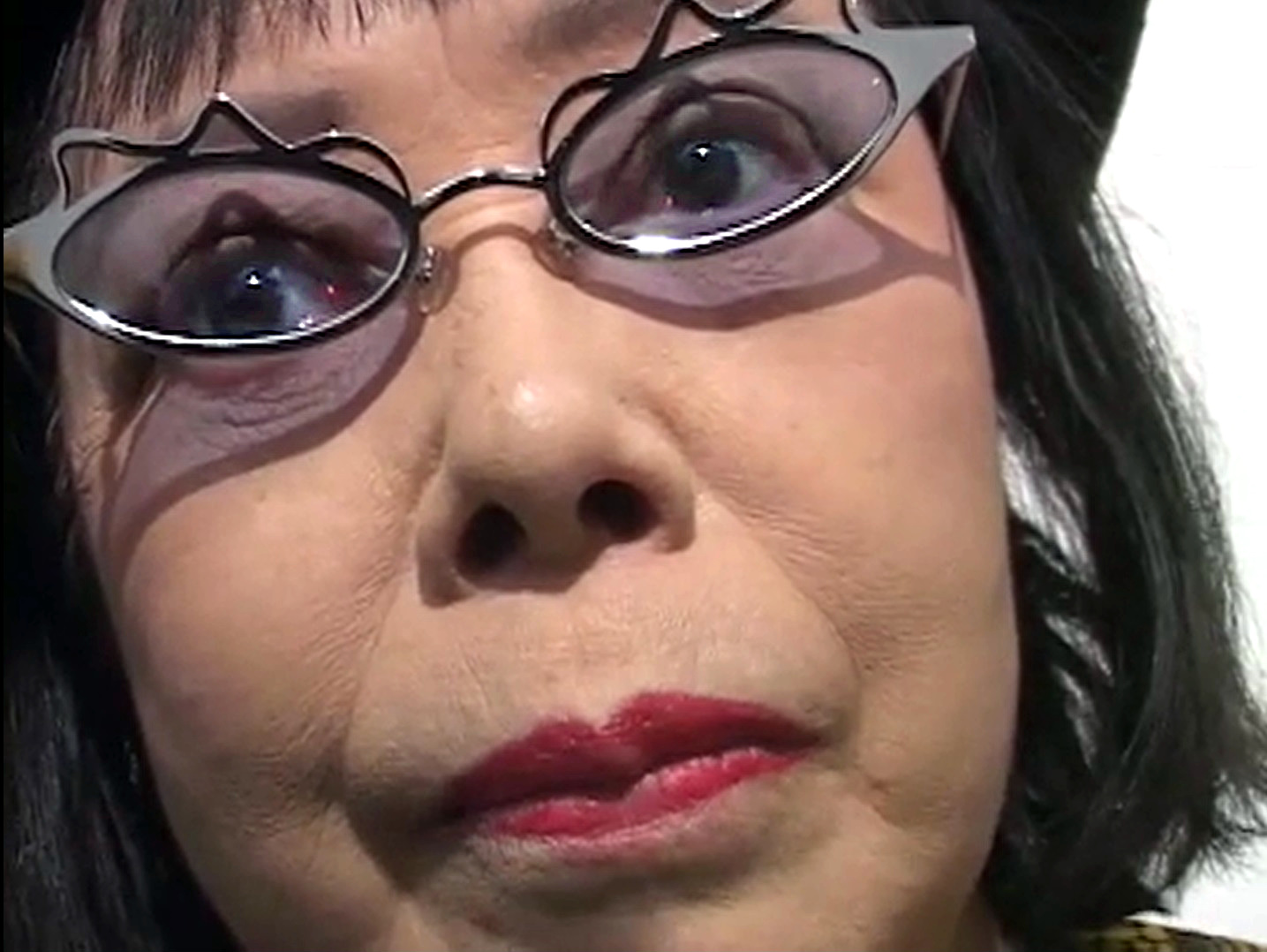
Kusama c. 2004

Kusama's move to Japan meant she had to build a new career from scratch. Her organically abstract paintings of one or two colors (the Infinity Nets series), which she began upon arriving in New York, garnered comparisons to the work of Jackson Pollock, Mark Rothko, and Barnett Newman. When she left New York, she was practically forgotten as an artist until the late 1980s and 1990s, when a number of retrospectives revived international interest. In 1989, the Center for International Contemporary Arts (CICA) in New York mounted Yayoi Kusama: A Retrospective, the first critical survey of her career in the United States, curated by Alexandra Munroe.

At the 45th Venice Biennale in 1993, Kusama became the first solo female artist to represent Japan at the Japanese pavilion, staging a mirrored installation filled with small pumpkin sculptures in which she sat wearing color-coordinated magician's attire. Following its acclaim, she created a monumental yellow pumpkin sculpture covered in an optical pattern of black dots, viewing the pumpkin as a personal alter ego or self-portrait. The 2.5-metre-wide (8.2 ft) Pumpkin, cast in fiberglass-reinforced plastic, was installed on a pier on Naoshima, Kagawa, in 1994, becoming iconic as her profile grew in the following decades; it was reinstalled in 2022 after being destroyed by a typhoon a year earlier. Kusama's installation I'm Here, but Nothing (2000–2008) places a simply furnished domestic room—complete with a table, chairs, place settings, armchairs, and rugs—under ultraviolet light, illuminating hundreds of fluorescent polka dots across every surface so that the room and viewer appear obliterated into infinite space.

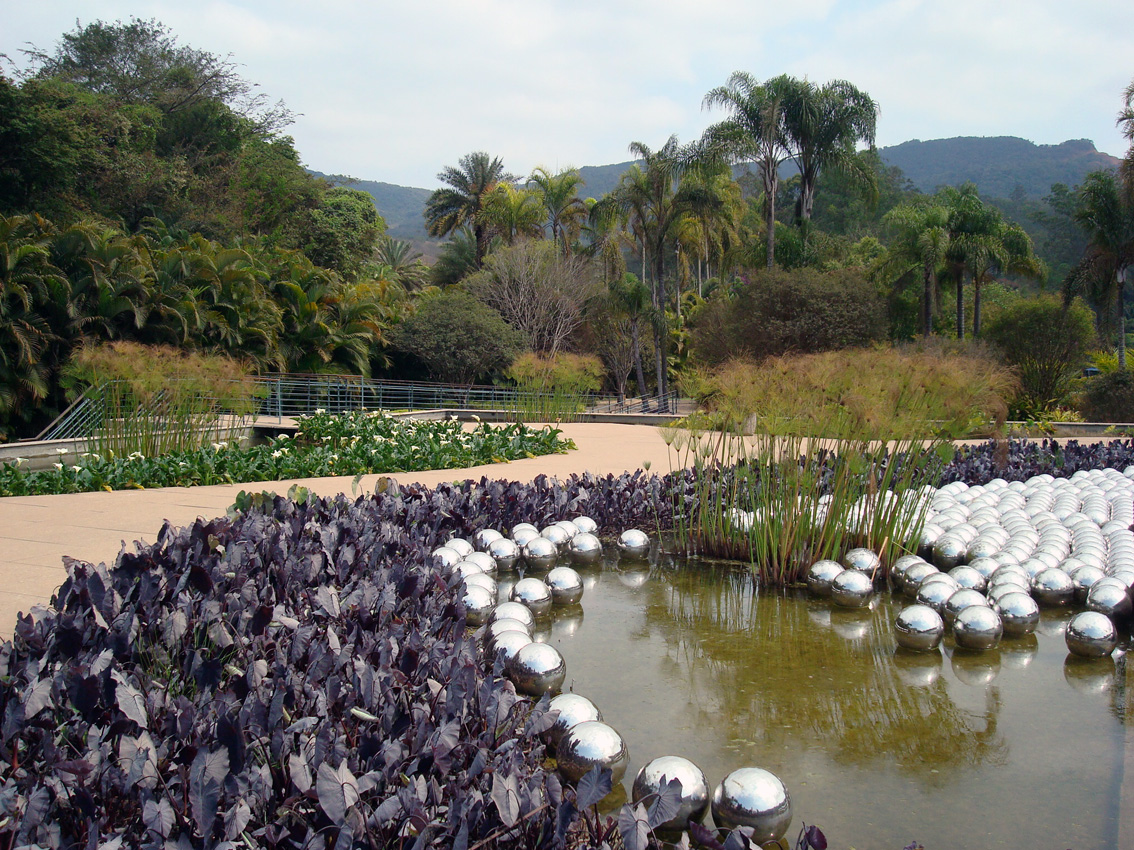
Narcissus Garden (2009), Instituto Inhotim, Brumadinho, Brazil

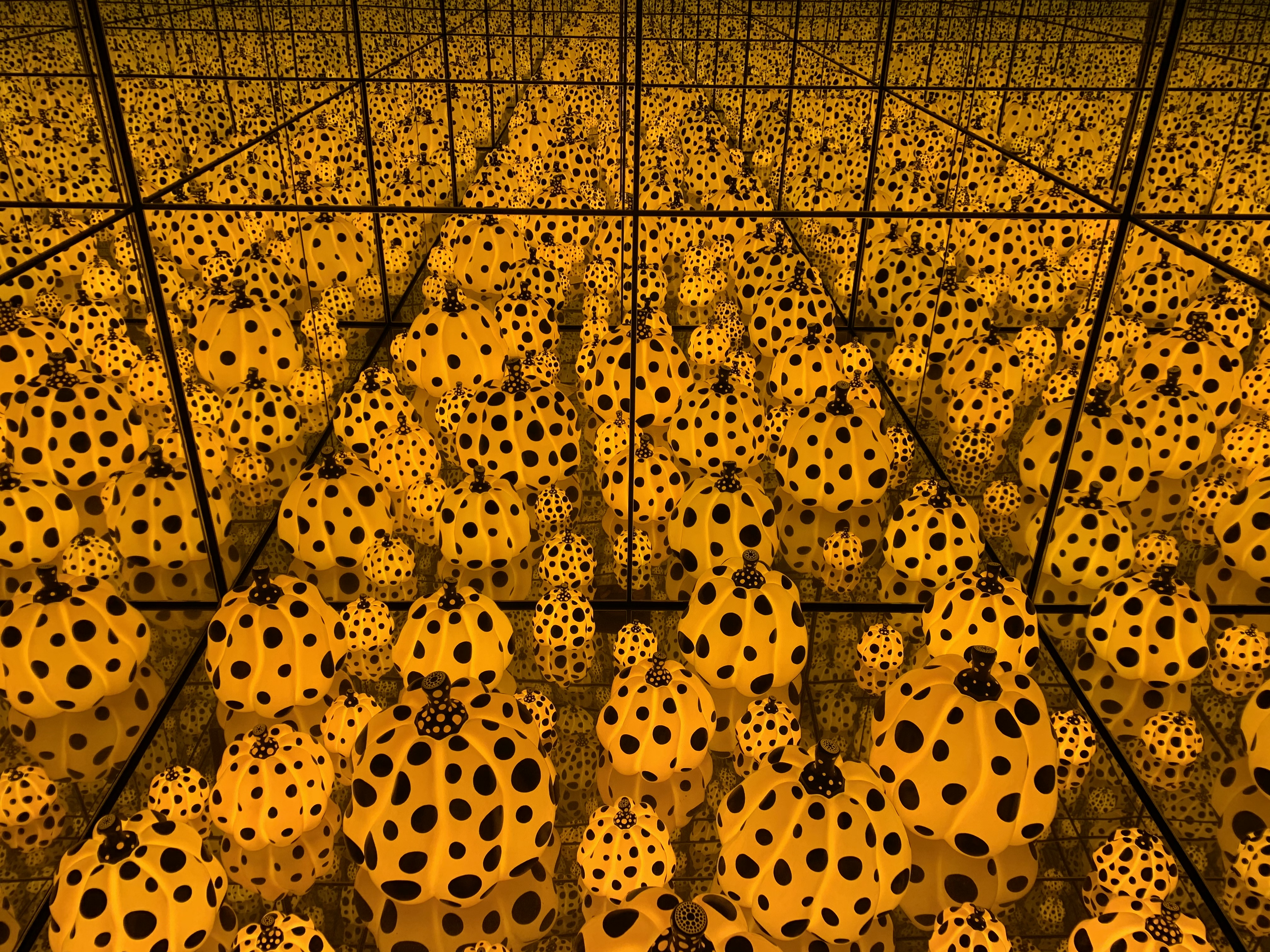
The Spirits of the Pumpkins Descended into the Heavens (2017), National Gallery of Australia, Canberra, Australia

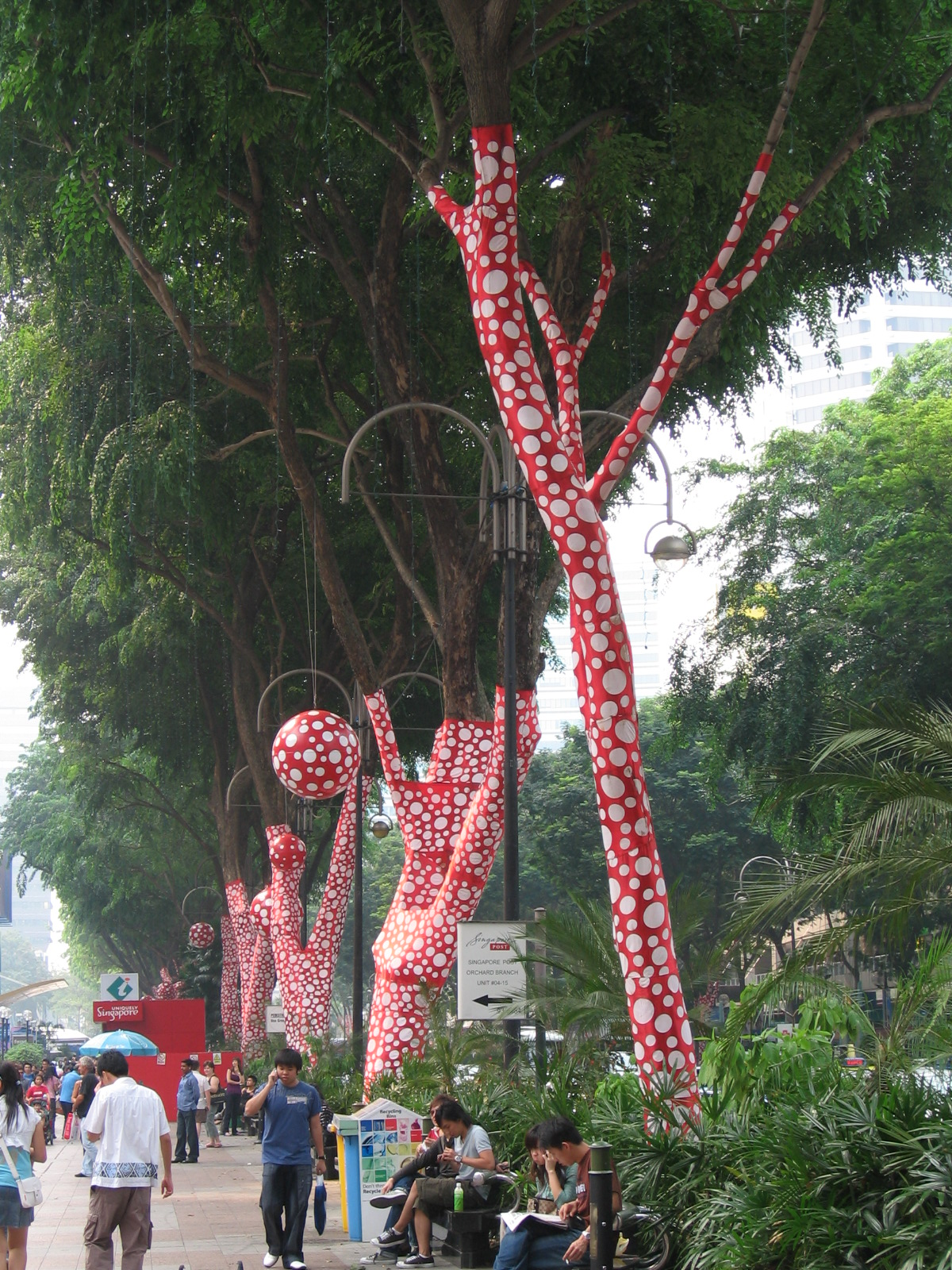
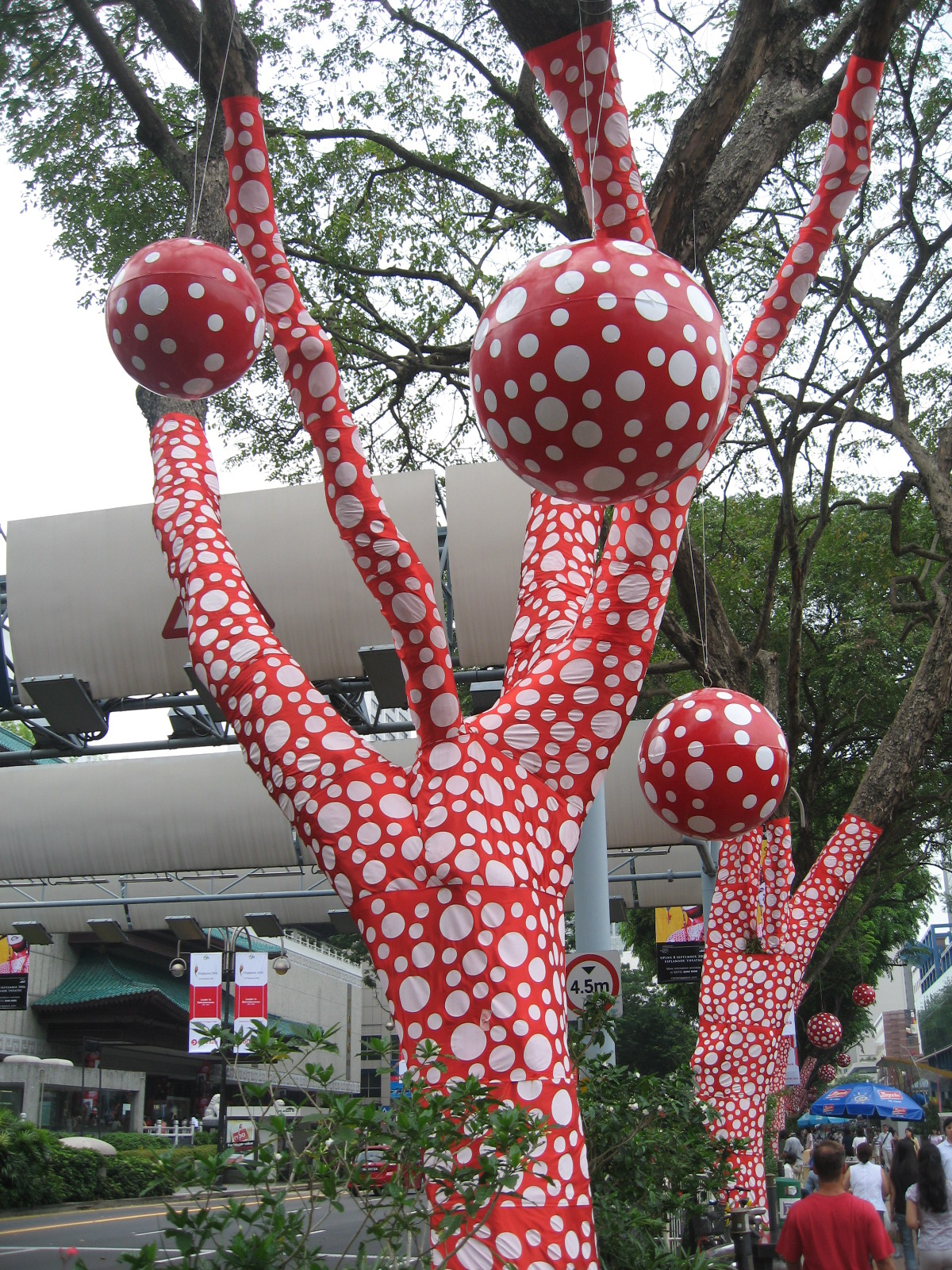
Yayoi Kusama's Ascension of Polka Dots on the Trees at the Singapore Biennale 2006 on Orchard Road, Singapore

In 2009, her multi-part floating installation Guidepost to the New Space—a series of rounded, fire-engine-red forms with white polka dots—was installed on Pandanus Lake at Fairchild Tropical Botanic Garden in Florida. New iterations of her celebrated 1966 installation Narcissus Garden were also presented at venues worldwide, including Le Consortium in Dijon (2000), the Kunstverein Braunschweig (2003), the Whitney Biennial in Central Park (2004), and the Tuileries Garden in Paris (2010).

Working prolificly into her eighties and nineties, Kusama returned to large-scale drawing and acrylic painting alongside her Infinity Mirror rooms—typically cube-shaped mirrored chambers incorporating shallow water and flickering lights to evoke cycles of life and death. Earlier, a 1996 residency at the Mattress Factory in Pittsburgh had produced two permanent mirrored installations, Infinity Dots Mirrored Room and Repetitive Vision, displayed alongside Dots Obsession.

From 2015 to 2016, the first retrospective exhibition in the Nordic countries, curated by Marie Laurberg, traveled to four major museums in the region, opening at Louisiana Museum of Modern Art in Denmark and continuing to Henie Onstad Kunstsenter in Norway, Moderna Museet in Sweden, and Helsinki Art Museum in Finland. This major show contained more than 100 objects and large-scale mirror room installations. It presented several early works that had not been shown to the public since they were first created, including a presentation of Kusama's experimental fashion design from the 1960s.

In 2017, a 50-year retrospective of her work opened at the Hirshhorn Museum in Washington, D.C.. The exhibit featured six Infinity Mirror rooms, and traveled to five museums in the U.S. and Canada.

On 25 February 2017, All the Eternal Love I Have for the Pumpkins—one of the six Infinity Mirror rooms in the Hirshhorn exhibition—closed for three days after a visitor damaged one of its glowing pumpkin sculptures. Measuring roughly 13.6 by 13.6 feet (4.1 m × 4.1 m) and containing more than 60 acrylic pumpkins, the chamber had drawn over 8,000 visitors prior to the incident. The installation was reconfigured while Kusama fabricated a replacement sculpture. The Infinity Mirrors exhibit became a sensation among art critics as well as on social media. Museum visitors shared 34,000 images of the exhibition to their Instagram accounts, and social media posts using the hashtag #InfiniteKusama garnered 330 million impressions, as reported by the Smithsonian the day after the exhibit's closing. The immersive installations proved popular for selfies, which critics noted added a contemporary performative dimension to the works.

Later in 2017, the Yayoi Kusama Museum opened in Tokyo, featuring her works.

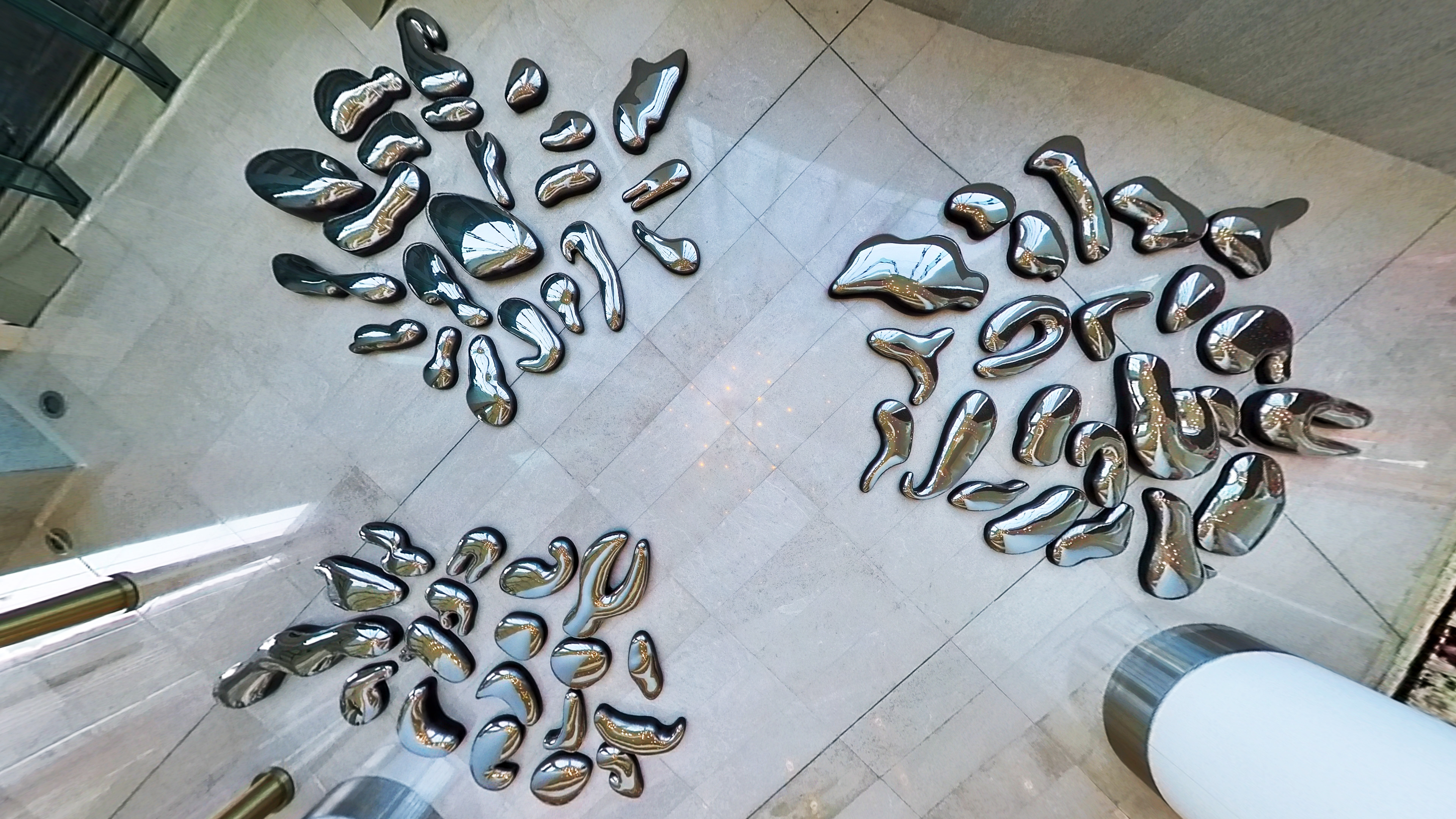
Clouds (2019) at the Nita Mukesh Ambani Cultural Centre in Mumbai, India

On 9 November 2019, Kusama's Every Day I Pray for Love exhibition was shown at David Zwirner Gallery until 14 December. The exhibition incorporated sculptures and paintings, and included the debut of her Infinity Mirrored Room – Dancing Lights That Flew Up to the Universe. The catalogue, published by David Zwirner Books, contained texts and poems.

In January 2020, the Hirshhorn announced it would debut new Kusama acquisitions, including two Infinity Mirror Rooms, at a forthcoming exhibition called One with Eternity: Yayoi Kusama in the Hirshhorn Collection. The name of the exhibit was derived from an open letter Kusama wrote to then-President-elect Richard Nixon in 1968, writing: "let's forget ourselves, dearest Richard, and become one with the absolute, all together in the altogether."

In November 2021, a major retrospective spanning seven decades of Kusama's career—featuring roughly 200 works and four Infinity Mirror Rooms—opened at the Tel Aviv Museum of Art. Occupying nearly 3,000 square metres (32,000 sq ft) across six galleries in two buildings, the exhibition debuted two 2021 works: A Bouquet of Love I Saw in the Universe and Light of the Universe Illuminating the Quest for Truth.

In November 2022, Hong Kong's M+ museum opened Yayoi Kusama: 1945 to Now, which ran through May 2023 as the largest retrospective of her work in Asia outside Japan.

From March 2023 to February 2024, the Pérez Art Museum Miami presented Kusama's immersive installation Yayoi Kusama: Love Is Calling.

In 2024, Kusama unveiled a new Infinity Mirror Room titled Infinity Mirrored Room – Beauty Described by a Spherical Heart as part of her solo exhibition Every Day I Pray for Love at the Victoria Miro Gallery in London. The installation featured mirrored spheres suspended within a darkened space, continuing Kusama's exploration of repetition, reflection, and the dissolution of the self through immersive environments. In 2025–2026, a retrospective of Kusama's work toured the Fondation Beyeler in Switzerland, Museum Ludwig in Cologne, and the Stedelijk Museum Amsterdam, featuring works from seven decades of her career. The Stedelijk show subsequently became a posthumous tribute.

Kusama died from multiple organ failure at a hospital in Tokyo on 14 August 2026, at the age of 97; her death was announced on 27 August.

== Mental health ==
Throughout her life, Kusama experienced obsessive–compulsive disorder (OCD), visual and auditory hallucinations, and mania, leading to her voluntary permanent residence at Seiwa Hospital from 1977 until her death. Recalling childhood hallucinations in which dots, flowers, pumpkins, and patterned fabrics appeared to speak to and envelop her, she described translating those overwhelming sensory episodes into art as 'self-obliteration', using soft materials and repetition to process and temper the intensity of her psychological distress.

Critics and biographers have linked her lifelong anxiety and aversion to sexuality to childhood trauma—including her mother's physical abuse, the confiscation of her drawing supplies, being forced to spy on her father's extramarital affairs, and her wartime labor during Allied air raids.

== Meaning and origins of her work ==
Curator Mika Yoshitake observed that Kusama's installations are designed to immerse the viewer entirely in her accumulations, obsessions, and repetitions. Kusama's use of infinite, repetitive patterns originated as a mechanism for coping with intrusive thoughts and later shaped her large-scale environments. Critic Claire Voon wrote that Kusama's mirror rooms can "transport you to [a] quiet cosmos, to a lonely labyrinth of pulsing light, or to what could be the enveloping innards of a leviathan with the measles".

Kusama deliberately structured these environments to evoke empathy for her psychological experiences. Critic Bedatri D. Choudhury suggested that Kusama's lifelong sense of powerlessness over her own mind prompted her—consciously or subconsciously—to assert control over how audiences perceive time and space within her installations.

In works on paper such as Accumulation of Stamps, 63 (1962)—a 60.3 by 73.6 centimetres (23 3/4 in × 29 in) collage of pasted labels and ink on paper donated by architect Philip Johnson to the Museum of Modern Art—Kusama applied store-bought stickers and stamps in dense, repetitive grids. This compulsive process of repetition is reflected in the recurring words Accumulation and Infinity across her titles.

Writing for The Australian, art critic Christopher Allen dismissed Kusama as "one of the world's most determinedly vacuous artists", whereas essayist Emily LaBarge wrote in The New York Times: "Her art invokes the organic world and the vast cosmos beyond, as if to say that the ultimate participatory act in art is to affirm our own place in a much larger world and to show how connected we are to everyone and everything. A welcome spirit, a welcome new art that will always be."

== Works and publications ==
=== Performance ===
In Walking Piece (1966), documented in a series of 18 color slides, Kusama walked along deserted New York City streets wearing a traditional Japanese kimono and carrying a black umbrella painted white on the exterior and adorned with artificial flowers. During the walk, she turned, wept, and eventually receded from view.

Through the juxtaposition of the kimono—associated with traditional Japanese gender roles—and the makeshift parasol, Kusama confronted Western stereotypes of Asian women, underscoring the absurdity of rigid cultural categorization within New York's melting pot.

=== Film ===
In 1968, Kusama and Jud Yalkut's collaborative experimental film Kusama's Self-Obliteration (1967)—which Kusama produced and starred in, painting polka dots across bodies and her surroundings—won prizes at the Fourth International Experimental Film Competition in Knokke, Belgium, and the Second Maryland Film Festival, and took second prize at the Ann Arbor Film Festival. In 1991, Kusama appeared in the film Tokyo Decadence, written and directed by Ryū Murakami.

=== Fashion ===
In 1968, Kusama established Kusama Fashion Company Ltd, and began selling avant-garde fashion in the "Kusama Corner" at Bloomingdale's. In 2009, she designed three limited-edition mobile phones (1,000 units each) for Japanese telecommunications company KDDI Corporation's "iida" brand: Handbag for Space Travel, a handbag-shaped phone; My Doggie Ring-Ring, a pink dotted phone in an accompanying dog-shaped holder; and Dots Obsession, Full Happiness With Dots, a red-and-white-dotted phone housed inside a mirrored, dotted box.

In 2011, Kusama created artwork for six limited-edition lip glosses from Lancôme. That same year, she worked with Marc Jacobs, who visited her studio in Japan in 2006, on a line of Louis Vuitton products, including leather goods, ready-to-wear, accessories, shoes, watches, and jewelry. The products were released in 2012 at a SoHo pop-up shop, which was decorated with Kusama's trademark tentacle-like protrusions and polka dots. Eventually, six other pop-up shops opened around the world. When asked about her collaboration with Jacobs, Kusama said that "his sincere attitude toward art" was the same as her own. Louis Vuitton created a second set of products in 2023.

In 2024, a limited-edition yellow-and-black Louis Vuitton × Yayoi Kusama monogram leather pumpkin handbag sold for US$151,200 at Christie's in New York, setting an auction record for a Louis Vuitton handbag.

=== Writing ===
Beyond her visual art, Kusama maintained a prolific literary career, producing novels, poetry, and autobiographical works that often explore themes of obsession, mental health, sexuality, and her experiences living between Japan and the United States. Her writing formed an important parallel strand of her wider artistic career, reflecting many of the personal ideas and recurring themes that also appear throughout her paintings, installations, and performances.

In 1977, Kusama published a book of poems and paintings, 7. One year later, her first novel, Manhattan Suicide Addict, appeared. Between 1983 and 1990, she finished the novels The Hustler's Grotto of Christopher Street (1983), The Burning of St Mark's Church (1985), Between Heaven and Earth (1988), Woodstock Phallus Cutter (1988), Aching Chandelier (1989), Double Suicide at Sakuragazuka (1989), and Angels in Cape Cod (1990), alongside several issues of the magazine S&M Sniper in collaboration with photographer Nobuyoshi Araki. Her autobiography, Infinity Net (published in Japanese in 2002 and in English translation in 2011), chronicles her upbringing in Japan, her years in New York, and her return to Tokyo, accompanied by poetry and exhibition photographs.

In October 2023, Kusama apologized for a number of racist comments against Black people in her writing, some of which had previously been excluded from English-language translations of her work.

=== Commissions ===
Kusama completed several major outdoor sculptural commissions, mostly in the form of brightly hued monstrous plants and flowers, for both public and private institutions, including Pumpkin (1994) for the Fukuoka Municipal Museum of Art; The Visionary Flowers (2002) for the Matsumoto City Museum of Art; Tsumari in Bloom (2003) for Matsudai Station, Niigata; Tulipes de Shangri-La (2003) for Euralille in Lille, France; Red Pumpkin (2006) for Naoshima, Kagawa; Hello, Anyang with Love (2007) for Pyeonghwa Park in Anyang, South Korea; and The Hymn of Life: Tulips (2007) for the Beverly Gardens Park in Los Angeles. In 1993, she collaborated with British musician Peter Gabriel on an installation in Yokohama. In 1998, she created a tile mural for the concourse of the Gare do Oriente subway station in Lisbon. Alongside these monumental works, she produced smaller-scale outdoor pieces, including Key-Chan and Ryu-Chan, a pair of dotted dogs. All the outdoor works are cast in highly durable fiberglass-reinforced plastic and finished with glossy urethane paint.

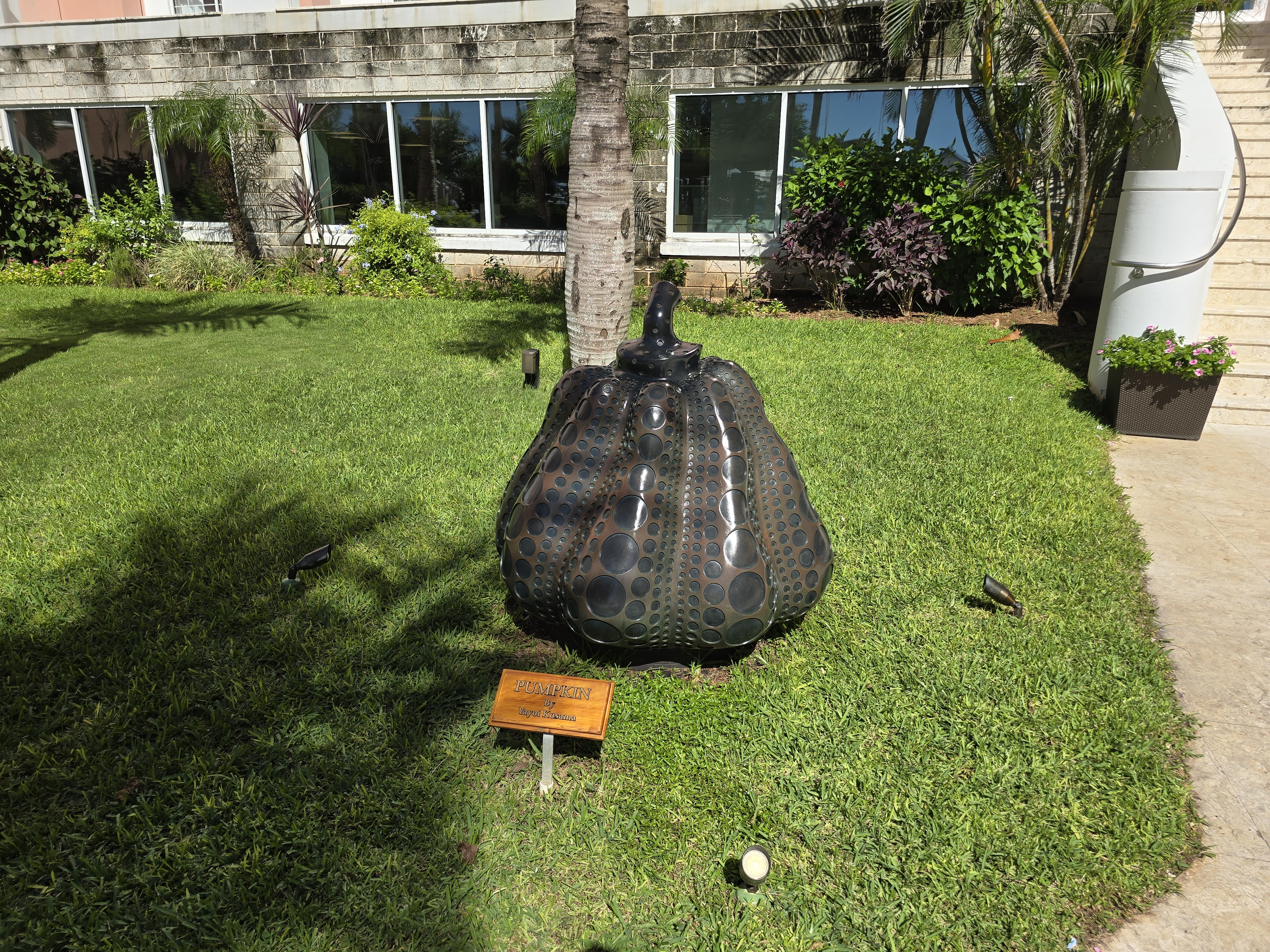
Pumpkin by Yayoi Kusama, Hamilton Princess & Beach Club, Hamilton, Bermuda

In 2010, Kusama designed a Town Sneaker-styled bus, which was titled Mizutama Ranbu (Wild Polka Dot Dance) and whose route travels through Matsumoto. In 2011, she was commissioned to design the front cover of millions of pocket London Underground maps; the result was titled Polka Dots Festival in London (2011). Coinciding with an exhibition at the Whitney Museum of American Art in 2012, a 120-foot (37 m) reproduction of Kusama's painting Yellow Trees (1994) covered a condominium building under construction in New York's Meatpacking District. That same year, Kusama conceived her floor installation Thousands of Eyes as a commission for the new Queen Elizabeth II Courts of Law in Brisbane.

== Selected bibliography ==
=== Authored books ===
- Kusama, Yayoi. A Book of Poems and Paintings. Tokyo: Japan Edition Art, 1977.
- Kusama, Yayoi. Kusama Yayoi: Driving Image = Yayoi Kusama. Tokyo: PARCO shuppan, 1986. ISBN 978-4-891-94130-7 OCLC 54943729
- Kusama, Yayoi, Ralph F. McCarthy, Hisako Ifshin. Violet Obsession: Poems. Berkeley: Wandering Mind Books, 1998. ISBN 978-0-965-33043-5 OCLC 82910478
- Kusama, Yayoi, Ralph F. McCarthy. Hustlers Grotto: Three Novellas. Berkeley, California: Wandering Mind Books, 1998. ISBN 978-0-965-33042-8 OCLC 45665616
- Kusama, Yayoï. Manhattan Suicide Addict. Translated by Isabelle Charrier. Dijon: Presses du Réel, 2005. ISBN 978-2-840-66115-3 OCLC 420073474
- Kusama, Yayoi. Infinity Net: The Autobiography of Yayoi Kusama. Translated by Ralph McCarthy. Chicago: University of Chicago Press, 2011. ISBN 978-0-226-46498-5 OCLC 711050927

=== Exhibition catalogues and monographs ===
- Rodenbeck, J. F. "Yayoi Kusama: Surface, Stitch, Skin". Zegher, M. Catherine de. Inside the Visible: An Elliptical Traverse of 20th Century Art in, of, and from the Feminine. Cambridge, Massachusetts: MIT Press, 1996. ISBN 978-0-262-54081-0 OCLC 33863951
- Kusama, Yayoi, and Damien Hirst. Yayoi Kusama Now. New York: Robert Miller Gallery, 1998. ISBN 978-0-944-68058-2 OCLC 42448762
- Kusama, Yayoi, and Lynn Zelevansky. Love Forever: Yayoi Kusama, 1958–1968. Los Angeles: Los Angeles County Museum of Art, 1998. ISBN 978-0-875-87181-3 OCLC 39030076
- Hoptman, Laura, Akira Tatehata, and Udo Kultermann. Yayoi Kusama. London: Phaidon Press, 2000. ISBN 978-0-714-83920-2 OCLC 749417124
- Kusama, Yayoi. Yayoi Kusama. Vienna: Kunsthalle Wien, 2002. ISBN 978-3-852-47034-4 OCLC 602369060
- Kusama, Yayoi. Kusamatorikkusu = Kusamatrix. Tokyo: Kadokawa Shoten, 2004. ISBN 978-4-048-53741-4 OCLC 169879689
- Kusama, Yayoi, and Tōru Matsumoto. Kusama Yayoi eien no genzai = Yayoi Kusama: eternity-modernity. Tokyo: Bijutsu Shuppansha, 2005. ISBN 978-4-568-10353-3 OCLC 63197423
- Kusama, Yayoi. Kusama Yayoi zen hangashū, 1979–2004 = All Prints of Kusama Yayoi, 1979–2004. Tokyo: Abe Shuppan, 2006. ISBN 978-4-872-42174-3 OCLC 173274568
- Applin, Jo, and Yayoi Kusama. Yayoi Kusama. London: Victoria Miro Gallery, 10 October – 17 November 2007. ISBN 978-0-955-45644-2 OCLC 501970783
- Kusama, Yayoi. Yayoi Kusama. Gagosian Gallery, New York, 16 April – 27 June 2009; Gagosian Gallery, Beverly Hills, 30 May – 17 July 2009. ISBN 978-1-932-59894-0 OCLC 320277816
- Applin, Jo. Yayoi Kusama: Infinity Mirror Room – Phalli's Field. London: Afterall, 2012. ISBN 978-1-846-38091-4
- Morris, Frances, and Jo Applin. Yayoi Kusama. London: Tate Publishing, 2012. ISBN 978-1-854-37939-9 OCLC 781163109
- Kusama, Yayoi, and Akira Tatehata. Yayoi Kusama: I Who Have Arrived in Heaven. New York: David Zwirner, 2014. ISBN 978-0-989-98093-7 OCLC 879584489
- Yoshitake, Mika, Melissa Chiu, Alexander Blair Dumbadze, Alex Jones, Gloria Sutton, and Miwako Tezuka. Yayoi Kusama: Infinity Mirrors. Washington, D.C.: Hirshhorn Museum and Sculpture Garden / Prestel, 2017. ISBN 978-3-7913-5594-8 OCLC 954134388
- Kusama, Yayoi, Laura Hoptman, Akira Tatehata, Udo Kultermann, and Catherine Taft. Yayoi Kusama. London: Phaidon Press, 2017. ISBN 978-0-714-87345-9 OCLC 749417124

=== Book chapters ===
- Nakajima, Izumi. "Yayoi Kusama between abstraction and pathology". In Pollock, Griselda, ed. Psychoanalysis and the Image: Transdisciplinary Perspectives. Malden, Massachusetts: Blackwell Pub, 2006. pp. 127–160. ISBN 978-1-405-13460-6 OCLC 62755557
- Podoll, Klaus. "Die Künstlerin Yayoi Kusama als pathographischer Fall". In Schulz R, Bonanni G, Bormuth M, eds. Wahrheit ist, was uns verbindet: Karl Jaspers' Kunst zu philosophieren. Göttingen, Wallstein, 2009. p. 119. ISBN 978-3-835-30423-9 OCLC 429664716
- Cutler, Jody B. "Narcissus, Narcosis, Neurosis: The Visions of Yayoi Kusama". In Wallace, Isabelle Loring, and Jennie Hirsh. Contemporary Art and Classical Myth. Farnham, Surrey: Ashgate, 2011. pp. 87–109. ISBN 978-0-754-66974-6 OCLC 640515432
- Gipson, Ferren. "Yayoi Kusama". In Women's Work. London: Frances Lincoln, 2022. pp. 75–79. ISBN 978-0-7112-6465-6

=== Illustrated books ===
- Andersen, Hans Christian, and Yayoi Kusama. The Little Mermaid by Hans Christian Andersen & Yayoi Kusama: A Fairy Tale of Infinity and Love Forever. Humlebæk: Louisiana Museum of Modern Art, 2016. ISBN 978-8-792-87759-8 OCLC 957636647
- Carroll, Lewis, and Yayoi Kusama. Lewis Carroll's Alice's Adventures in Wonderland. London: Penguin Classics, 2012. ISBN 978-0-141-19730-2 OCLC 54167867

== Exhibitions ==
In 1959, Kusama had her first solo exhibition in New York at the Brata Gallery, an artist's co-op. She showed a series of white net paintings which were enthusiastically reviewed by Donald Judd (both Judd and Frank Stella then acquired paintings from the show). Kusama also exhibited work with Claes Oldenburg, Andy Warhol, and Jasper Johns, among others. Exhibiting alongside European artists including Lucio Fontana, Pol Bury, Otto Piene, and Günther Uecker, in 1962, she was the only female artist to take part in the widely acclaimed Nul (Zero) international group exhibition at the Stedelijk Museum Amsterdam.

=== Exhibition list ===
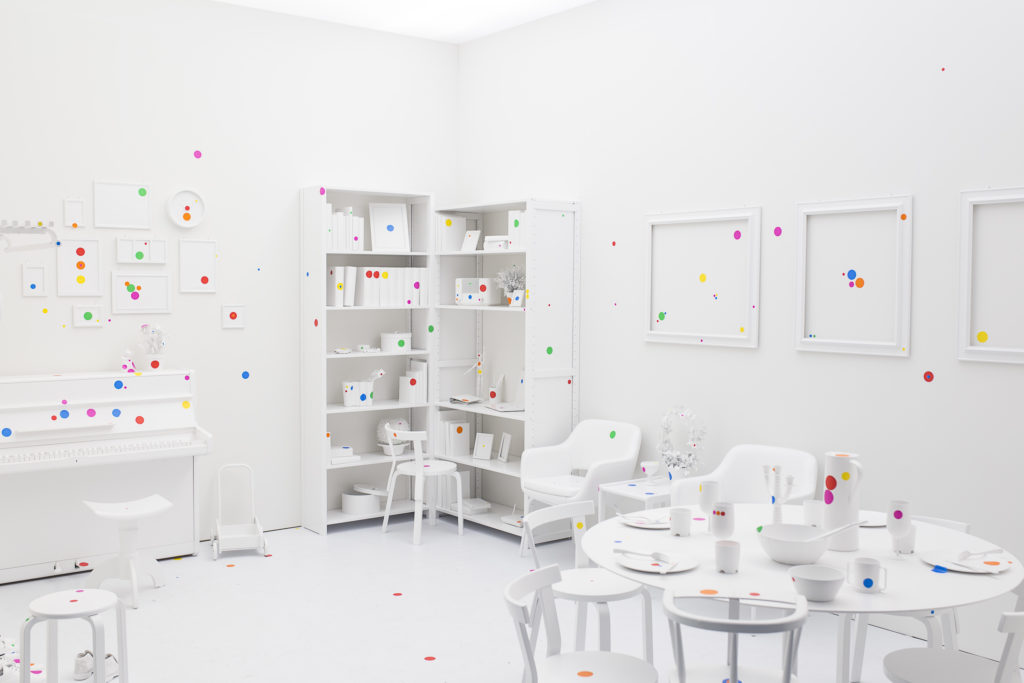
Kusama's Obliteration Room (2015) was inspired by the earlier Infinity Mirror Room.

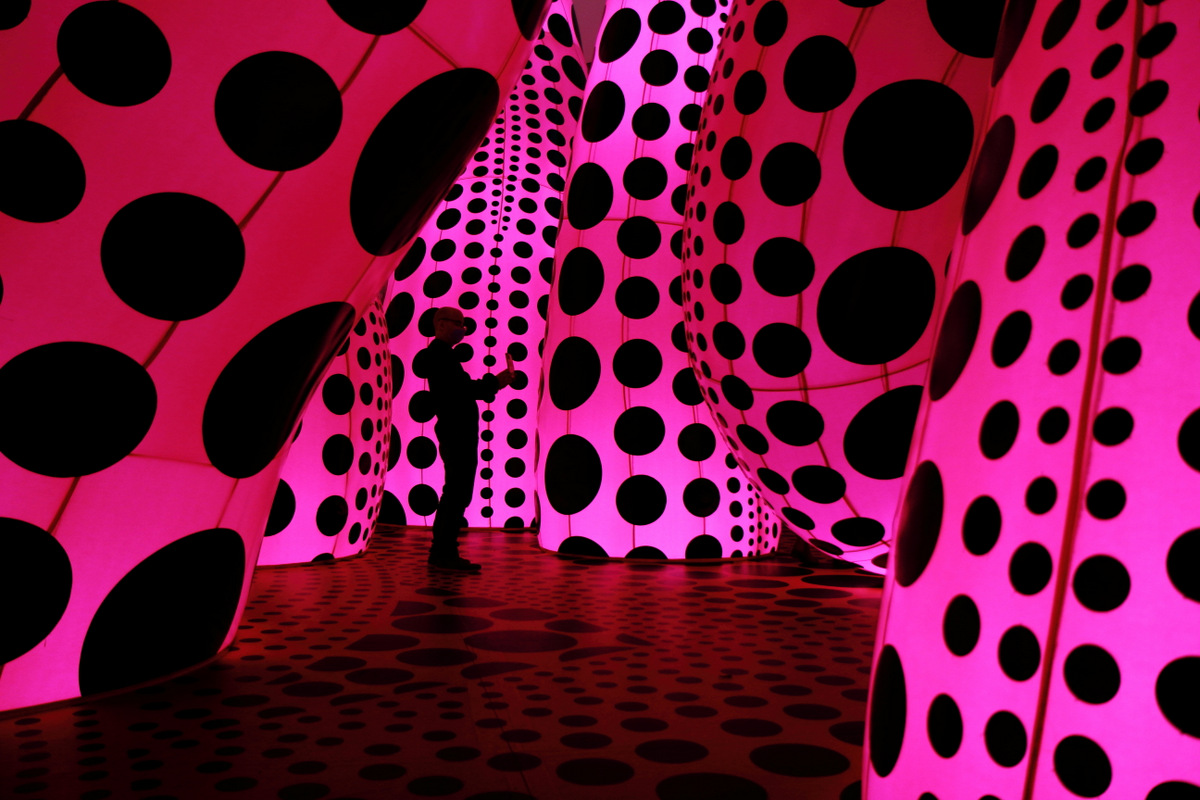
Kusama exhibit at the Tel Aviv Museum of Art (2022)

- 1983: Kusama's Self-Obliteration (Performance), Video Gallery SCAN, Tokyo
- 1987: First major retrospective exhibition, held at the Kitakyushu Municipal Museum of Art
- 1993: Represented Japan at the Venice Biennale
- 1998: Love Forever: Yayoi Kusama, 1958–1968, LACMA
- 1998–1999: Love Forever: Yayoi Kusama, 1958–1968 – exhibition traveled to Museum of Modern Art, New York
- 7 February 2004 – 9 May 2004: Kusamatrix, Mori Art Museum, Tokyo
- 5 June 2004 – 22 August 2004: Kusamatrix traveled to Art Park Museum of Contemporary Art, Sapporo Art Park, Hokkaido
- 26 October 2004 – 19 December 2004: Eternity – Modernity, National Museum of Modern Art, Tokyo
- 2007: FINA Festival 2007. Kusama created Guidepost to the New Space, an outdoor installation for Birrarung Marr beside the Yarra River in Melbourne. In 2009, the Guideposts were re-installed at Fairchild Tropical Botanic Garden, this time displayed as floating "humps" on a lake.
- 10 October 2007 – 17 November 2007: Yayoi Kusama, Victoria Miro Gallery, London
- 24 February 2009 – 8 June 2009: The Mirrored Years traveled to Museum of Contemporary Art in Sydney
- 27 September 2009 – 7 February 2010: The Mirrored Years traveled to City Gallery Wellington
- 2010: Museum Boijmans Van Beuningen purchased the work Infinity Mirror Room – Phalli's Field. The mirror room was permanently installed in the museum's entrance area from 13 September 2010.
- 11 May – 12 September 2011: Yayoi Kusama, Museo Reina Sofía, Madrid
- 9 February – 5 June 2012: Yayoi Kusama, Tate Modern, London. Described as "akin to being suspended in a beautiful cosmos gazing at infinite worlds, or like a tiny dot of fluorescent plankton in an ocean of glowing microscopic life", the retrospective spanned Kusama's entire career.
- 30 June 2013 – 16 September 2013: "Obsesión Infinita" (Infinite Obsession), MALBA, Buenos Aires
- 22 May 2014 – 27 June 2014: Yayoi Kusama: Obsessão Infinita, Instituto Tomie Ohtake, São Paulo
- 7 March 2015 – 7 June 2015: Yayoi Kusama: Obsesión Infinita, Centro de las Artes 660 / CA 660 (Fundación CorpArtes), Las Condes, Santiago, Chile.
- 12 June 2015 – 9 August 2015: Yayoi Kusama: Infinity Theory, Garage Museum of Contemporary Art, Moscow. This was Kusama's first solo exhibition in Russia
- 17 September 2015 – 24 January 2016: In Infinity, Louisiana Museum of Modern Art, Humlebæk
- 19 February 2016 – 15 May 2016: Yayoi Kusama – I uendeligheten, Henie Onstad Kunstsenter, Oslo
- 1 May 2016 – 30 November 2016: Yayoi Kusama: Narcissus Garden, The Glass House, New Canaan, Connecticut
- 25 May 2016 – 30 July 2016: Yayoi Kusama: Sculptures, Paintings & Mirror Rooms, Victoria Miro Gallery, London
- 25 May 2016 – 30 July 2016: Yayoi Kusama: My Eternal Soul, Victoria Miro Gallery, Mayfair
- 12 June 2016 – 18 September 2016: Kusama: At the End of the Universe, Museum of Fine Arts, Houston, Houston, Texas
- 7 October 2016 – 22 January 2017: Yayoi Kusama: In Infinity, organised by the Louisiana Museum of Modern Art in cooperation with Henie Onstad Kunstsenter, Moderna Museet/ArkDes and Helsinki Art Museum in Helsinki
- 5 November 2016 – 17 April 2017: Dot Obsessions – Tasmania, MONA: Museum of Old and New Art, Hobart
- 23 February 2017 – 14 May 2017: Yayoi Kusama: Infinity Mirrors, a traveling museum show originating at the Hirshhorn Museum and Sculpture Garden, Washington, D.C.
- 9 June 2017 – 3 September 2017: Yayoi Kusama: Life is the Heart of a Rainbow, National Gallery Singapore
- 30 June 2017 – 10 September 2017: Yayoi Kusama: Infinity Mirrors, exhibition traveled to Seattle Art Museum
- October 2017 – January 2018: Yayoi Kusama: Infinity Mirrors, exhibition traveled to The Broad, Los Angeles, California
- 1 October 2017 – 29 April 2018: Yayoi Kusama: All the Eternal Love I Have for the Pumpkins, Dallas Museum of Art, Dallas, Texas
- 4 November 2017 – 11 February 2018: Yayoi Kusama: Life is the Heart of a Rainbow and Obliteration Room, Gallery of Modern Art, Brisbane, Brisbane
- 3 March 2018 – 27 May 2018: Yayoi Kusama: Infinity Mirrors, exhibition traveled to Art Gallery of Ontario, Toronto, Ontario
- 3 May 2018 – 28 February 2019: Yayoi Kusama: Infinity Pumpkins, Forever Museum of Contemporary Art, Gion
- 12 May 2018 – 9 September 2018: Yayoi Kusama: Life is the Heart of a Rainbow, Museum of Modern and Contemporary Art in Nusantara, Jakarta
- 5 July 2018 – 28 October 2018: Yayoi Kusama: Where The Lights In My Heart Go, exhibition traveled to DeCordova Sculpture Park and Museum, Lincoln, Massachusetts
- 7 July 2018 – 30 September 2018: Yayoi Kusama: Infinity Mirrors, exhibition traveled to Cleveland Museum of Art, Cleveland, Ohio
- 26 July 2018 – Spring 2019: Yayoi Kusama: With All My Love for the Tulips, I Pray Forever (2011), Marciano Art Foundation, Los Angeles
- 22 March 2019 – 1 September 2019: Yayoi Kusama, Museum Voorlinden, Wassenaar
- 9 November 2019 – 14 December 2019: Yayoi Kusama: Every Day I Pray for Love, David Zwirner Gallery, New York
- 4 January 2020 – 18 March 2020: Brilliance of the Souls, Maraya, AlUla
- 4 April 2020 – 19 September 2020: Yayoi Kusama: One with Eternity: Yayoi Kusama in the Hirshhorn Collection, Washington, DC
- 31 July 2020 – 3 January 2021: Stars: Six Contemporary Artists from Japan to the World, Mori Art Museum, Tokyo
- 10 April 2021 – 31 October 2021: Kusama: Cosmic Nature, New York Botanical Garden, New York
- 23 April 2021 – 15 August 2021: Yayoi Kusama: A Retrospective, Martin-Gropius-Bau, Berlin
- 18 May 2021 – 28 April 2024: Yayoi Kusama: Infinity Mirror Rooms, Tate Modern, London
- 15 November 2021 – 23 April 2022: Yayoi Kusama: A Retrospective, exhibition traveled to Tel Aviv Museum of Art
- 12 November 2022 – 14 May 2023: Yayoi Kusama: 1945 to Now, M+, Hong Kong
- 20 November 2022 – 1 March 2023: Yayoi Kusama: My Soul Blooms Forever, Museum of Islamic Art, Doha
- 11 May 2023 – 21 July 2023: Yayoi Kusama: I Spend Each Day Embracing Flowers, David Zwirner Gallery, New York
- 27 June 2023 – 8 October 2023: Yayoi Kusama: 1945 to Now, exhibition traveled to Guggenheim Museum Bilbao
- 30 June 2023 – 28 August 2023: Yayoi Kusama: You, Me, and the Balloons, Factory International, Manchester
- 14 September 2023 – 5 May 2024: Yayoi Kusama: Infinity Mirrored Room – Let's Survive Forever, 2017, Memorial Art Gallery, Rochester, New York
- 27 March 2024 – 29 September 2024: Yayoi Kusama: 1945 to Now, exhibition traveled to Serralves Museum of Contemporary Art, Porto
- 15 December 2024 – 21 April 2025: Yayoi Kusama, National Gallery of Victoria, Melbourne
- 5 April 2025 – 25 October 2026: Yayoi Kusama: Infinity Mirrored Room – Let's Survive Forever, Art Gallery of Ontario, Toronto, Ontario
- 24 May 2025 – 5 October 2025: Yayoi Kusama: Infinity Mirrored Room – Brilliance of the Souls, Museum MACAN, Jakarta
- 2 October 2025 – 2 March 2026: One with Eternity: Yayoi Kusama, Buffalo AKG Art Museum, Buffalo, New York
- 12 October 2025 – 25 January 2026: Yayoi Kusama, Fondation Beyeler, Riehen
- 14 March 2026 – 2 August 2026, Yayoi Kusama, Museum Ludwig, Cologne
- 11 September 2026 – 17 January 2027, Yayoi Kusama, Stedelijk Museum Amsterdam

=== Permanent Infinity Room installations ===
- Infinity Dots Mirrored Room (1996), Mattress Factory, Pittsburgh, Pennsylvania
- Infinity Mirror Room Fireflies on Water (2000), Musée des Beaux-Arts de Nancy, Nancy
- You Who Are Getting Obliterated in the Dancing Swarm of Fireflies (2005), Phoenix Art Museum, Phoenix, Arizona
- Gleaming Lights of the Souls (2008), Louisiana Museum of Modern Art, Humlebæk, Fredensborg Municipality
- Aftermath of Obliteration of Eternity (2009), Museum of Fine Arts, Houston, Houston, Texas
- The Souls of Millions of Light Years Away (2013), The Broad, Los Angeles, California
- Infinity Dots Mirrored Room (2014), Bonte Museum, Jeju Island, South Korea
- The Spirits of the Pumpkins Descended into the Heavens (2015), National Gallery of Australia, Canberra
- Hymn of Life (2015), Henie Onstad Kunstsenter, Oslo
- Phalli's Field (1965/2016), Museum Boijmans Van Beuningen, Rotterdam
- Love is Calling (2013/2019), Institute of Contemporary Art, Boston
- Light of Life (2018), North Carolina Museum of Art, Raleigh, North Carolina
- Brilliance of the Souls (2019), Museum of Modern and Contemporary Art in Nusantara, Jakarta
- Infinity Mirror Room – Let's Survive Forever (2019), Art Gallery of Ontario, Toronto, Ontario

== Collections ==
Kusama's work is in the collections of museums throughout the world, including the Museum of Modern Art, New York; Los Angeles County Museum of Art, Los Angeles; Walker Art Center, Minneapolis; Phoenix Art Museum, Phoenix; Utah Museum of Fine Arts, Salt Lake City; Tate Modern, London; Louisiana Museum of Modern Art, Humlebæk; Stedelijk Museum Amsterdam; Centre Pompidou, Paris; Art Gallery of Ontario, Toronto; the National Museum of Modern Art, Tokyo; and the Matsumoto City Museum of Art in her hometown, which houses a permanent collection display titled The Place for My Soul.

== Recognition ==
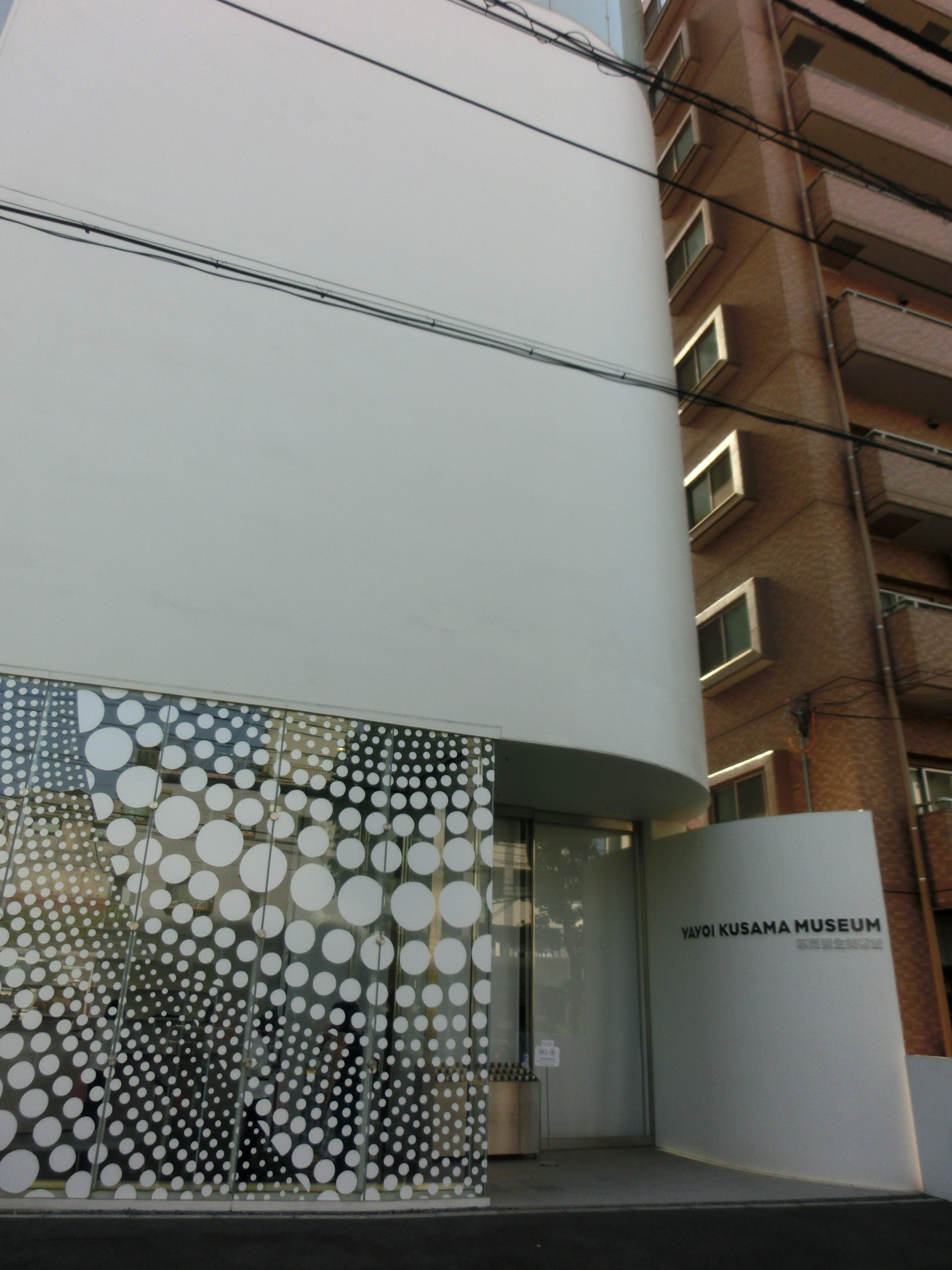
Entrance to the Yayoi Kusama Museum in Tokyo

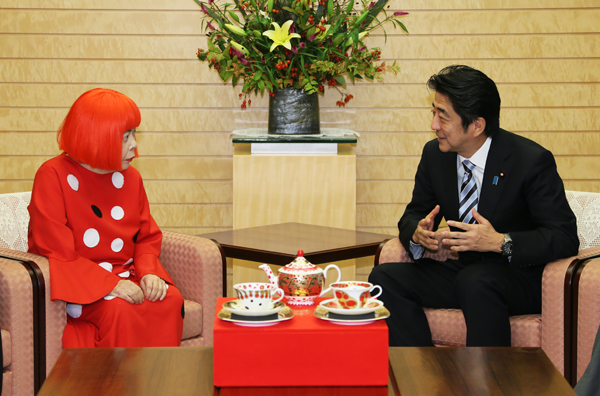
Kusama meeting with Shinzo Abe in 2013

Kusama's image is included in the iconic 1972 poster Some Living American Women Artists by Mary Beth Edelson.

Major retrospectives of her work have been held at the Museum of Modern Art (1998), the Whitney Museum (2012), and the Tate Modern (2012). In 2015, the website Artsy named Kusama one of its top 10 living artists of the year.

Kusama received numerous honors, including the Asahi Prize (2001), the Ordre des Arts et des Lettres (2003), the Order of the Rising Sun, Gold Rays with Rosette (2006), the Women's Caucus for Art Lifetime Achievement Award (2006), the Praemium Imperiale (2006—making her the first Japanese woman to receive the prize), selection as a Person of Cultural Merit (2009), the Ango Award (2014), and the Order of Culture (2016). In 2014, Kusama was ranked the most popular artist of the year after a record-breaking number of visitors flooded her Latin American tour, Yayoi Kusama: Infinite Obsession. Venues from Buenos Aires to Mexico City received more than 8,500 visitors each day.

Kusama gained media attention for partnering with the Hirshhorn Museum and Sculpture Garden to make her 2017 Infinity Mirror rooms accessible to visitors with disabilities or mobility issues; in a new initiative among art museums, the venue mapped out the six individual rooms and provided disabled individuals visiting the exhibition access to a complete 360-degree virtual reality headset that allowed them to experience every aspect of the rooms, as if they were actually walking through them.

In 2018, Hanna Schouwink of David Zwirner Gallery described Kusama as "officially the world's most successful living artist". In 2023, the Asia Society named her an Asia Game Changer honoree for strengthening cultural bonds between Asia and the world.

Between 2012 and 2015, Kusama recorded several filmed interviews with the Louisiana Channel, the digital platform of the Louisiana Museum of Modern Art, including Yayoi Kusama – Earth Is a Polka Dot (2012).

== Art market ==
Kusama's work has performed strongly at auction: top prices for her work are for paintings from the late 1950s and early 1960s. As of 2012, her work had the highest turnover of any living woman artist.

In November 2008, Christie's New York sold a 1959 white Infinity Net painting formerly owned by Donald Judd, No. 2, for US$5.1 million, then a record for a living female artist. By comparison, as of 2007, the highest auction price for a sculpture from her New York years was £72,500 (US$147,687), paid for the 1965 wool, pasta, paint, and hanger assemblage Golden Macaroni Jacket at Sotheby's London in October 2007, while a 2006 fiberglass-reinforced plastic pumpkin fetched US$264,000 at Sotheby's the same year.

Her Flame of Life – Dedicated to Tu-Fu (Du-Fu) sold for US$960,000 at Art Basel/Hong Kong in May 2013, the highest price paid at the show. In November 2014, White No. 28 (1960) from her Infinity Nets series sold for US$7.1 million at Christie's, making Kusama then the most expensive living female artist at auction—a record later surpassed by Marlene Dumas.

On November 16, 2026, Sotheby’s New York sold one of her Infinity Net paintings, No. 3P.B. (1960) for US$12.5 million (US$15.1 million with fees) and was an auction record for Kusama.

== In popular culture ==
- American indie band Superchunk included the song "Art Class (Song for Yayoi Kusama)" on its 2001 album Here's to Shutting Up.
- In 2013, British indie pop duo The Boy Least Likely To released the tribute song "A World of Polka Dots", writing that they admired how Kusama channeled her fears into her art.
- Magnolia Pictures released the biographical documentary by Heather Lenz, Kusama: Infinity, in 2018 and a DVD version in 2019.
- Veuve Clicquot and Kusama created a limited-edition bottle and sculpture in September 2020.
- Cyndi Lauper's 2024 Farewell Tour featured art by Kusama, including white sculptures and walls covered in Kusama's signature red polka dots. Lauper and background performers also dressed in matching white clothes with large red polka dots.
