= The Pitchfork 500 =

2008 music compilation book

The Pitchfork 500: Our Guide to the Greatest Songs from Punk to the Present
- Editors: Scott Plagenhoef; Ryan Schreiber
- Cover artist: Chris Capuozzo (illustration)
- Language: English
- Subject: Music
- Publisher: Fireside Books
- Publication date: 11 November 2008
- Publication place: New York
- Media type: Print (paperback)
- Pages: 208
- ISBN: 978-1-4165-6202-3

The Pitchfork 500: Our Guide to the Greatest Songs from Punk to the Present is a book compiling the greatest songs from 1977 to 2006, published in 2008 by Pitchfork Media. The book focuses on specific genres including indie rock, hip-hop, electronic, pop, metal, and experimental underground. The book is broken down into 9 chronological periods, each period beginning with a description of the music scene before the featured artists, and how those artists changed the music scene. Time described the book as having "42 critics to cover 30 years of music, from 1977 punk to 2006 crunk, and all the starry-eyed, acoustic acts in between."

== Critical reception ==
The book received attention and criticism from mainstream and alternative media. TIME commented that the book's record reviews "have been pleasantly stripped of their supercilious phrases" and that "its tributes to popular songs are exquisite" but concluded, "the project comes off like a personal message that High Fidelity's Rob Gordon might obsessively attach to a mix-tape." The Washington City Paper called it Pitchfork's "boomer-like shot at print-based respectability, a coffee-table book..." Under the Radar gave the book a 7/10 rating, noting that Pitchfork "has emerged as arguably the preeminent music criticism source of its time while fashioning itself into a multimedia powerhouse".

On the other hand, the Houston Press criticized the book for what it saw as its unwarranted disregard for Latin, country, funk, soul, and classic rock, opining that Pitchfork's "school of criticism has always relied more on trendy perceptions than actual musical merit and song structure." And Time Out Chicago called the book "a slow, meandering walk through the arbitrary tastes of the site's editors and authors" and "a wasted opportunity".

== Statistics ==
Prince and Talking Heads had the most songs featured on the list with four each. The Cure, the Clash, New Order, OutKast, Pavement, Pixies, Radiohead, and the Smiths received three spots each. 38 bands and artists had two songs listed. Björk is featured three times: twice in solo work, and once in Icelandic pop group the Sugarcubes. The surviving members of Joy Division have five total when coupled with their work as New Order.

Brian Eno features once as a performer, twice as co-writer (David Bowie's "Heroes" and Talking Heads' "Born Under Punches (The Heat Goes On)"), four times as a producer (Talking Heads' "Memories Can't Wait" and "Born Under Punches", U2's "Bad" and Devo's "Mongoloid"), and two entries are cover versions of his songs (Bauhaus' "Third Uncle" and Uilab's "St. Elmo's Fire").

The 1977–1979 period had the most songs on the list with 66, and 1997–1999 had the fewest with 38.

== 1977–1979 ==
- David Bowie – ""Heroes""
- Iggy Pop – "The Passenger"
- Lou Reed – "Street Hassle"
- Kraftwerk – "Trans-Europe Express"
- Brian Eno – "1/1"
- Ramones – "Rockaway Beach"
- Talking Heads – "Psycho Killer"
- Television – "Marquee Moon"
- Patti Smith – "Rock N Roll Nigger"
- Sex Pistols – "God Save the Queen"
- The Clash – "(White Man) In Hammersmith Palais"
- Buzzcocks – "Ever Fallen in Love (With Someone You Shouldn't've)"
- Vic Godard and the Subway Sect – "Parallel Lines"
- X-Ray Spex – "Oh Bondage Up Yours!"
- The Adverts – "One Chord Wonders"
- Wire – "Ex-Lion Tamer"
- Donna Summer – "I Feel Love"
- Giorgio Moroder – "Chase"
- Chic – "Good Times"
- Thelma Houston – "Don't Leave Me This Way"
- Gloria Gaynor – "I Will Survive"
- Michael Jackson – "Don't Stop 'Til You Get Enough"
- Parliament – "Flash Light"
- Marvin Gaye – "Got to Give It Up"
- Public Image Ltd – "Public Image"
- Gang of Four – "Damaged Goods"
- Magazine – "Shot by Both Sides"
- The Cramps – "Human Fly"
- Misfits – "Night of the Living Dead"
- Wire – "Outdoor Miner"
- Joy Division – "Disorder (song)"
- Althea & Donna – "Uptown Top Ranking"
- Lee Perry – "Roast Fish & Cornbread"
- The Congos – "Fisherman"
- Willi Williams – "Armagideon Time"
- This Heat – "24 Track Loop"
- The Slits – "Typical Girls"
- The Pop Group – "She Is Beyond Good and Evil"
- The Clash – "The Guns of Brixton"
- James Chance and the Contortions – "Contort Yourself"
- Suicide – "Dream Baby Dream"
- Cabaret Voltaire – "Nag Nag Nag"
- Throbbing Gristle – "Hot on the Heels of Love"
- Devo – "Mongoloid"
- Candido – "Jingo"
- Dinosaur – "Kiss Me Again"
- Machine – "There but for the Grace of God Go I"
- Kate Bush – "Wuthering Heights"
- Goblin – "Suspiria"
- Blue Öyster Cult – "(Don't Fear) The Reaper"
- AC/DC – "Highway to Hell"
- Van Halen – "Runnin' with the Devil"
- Fleetwood Mac – "The Chain"
- Steely Dan – "Deacon Blues"
- Electric Light Orchestra – "Mr. Blue Sky"
- The Only Ones – "Another Girl, Another Planet"
- The Undertones – "Teenage Kicks"
- Plastic Bertrand – "Ça plane pour moi"
- The Records – "Starry Eyes"
- Cheap Trick – "Surrender"
- The Cars – "Just What I Needed"
- Elvis Costello and the Attractions – "Radio Radio"
- The Cure – "Boys Don't Cry"
- XTC – "Making Plans for Nigel"
- Blondie – "Atomic"
- Talking Heads – "Memories Can't Wait"

== 1980–1982 ==
- Kurtis Blow – "The Breaks"
- Spoonie Gee Meets The Sequence – "Monster Jam"
- The Sugarhill Gang – "8th Wonder"
- The Treacherous Three – "The New Rap Language"
- The Clash – "The Magnificent Seven"
- Talking Heads – "Born Under Punches (The Heat Goes On)"
- Yoko Ono – "Walking on Thin Ice"
- Klein + M.B.O. – "Dirty Talk"
- ESG – "Moody"
- Grandmaster Flash and the Furious Five – "The Adventures of Grandmaster Flash on the Wheels of Steel"
- Funky 4 + 1 – "That's the Joint"
- Kraftwerk – "Numbers/Computer World 2"
- Afrika Bambaataa and Soulsonic Force – "Planet Rock"
- Grandmaster Flash and the Furious Five – "The Message"
- Glenn Branca – "Lesson No. 1 for Electric Guitar"
- Laurie Anderson – "O Superman (For Massenet)"
- Joy Division – "Atmosphere"
- The Fall – "Totally Wired"
- Elvis Costello and the Attractions – "Beyond Belief (song)"
- The Pretenders – "Back on the Chain Gang"
- The B-52's – "Private Idaho"
- Dexys Midnight Runners – "There, There, My Dear"
- Young Marble Giants – "Final Day"
- Altered Images – "Happy Birthday"
- The Specials – "Ghost Town"
- Robert Wyatt – "Shipbuilding"
- Bauhaus – "Third Uncle"
- Adam and the Ants – "Kings of the Wild Frontier"
- Scritti Politti – "The "Sweetest Girl""
- The Human League – "Don't You Want Me"
- Soft Cell – "Tainted Love"
- The Associates – "Party Fears Two"
- ABC – "All of My Heart"
- New Order – "Temptation"
- The Jam – "Town Called Malice"
- Duran Duran – "The Chauffeur"
- The Beat – "Save It for Later"
- The Go-Go's – "Our Lips Are Sealed"
- Tom Tom Club – "Genius of Love"
- Prince – "Dirty Mind"
- Daryl Hall & John Oates – "I Can't Go for That (No Can Do)"
- Michael Jackson – "Billie Jean"
- ABBA – "The Day Before You Came"
- Roxy Music – "More Than This"
- Queen and David Bowie – "Under Pressure"
- Bruce Springsteen – "Atlantic City"
- Journey – "Don't Stop Believin'"
- Bad Brains – "Pay to Cum"
- Minor Threat – "Minor Threat"
- Dead Kennedys – "Holiday in Cambodia"
- Black Flag – "Rise Above"
- Wipers – "Youth of America"
- Flipper – "Sex Bomb"
- Motörhead – "Ace of Spades"
- Iron Maiden – "Run to the Hills"
- Orange Juice – "Blue Boy"
- Television Personalities – "This Angry Silence"
- The Fall – "The Classical"
- The Clean – "Tally Ho!"
- The Feelies – "The Boy with the Perpetual Nervousness"
- R.E.M. – "Radio Free Europe"
- Violent Femmes – "Blister in the Sun"
- Mission of Burma – "That's When I Reach for My Revolver"

== 1983–1986 ==
- The Smiths – "This Charming Man"
- Sonic Youth – "Death Valley '69"
- Hüsker Dü – "Pink Turns to Blue"
- Meat Puppets – "Plateau"
- The Replacements – "I Will Dare"
- Minutemen – "History Lesson – Part II"
- R.E.M. – "So. Central Rain (I'm Sorry)"
- Echo & the Bunnymen – "The Killing Moon"
- The Cure – "Close to Me"
- Siouxsie and the Banshees – "Cities in Dust"
- Run-DMC – "It's Like That"
- Crash Crew – "On the Radio"
- Rammellzee vs. K-Rob – "Beat Bop"
- Boogie Down Productions – "South Bronx"
- New Order – "Blue Monday"
- Prince and The Revolution – "When Doves Cry"
- Talking Heads – "This Must Be the Place (Naive Melody)"
- Kate Bush – "Running Up That Hill (A Deal with God)"
- U2 – "New Year's Day"
- Simple Minds – "Don't You (Forget About Me)"
- The Replacements – "Bastards of Young"
- The Mekons – "Last Dance"
- Big Black – "Kerosene"
- Scratch Acid – "The Greatest Gift"
- The Jesus and Mary Chain – "Just Like Honey"
- The Smiths – "How Soon Is Now?"
- Cocteau Twins – "Lorelei"
- New Order – "Bizarre Love Triangle"
- Billy Bragg – "A New England"
- Metallica – "Battery (song)"
- Slayer – "Angel of Death"
- Saint Vitus – "Clear Windowpane"
- Einstürzende Neubauten – "Halber Mensch"
- Art of Noise – "Beat Box (Diversion One)"
- Frankie Goes to Hollywood – "Relax"
- Liquid Liquid – "Optimo"
- Alexander Robotnick – "Problèmes d'Amour"
- Shannon – "Let the Music Play"
- Section 25 – "Looking from a Hilltop (Restructure)"
- Madonna – "Holiday"
- Cyndi Lauper – "Girls Just Want to Have Fun"
- Prince and The Revolution – "Kiss"
- Run-DMC – "Rock Box"
- LL Cool J – "I Can't Live Without My Radio"
- Beastie Boys – "No Sleep till Brooklyn"
- Mantronix – "Needle to the Groove"
- The Go-Betweens – "Cattle and Cane"
- The Chills – "Pink Frost"
- Felt – "Primitive Painters"
- The Smiths – "There Is a Light That Never Goes Out"
- Tom Waits – "Jockey Full of Bourbon"
- Bruce Springsteen – "I'm on Fire"
- Scott Walker – "Rawhide"
- U2 – "Bad"
- Don Henley – "The Boys of Summer"
- Paul Simon – "Graceland"
- Wayne Smith – "Under Me Sleng Teng"
- Anthony Red Rose – "Tempo"
- Model 500 – "No UFO's"

== 1987–1990 ==
- Mr. Fingers – "Can You Feel It"
- Rhythim Is Rhythim – "Strings of Life"
- A Guy Called Gerald – "Voodoo Ray"
- MARRS – "Pump Up the Volume"
- My Bloody Valentine – "You Made Me Realise"
- Spacemen 3 – "Walkin' with Jesus"
- Ride – "Dreams Burn Down"
- Galaxie 500 – "Blue Thunder"
- Happy Mondays – "Kinky Afro"
- The Stone Roses – "She Bangs the Drums"
- Sonic Youth – "Teen Age Riot"
- Dinosaur Jr. – "Freak Scene"
- Butthole Surfers – "Human Cannonball"
- Pixies – "Where Is My Mind?"
- Fugazi – "Waiting Room"
- Audio Two – "Top Billin'"
- Eric B. & Rakim – "I Know You Got Soul"
- Public Enemy – "Rebel Without a Pause"
- N.W.A – "Straight Outta Compton"
- Nick Cave and the Bad Seeds – "The Mercy Seat"
- Ministry – "Stigmata"
- The Jesus and Mary Chain – "Head On"
- The Sugarcubes – "Birthday"
- The Cure – "Just Like Heaven"
- Morrissey – "Everyday Is Like Sunday"
- The Pogues – "Fairytale of New York"
- The Wedding Present – "My Favourite Dress"
- The Field Mice – "Emma's House"
- Another Sunny Day – "You Should All Be Murdered"
- The Dead Milkmen – "Punk Rock Girl"
- The Primitives – "Crash"
- The La's – "There She Goes"
- They Might Be Giants – "Birdhouse in Your Soul"
- Superchunk – "Slack Motherfucker"
- Fugazi – "Merchandise"
- The Jesus Lizard – "Mouth Breather"
- Slick Rick – "Children's Story"
- Gang Starr – "Just to Get a Rep"
- Rob Base and DJ E-Z Rock – "It Takes Two"
- Salt-N-Pepa – "Push It"
- Beastie Boys – "Hey Ladies"
- De La Soul – "Me Myself and I"
- Biz Markie – "Just a Friend"
- Public Enemy – "Fight the Power"
- Guns N' Roses – "Welcome to the Jungle"
- Swans – "Beautiful Child"
- John Zorn – "The Sicilian Clan"
- Prince – "If I Was Your Girlfriend"
- Madonna – "Like a Prayer"
- Deee-Lite – "Groove Is in the Heart"
- Pet Shop Boys – "Being Boring"
- Sinéad O'Connor – "Nothing Compares 2 U"
- The Orb – "Little Fluffy Clouds"
- The KLF – "Wichita Lineman Was a Song I Once Heard"
- 808 State – "Pacific State"
- Orbital – "Chime"
- Depeche Mode – "Enjoy the Silence"
- My Bloody Valentine – "Soon"
- The Vaselines – "Son of a Gun"
- Beat Happening – "Indian Summer"
- Daniel Johnston – "Some Things Last a Long Time"
- Mudhoney – "Touch Me I'm Sick"
- Pixies – "Wave of Mutilation"

== 1991–1993 ==
- Nirvana – "Smells Like Teen Spirit"
- Pavement – "Summer Babe"
- Archers of Loaf – "Web in Front"
- Yo La Tengo – "From a Motel 6"
- Sebadoh – "The Freed Pig"
- A Tribe Called Quest – "Check the Rhime"
- De La Soul – "A Roller Skating Jam Named "Saturdays""
- Black Sheep – "The Choice Is Yours"
- Massive Attack – "Unfinished Sympathy"
- Tricky – "Aftermath (Version 1)"
- Primal Scream – "Higher Than the Sun"
- Spiritualized – "Step into the Breeze"
- Slowdive – "Alison"
- Aphex Twin – "Xtal"
- Talk Talk – "Ascension Day"
- Slint – "Good Morning, Captain"
- Disco Inferno – "The Last Dance"
- Stereolab – "French Disko"
- Acen – "Trip II the Moon (Part 1)" / "Trip II the Moon (Part 2)"
- The Future Sound of London – "Papua New Guinea"
- Human Resource – "Dominator (Joey Beltram Mix)"
- Metalheadz – "Terminator"
- Omni Trio – "Renegade Snares"
- Red House Painters – "New Jersey"
- Teenage Fanclub – "The Concept (song)"
- Heavenly – "C Is the Heavenly Option"
- Tindersticks – "City Sickness"
- Unrest – "Make Out Club"
- Tenor Saw and Buju Banton – "Ring the Alarm Quick"
- Dr. Dre – "Nuthin' but a 'G' Thang"
- Ice Cube – "It Was a Good Day"
- 2Pac – "I Get Around"
- Souls of Mischief – "93 'til Infinity (song)"
- Suede – "The Drowners"
- Blur – "For Tomorrow"
- Elastica – "Stutter"
- Ween – "Dr. Rock"
- Wu-Tang Clan – "Protect Ya Neck"
- Geto Boys – "Mind Playing Tricks on Me"
- Pete Rock & CL Smooth – "They Reminisce Over You (T.R.O.Y.)"
- Bikini Kill – "Rebel Girl"
- Melvins – "Hooch"
- Dinosaur Jr. – "Start Choppin"
- Pixies – "U-Mass"
- Liz Phair – "Divorce Song"
- PJ Harvey – "Rid of Me"
- The Afghan Whigs – "Debonair"
- Rage Against the Machine – "Killing in the Name"
- The Lemonheads – "It's a Shame About Ray (song)"
- Beck – "Loser"
- The Breeders – "Cannonball"
- Nirvana – "Scentless Apprentice"

== 1994–1996 ==
- Hole – "Violet"
- The Smashing Pumpkins – "1979"
- Green Day – "Longview"
- Weezer – "Say It Ain't So"
- Blur – "Girls & Boys"
- Oasis – "Live Forever"
- Pulp – "Common People"
- The Notorious B.I.G. – "Juicy"
- Nas – "It Ain't Hard to Tell"
- Mobb Deep – "Shook Ones (Part II)"
- GZA – "4th Chamber"
- Pavement – "Gold Soundz"
- Built to Spill – "Car"
- Modest Mouse – "Broke"
- Frank Black – "Headache"
- The Jon Spencer Blues Explosion – "Bellbottoms"
- Guided by Voices – "I Am a Scientist"
- Nine Inch Nails – "Closer"
- Björk – "Hyperballad"
- Beck – "Devils Haircut"
- Portishead – "Sour Times"
- Saint Etienne – "Like a Motorway"
- Basic Channel – "Octagon"
- Paperclip People – "Throw"
- DJ Shadow – "Midnight in a Perfect World"
- Dr. Octagon – "Blue Flowers"
- Common – "I Used to Love H.E.R."
- Jeff Buckley – "Grace"
- Mazzy Star – "Fade into You"
- Arthur Russell – "This Is How We Walk on the Moon"
- Low – "Words"
- The Auteurs – "Unsolved Child Murder"
- Jawbox – "Savory"
- Drive Like Jehu – "Luau"
- Brainiac – "Pussyfootin'"
- Napalm Death – "Twist the Knife (Slowly)"
- Darkthrone – "En ås i dype skogen"
- Ol' Dirty Bastard – "Brooklyn Zoo"
- Snoop Doggy Dogg – "Gin and Juice"
- Luniz – "I Got 5 on It"
- Cutty Ranks – "Limb by Limb"
- The Prodigy – "No Good (Start the Dance)"
- Underworld – "Born Slippy .NUXX"
- The Chemical Brothers – "Setting Sun"
- Daft Punk – "Da Funk"
- Belle and Sebastian – "The State I Am In"
- Elliott Smith – "Needle in the Hay"
- The Magnetic Fields – "Take Ecstasy with Me"
- Palace Music – "New Partner"
- Arab Strap – "The First Big Weekend"
- Tortoise – "Gamera"
- The Sea and Cake – "Parasol"
- Pavement – "Rattled by the Rush"
- Guided by Voices – "Game of Pricks"
- Weezer – "El Scorcho"

== 1997–1999 ==
- Radiohead – "Paranoid Android"
- Björk – "Jóga"
- The Verve – "Bitter Sweet Symphony"
- Elliott Smith – "Between the Bars"
- Cat Power – "Cross Bones Style"
- The Clientele – "Reflections After Jane"
- Bonnie "Prince" Billy – "I See a Darkness"
- Smog – "Teenage Spaceship"
- Silver Jews – "Random Rules"
- Autechre – "Arch Carrier"
- Boards of Canada – "Happy Cycling"
- Herbert – "So Now"
- Aphex Twin – "Windowlicker"
- Uilab – "St. Elmo's Fire"
- Air – "Le soleil est près de moi"
- Massive Attack – "Teardrop"
- Black Star – "Respiration"
- The Notorious B.I.G. – "Hypnotize"
- OutKast – "Spottieottiedopaliscious"
- The Roots – "The Next Movement"
- The Flaming Lips – "Waitin' for a Superman"
- The Beta Band – "Dry the Rain"
- The Olivia Tremor Control – "Hideaway"
- Neutral Milk Hotel – "Holland, 1945"
- Super Furry Animals – "Ice Hockey Hair"
- Stardust – "Music Sounds Better with You"
- Basement Jaxx – "Jump n' Shout"
- Wilco – "Via Chicago"
- Pulp – "This Is Hardcore"
- Belle and Sebastian – "Lazy Line Painter Jane"
- Yo La Tengo – "Autumn Sweater"
- Sleater-Kinney – "One More Hour"
- Refused – "New Noise"
- The Dismemberment Plan – "The City"
- Boredoms – "Super Shine"
- Mogwai – "Like Herod"
- Jim O'Rourke – "Halfway to a Threeway"
- Sigur Rós – "Svefn-g-englar"

== 2000–2002 ==
- Daft Punk – "One More Time"
- Radiohead – "Idioteque"
- Godspeed You! Black Emperor – "Storm"
- The Avalanches – "Since I Left You"
- Broadcast – "Come On Let's Go"
- Aaliyah – "Try Again"
- Justin Timberlake – "Cry Me a River"
- Luomo – "Tessio"
- Vitalic – "La Rock 01"
- Kylie Minogue – "Love at First Sight"
- Jay-Z – "Big Pimpin'"
- Outkast – "B.O.B"
- Eminem – "The Real Slim Shady"
- Ghostface Killah – "Nutmeg"
- Missy Elliott – "Get Ur Freak On"
- The White Stripes – "Dead Leaves and the Dirty Ground"
- The Strokes – "The Modern Age" (single version)
- ...And You Will Know Us by the Trail of Dead – "Another Morning Stoner"
- Interpol – "Obstacle 1"
- Electric Six – "Danger! High Voltage"
- Golden Boy with Miss Kittin – "Rippin Kittin"
- Jürgen Paape – "So Weit Wie Noch Nie"
- Osymyso – "Intro-Inspection"
- The Knife – "Heartbeats"
- LCD Soundsystem – "Losing My Edge"
- The Rapture – "House of Jealous Lovers"
- The Streets – "Weak Become Heroes"
- Aesop Rock – "Daylight"
- RJD2 – "Good Times Roll Pt. 2"
- Bright Eyes – "The Calendar Hung Itself..."
- Wilco – "Poor Places"
- Queens of the Stone Age – "No One Knows"
- My Morning Jacket – "The Way That He Sings"
- Modest Mouse – "3rd Planet"
- Clinic – "Distortions"
- Shellac – "Prayer to God"
- Mclusky – "To Hell with Good Intentions"
- Lightning Bolt – "Ride the Sky"
- The Microphones – "The Moon"
- The New Pornographers – "Letter from an Occupant"
- The Shins – "New Slang"
- The Decemberists – "Here I Dreamt I Was an Architect"
- Radiohead – "Life in a Glasshouse"
- Broken Social Scene – "Cause = Time"
- Deerhoof – "This Magnificent Bird Will Rise"
- Spoon – "The Way We Get By"
- Dizzee Rascal – "I Luv U"
- M.O.P. – "Ante Up"
- Clipse – "Grindin'"
- Talib Kweli – "Get By"
- Jay-Z – "Takeover"

== 2003–2006 ==
- Outkast – "Hey Ya!"
- Kanye West – "Through the Wire"
- R. Kelly – "Ignition (Remix)"
- Beyoncé – "Crazy in Love"
- Gnarls Barkley – "Crazy"
- !!! – "Me and Giuliani Down by the School Yard (A True Story)"
- TV on the Radio – "Staring at the Sun"
- Yeah Yeah Yeahs – "Maps"
- The Walkmen – "The Rat"
- Devendra Banhart – "A Sight to Behold"
- Joanna Newsom – "Peach, Plum, Pear"
- Sufjan Stevens – "Casimir Pulaski Day"
- Antony and the Johnsons – "Hope There's Someone"
- Animal Collective – "Leaf House"
- The Books – "Take Time"
- M83 – "Don't Save Us from the Flames"
- The Postal Service – "Such Great Heights"
- Annie – "Heartbeat"
- M.I.A. – "Galang"
- The White Stripes – "Seven Nation Army"
- Franz Ferdinand – "Take Me Out"
- The Fiery Furnaces – "Here Comes the Summer"
- The Mountain Goats – "No Children"
- The Wrens – "She Sends Kisses"
- Les Savy Fav – "The Sweat Descends"
- Ted Leo and the Pharmacists – "Where Have All the Rude Boys Gone?"
- The Exploding Hearts – "Modern Kicks"
- Art Brut – "Formed a Band"
- Boris – "Farewell"
- Mastodon – "Sleeping Giant"
- Madvillain – "America's Most Blunted"
- T.I. – "What You Know"
- Kelly Clarkson – "Since U Been Gone"
- Amerie – "1 Thing"
- Ciara – "Oh"
- The Go! Team – "The Power Is On"
- Feist – "Mushaboom"
- Arcade Fire – "Neighborhood #1 (Tunnels)"
- Wolf Parade – "I'll Believe in Anything"
- Band of Horses – "The Funeral"
- The Hold Steady – "Stuck Between Stations"
- Beirut – "Postcards from Italy"
- Johnny Boy – "You Are the Generation That Bought More Shoes and You Get What You Deserve"
- Love Is All – "Busy Doing Nothing"
- Jens Lekman – "Black Cab"
- Christian Falk – "Dream On"
- Peter Bjorn and John – "Young Folks"
- Justice vs. Simian – "We Are Your Friends"
- Hot Chip – "Boy from School"
- Animal Collective – "Grass"
- Black Dice – "Cone Toaster"
- Liars – "The Other Side of Mt. Heart Attack"
- Panda Bear – "Bros"
