= The Ascension (Glenn Branca album) =

Studio album by Glenn Branca
- Released: November 1981
- Genres: No wave; totalism; noise rock; post-rock
- Length: 42:17
- Label: 99
- Producer: Ed Bahlman

Glenn Branca chronology
Lesson No. 1 (1980)	The Ascension (1981)	Indeterminate Activity of Resultant Masses (2007)

The Ascension is the debut studio album by the American composer Glenn Branca, released in November 1981 by 99 Records. The album experiments with resonances generated by alternate tunings for multiple electric guitars. It sold over 10,000 copies and received acclaim from music critics.

== Background ==
Branca wanted to explore the resonances generated when guitar strings tuned to the same note were played at high volumes. He assembled the Ascension Band with four electric guitarists, one bassist, and one drummer. The group included guitarist Lee Ranaldo, who later joined alternative rock band Sonic Youth. The group's bass player knew the owner and engineers at the Power Station studio in Manhattan, so they were able to use it at little cost. They recorded five pieces in between tours for Branca's debut EP Lesson No. 1. "The Spectacular Commodity" was written before the songs on Lesson No. 1, originating as a dance piece for Branca's band the Static.

The album's title was chosen as a continuation of works by Olivier Messiaen (L'Ascension) and John Coltrane (Ascension). Its black-and-white cover artwork is by painter Robert Longo. It comes from Longo's "Men in the Cities" series, which depicts well-dressed young professionals in contorted poses. The cover shows Branca in a suit, dragging the dead body of another man, artist and musician Frank Schroder, member of the No Wave noise music band Youth in Asia. Branca has stated that he wanted to show two men having sex; instead, he asked Longo to "make an implication of this."

== Songs ==
"The Ascension"
The album uses multiple guitars with heavy feedback. In some sections, the overtones produce ringing sounds similar to bells.

Opening track "Lesson No. 2" starts with a bass riff. It builds with toms and four guitars, amplified with buzzing feedback. It devolves into a drumbeat with dissonant blasts of guitar. "The Spectacular Commodity" takes its name from Situationist theory. The song moves through various tempi with three guitars playing in different octaves, bass, and drums. The climax occurs nine minutes into the track, as one guitar plays high open chords and the other two act as accompaniment. "Structure" is built around repeated harmonics.

"Light Fields (In Consonance)" begins by constructing rhythms out of one-note patterns. Toward its conclusion, the figures begin ascending into octave scales. The title track uses the overtones from excessive guitar feedback. They form a dense, chaotic soundscape that continually rises.

== Critical reception ==
Professional ratings
Review scores
Source	Rating
AllMusic	4.5/5 stars
Blender	4/5 stars
Mojo	4/5 stars
Muzik	4/5
NME	9/10
Pitchfork	10/10
Sounds	5/5 stars
Spin Alternative Record Guide	8/10
Uncut	5/5 stars
The Village Voice	B

Upon its initial release, The Ascension received positive reviews from music critics. In a review for The New York Times, John Rockwell wrote that The Ascension did a better job than Lesson No. 1 of capturing the impact of Branca's live concerts, but that "his work may be too grand and loud ever to be captured on disk." The New York Times ranked the album sixth on its list of the best albums of 1981. Kristine McKenna wrote in the Los Angeles Times that the album "does a surprisingly good job of conveying the awesome power of his live performance…[it] lacks the glorious dimension of Branca's live show, but is good enough to serve as an introduction to a major new talent." Village Voice writer Robert Christgau described the album as "great sonically" but continued that "the beat's overstated and the sense of structure (i.e. climax) mired in nineteenth-century corn." In the 1981 Pazz & Jop list, compiled by Christgau based on a survey of several hundred critics, The Ascension placed 51st.

Since its original release, the album has garnered critical acclaim. Pitchfork awarded it a perfect 10 score. XLR8R commented that "if these recordings pale in comparison to the live experience, [they] are no less rapturous for it." AllMusic called it "one of the greatest rock albums ever made", adding that its "sonic experimentation" was more in the tradition of avant-garde musicians La Monte Young and Phill Niblock. Tiny Mix Tapes said that the album diverges from punk and classical traditions "as simply essential 20th-century music." Fact magazine ranked The Ascension 18th on its list of the best albums of the 1980s.

== Release and impact ==
The Ascension was released through Ed Bahlman's label 99 Records. Bahlman sold over 10,000 copies out of his shop on MacDougal Street in Manhattan, New York, and the vinyl copies became a rare collector's item. Although the album was successful for an independent release, it did not receive any interest from major labels. New Tone Records re-released the album on CD in 1999, and Acute Records re-released it in 2003 with old footage of Branca performing in the apartment of his Theoretical Girls bandmate Jeffrey Lohn. The Ascension has remained Branca's most popular album. Branca released a sequel titled The Ascension: The Sequel in 2010. To do so, he re-established Neutral Records under its original name Systems Neutralizers.

The Ascension influenced the work of Sonic Youth and Swans. Kurt Kellison encountered the album in 1984 and said, "I haven't thought about music the same way ever since." After founding Atavistic Records, Kellison released some of Branca's later guitar symphonies. In 2003, David Bowie included it in a list of 25 of his favourite albums, "Confessions of a Vinyl Junkie", saying that "over the years, Branca got even louder and more complex than this, but here on the title track his manifesto is already complete."

== Track listing ==
All tracks are written by Glenn Branca, except where noted.

Side one
No.	Title	Writer(s)	Length
1.	"Lesson No. 2"	Glenn Branca, Jeffrey Glenn, Stephan Wischerth	4:59
2.	"The Spectacular Commodity"		12:41
3.	"Structure"		3:00

Side two
No.	Title	Length
1.	"Light Field (In Consonance)"	8:17
2.	"The Ascension"	13:10

== Personnel ==
- Glenn Branca – electric guitar
- Ned Sublette – electric guitar
- David Rosenbloom – electric guitar
- Lee Ranaldo – electric guitar
- Jeffrey Glenn – bass guitar
- Stephan Wischerth – drums
- Ed Bahlman – producer
- James Farber – recording, mixing engineer
- Howie Weinberg – master engineer
