= Noise Fest =

- Noise Fest (1981) 90 min cassette, ZG Music, cover by Barbara Ess
- Genre: Experimental music, no wave noise music
- Dates: June 1981
- Location: New York City art space White Columns
- Founders: Thurston Moore, Kim Gordon, Josh Baer

Noise Fest was an influential festival of no wave noise music performances curated by Thurston Moore of Sonic Youth at the New York City art space White Columns. It ran from June 16th to June 24th, 1981. Sonic Youth made their first live appearances at this show.

Noise Fest Poster

In mid 1981 Kim Gordon and Josh Baer (the then director of White Columns) convinced Thurston Moore to organize this nine-day noise music festival to accommodate underemployed experimental performers in the downtown post-punk scene. The festival was held in the White Columns art gallery, which had a capacity of around sixty people.

Each night three to five acts performed, including Rhys Chatham, Glenn Branca, Ut, Dog Eat Dog (Soody Sisco, Martha Fiskin and Linda Pitt), Jeffrey Lohn (post-Theoretical Girls), Y Pants, Mofungo, EQ'D (Leslie Edge, Machiko Ichihara, John Mastracchio and Dan Witz), Built on Guilt (Robert Longo, Jeffrey Glenn, Karol Hogloff and Brian Hudson), Rudolph Grey, Avant Squares (Barbara Barg, Joe Chassler and Mike Sappol), Off Beach (Angela Babbit, Fritz Van Orden, Ian Peru, Joe Dizney, Kurt Hoffman and Michael Brown), solo guitar by Lee Ranaldo, Jules Baptiste's Red Decade, Khmer Rouge (Phil Shoenfelt), Don King (Don Burg, Donald Lindsay and Marc Cunningham), Robin Crutchfield's Dark Day, Glorious Strangers (Wharton Tiers and Carol Tiers), painter Dan Asher as Economic Animal, IMA (Andy Blinx and Don Hunerberg), NNB, Ad Hoc Rock (Bill Bucher, David Garland, Mark Abbott and Nigel Rollings), Smoking Section (Daniel Diaz, Jeffrey Glenn, Bill Obrecht, Richard Prior, David Rosenberg and Eris Thoren), Chinese Puzzle (David Hofstra, John Mernit and David Rosenbloom), The Problem (Andrea Tienan, Myra Holder, Nancy Heidel and Soos Haglof), Avoidance Behavior (Lee Ranaldo and David Linton), and an early version of Sonic Youth with Anne DeMarinis, Kim Gordon, Richard Smith and Thurston Moore.

== Art Exhibition ==
Noise Fest was presented within the context of an art exhibition of the same name curated by Kim Gordon and Josh Baer that also ran from June 16th to June 24th, 1981. Visual artists/musicians in the exhibition included Ikue Mori (of DNA), Richard McGuire (of Liquid Liquid), Robert Longo, Alan Vega (of Suicide), Lee Ranaldo, Nina Canal (of Ut), Kim Gordon (of Sonic Youth), Linda Pitt and Martha Fishkin (of Dog Eat Dog), Barbara Ess and Virge Piersol (of Y Pants), Glenn Branca and Bill Komoski.

== Recording history ==
In 1978 a similar series of punk rock influenced loud noise music mixed with performance art was held at New York’s Artists Space that led to the Brian Eno-produced no wave scene recording No New York. This recording was seen by many as the first attempt to define the no wave sound, as it documented The Contortions, Teenage Jesus and the Jerks, Mars and DNA.

Music from the Noise Festival (a.k.a. Noise Fest) was first released on December 15th, 1981 as a 90 minute audio cassette titled Noise Fest on ZG Music; the music label of the legendary ZG magazine organized by Rosetta Brookes. All material was recorded live at White Columns. This included the music of Ut, Lee Ranaldo, Mofungo, Khmer Rouge, The Problem, Smoking Section, Sonic Youth, Jeff Lohn (of the Theoretical Girls), Jules Baptiste's Red Decade, EQ'D, Avant Squares, Don King, Primitives, Ad Hoc Rock, Y Pants, John Rehnberger, Off Beach, Barbotemagus (as it is misspelled on the cover), Economical Animal, Chinese Puzzle, Glorious Strangers, Built On Guilt, Oma Fakir, and Lampshades. The Executive-Producer of the cassette was Joshua Baer. The cassette cover design was created by artist/musician Barbara Ess.

== Influence ==
Noise Fest inspired the Speed Trials noise rock series organized by Live Skull members in May 1983 at White Columns. Among an art installation created by David Wojnarowicz and Joseph Nechvatal, various performance artists such as Ilona Granet and Emily XYZ did their acts intermixing with the music of The Fall, Beastie Boys, Live Skull, Sonic Youth, Lydia Lunch, Elliott Sharp, Swans and Arto Lindsay.

Speed Trials was eventually released as a live album recorded by Mark Roule and became one of the best-selling independent music records of its time.

== Discography ==
- Noise Fest (1981) cassette tape, ZG Music
- Noise Festival Tape (1982) TSoWC White Columns
- Speed Trials (1984) Homestead Records HMS-011

== See also ==
- Cassette culture
- List of experimental music festivals
- List of noise musicians
- Post-punk
- Noise music
