= Lesson No. 1 =

EP by Glenn Branca
- Released: March 1980
- Genre: No wave, noise rock
- Length: 19:54 (original); 36:18 (reissue)
- Label: 99

Glenn Branca chronology
Lesson No. 1 (1980)	The Ascension (1981)

Lesson No. 1 is the debut solo EP by American avant-garde musician Glenn Branca. It was released in March 1980 on 99 Records.

It was originally released on 12" vinyl, as 99 Records' first release. The EP was remastered and re-released in 2004 by Acute Records. The re-release includes the bonus track "Bad Smells". In 2014, Superior Viaduct re-released Lesson No. 1 in its original 12" vinyl format as a double LP with "Bad Smells".

== History ==
In the late 1970s, Branca was a member of no wave band Theoretical Girls. While he was out of town touring with the Static, Max's Kansas City invited Theoretical Girls to perform for a 1979 Easter festival. Branca convinced the venue to book him for a solo gig, and he assembled a group that included Barbara Ess and Christine Hahn. The group performed "Instrumental for Six Guitars", and its sound convinced Branca to continue composing for multiple guitars. He began performing solo at rock clubs and avant-garde venues such as The Kitchen. Branca "wanted to make sure [his music] was understood as rock and nothing else."

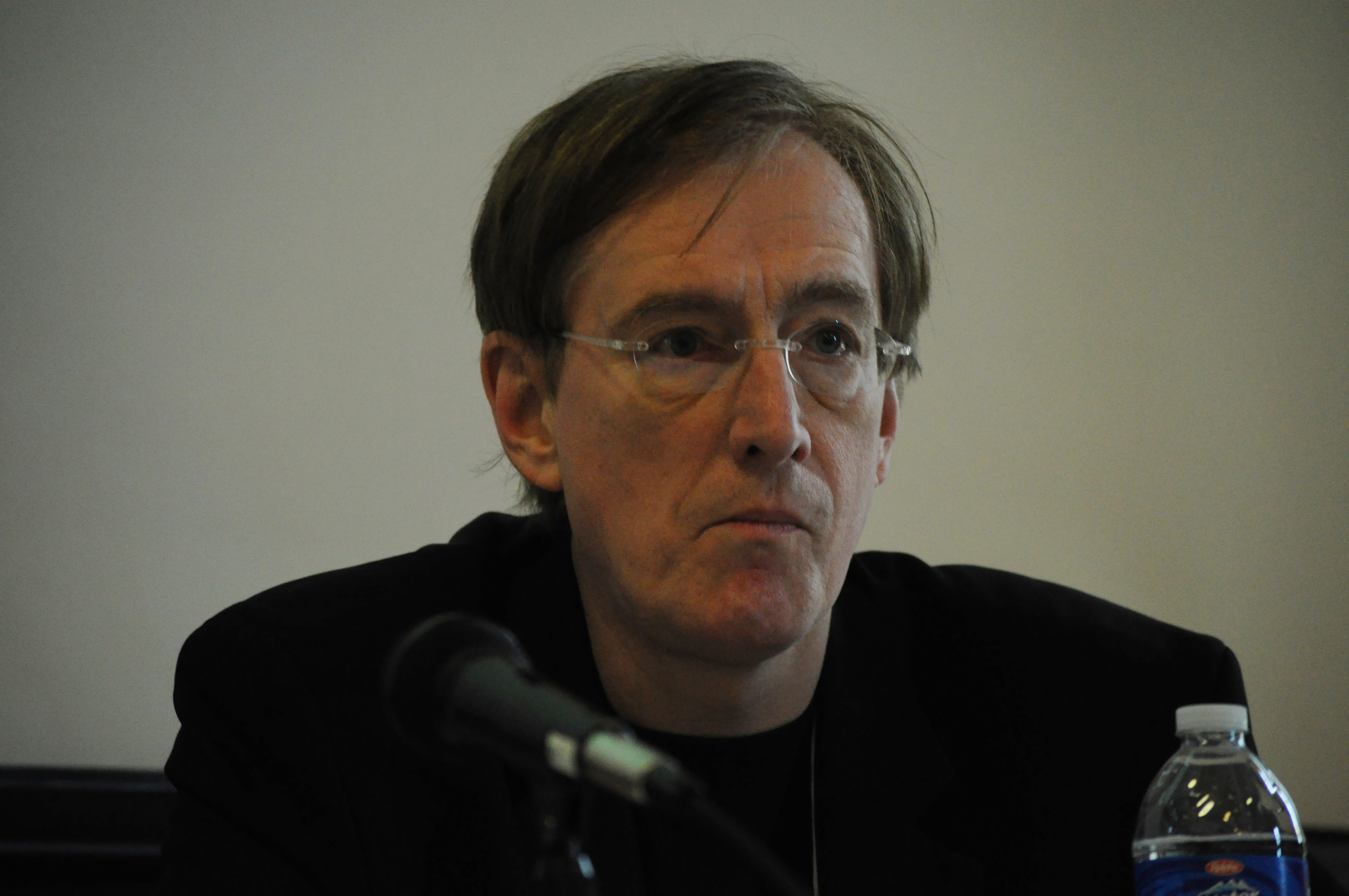
Composer Ned Sublette plays guitar on the EP and joined Branca's touring band.

Branca knew Ed Bahlman, who sold independent singles at a store run by his girlfriend, and asked Bahlman if he would be interested in starting a label and releasing a record by Branca. Bahlman knew little about recording, pressing, and distributing records, but Branca had some experience with Theoretical Records. Having seen some of Branca's shows, Bahlman agreed and decided to make Lesson No. 1 the first release by 99 Records.

Branca needed guitar players to form a large guitar orchestra, and he posted fliers at record stores in downtown New York City. He held auditions at his apartment where he conducted guitar players. Thurston Moore, who performs on "Bad Smells", auditioned at the recommendation of his girlfriend Kim Gordon but was rejected. Rhys Chatham of the Gynecologists was initially upset after hearing the new band, feeling that it was reusing his ideas.

Branca's group performed around New York and was invited to perform at the Walker Art Center in Minneapolis. When three musicians pulled out, he recruited guitarist Lee Ranaldo. Ranaldo had seen Branca's ensemble perform at The Kitchen and lived in the same building as Branca's friend, pianist Anthony Coleman. Branca bought tickets providing unlimited flights for three weeks for what became his first tour. The tour began in December 1980 and included Ranaldo, Ned Sublette, David Rosenbloom, Jeffrey Glenn, and Stephan Wischerth. They traveled the country performing "Lesson No. 1 for Electric Guitar", "Dissonance", and "Compositions". Ranaldo, who performed with a six-string guitar strung with E_{6} strings, emerged as a foil to Branca. The two would playfully butt heads or guitars onstage. Some of the tour's audiences were unfamiliar with art music and heckled the band by calling the work "devil's music".

== Composition ==
"Lesson No. 1 for Electric Guitar"
Lesson No. 1 often uses repetitive sounds that build gradually.

Lesson No. 1 applies repetitive techniques that Branca learned from Chatham and Jeff Lohn. It combines these minimal music compositions with the aesthetics of punk rock. Branca uses dense overtones and shifting melodies created from repeated electric guitar parts. The guitars build during extended crescendoes.

"Lesson No. 1 for Electric Guitar" was inspired by the work of composer Steve Reich. It opens with two-note guitar figures similar to Reich's experiments with phasing. It introduces one-note parts on the organ and bass that gives the sense of harmonic progression, and drums enter the arrangement three minutes into the track. The piece is a structured improvisation where Branca specified the musical and tonal structures, but the strumming technique was improvised.

"Dissonance" is performed by Branca and Michael Gross on guitar, F.L. Schröder on bass, Coleman on organ, Wischerth on drums, and Harry Spitz on sledgehammer. Its polyrhythms imitate the constant motion of urban life. "Bad Smells" was originally commissioned by Twyla Tharp for a dance piece but was instead included on a 1982 spoken word record by John Giorno. The song features five guitarists: Branca, Sublette, Rosenbloom, Moore, and Ranaldo.

== Reception and impact ==
Professional ratings
Review scores
Source	Rating
AllMusic	4/5 stars
Pitchfork Media	(8.7/10)
Stylus Magazine	C

Upon Lesson No. 1's original release, John Rockwell wrote for The New York Times that "the effects and textures Mr. Branca achieves are really remarkable, and the sound…is unlike anything in music." AllMusic called the EP "a powerful, wrenching, transcendent piece of rock guitar classicism". Slant Magazine said that the EP is "primarily interesting as a historical curiosity that provides deeper insight into the genesis of Branca's music". Pitchfork Media commented that "the sound remains close enough to grab hold of you and lift you into Branca's intense world." The publication included "Lesson No. 1 for Electric Guitar" in its collection of The Pitchfork 500.

Despite only selling a few thousand copies, Lesson No. 1 became a seminal work in New York City's no wave movement. It became an influence on Moore and Ranaldo's work as members of alternative rock band Sonic Youth, and it paved the way for other experimental rock bands such as Swans. "Lesson No. 1 for Electric Guitar" is included in Soul Jazz Records' 2003 compilation New York Noise.

== Track listing ==
1. "Lesson No. 1 for Electric Guitar" – 8:17
2. "Dissonance" – 11:37
3. "Bad Smells" – 16:30
  - 2004 bonus track, recorded in 1982

== Personnel ==
- Glenn Branca – guitar, assistant producer (1,2)
- Anthony Coleman – organ, keyboards
- Michael Gross – guitar
- F.L. Schröder (aka Frank Schroder) – bass
- Stephan Wischerth – drums
- Harry Spitz – sledgehammer
- Thurston Moore – guitar (3)
- Lee Ranaldo – guitar (3)
- David Rosenbloom – guitar
- Ned Sublette – guitar
- Jeffrey Glenn – bass
- Mark Bingham – producer (1,2)
- Ed Bahlman – assistant producer (1,2)
- Craig Bishop – engineer (1,2)
- Jim Bonnefond – mixing engineer (1,2)
- Howie Weinberg – master engineer (1,2)
- James Farber – producer (3)
- Don Hünerberg – recording & mixing engineer (3)
