= Sonic Youth (EP) =

EP by Sonic Youth
- Released: March 1982
- Recorded: December 1981 – January 1982
- Studio: Plaza Sound, Radio City Music Hall, New York City, US
- Genre: Post-punk; no wave; art rock; experimental rock
- Length: 24:16
- Label: Neutral
- Producer: Sonic Youth

Sonic Youth chronology
Sonic Youth (1982)	Confusion Is Sex (1983)

Sonic Youth is the debut EP and first major release by American rock band Sonic Youth. It was recorded between December 1981 and January 1982 and released in March 1982 by Glenn Branca's Neutral label. It is the only recording featuring the early Sonic Youth lineup with Richard Edson on drums. Sonic Youth differs stylistically from the band's later work in its greater incorporation of clean guitars, standard tuning, crisp production and a post-punk style.

== Background ==
Unlike Sonic Youth's following releases, Sonic Youth predominantly uses E standard tuning for their guitars. James Jackson Toth of Stereogum stated that the album "sounds like the dark, post-punk cousin of Thurston's spunky new wave band the Coachmen." Drum-wise, the songs feature the more "downtown" roto-tom-addled stylings of Richard Edson, approaching the quasi-funk/hip-hop rhythms of 99 Records bands like ESG and Liquid Liquid. The bass guitar, though often playing minor key riffs, is almost funk-based, which was a common feature of post-punk and no wave music. The clean guitar tones contain little of the trademark noise that Sonic Youth would eventually become known for. One of the few parts of Sonic Youth that did carry over into their future releases was the use of prepared guitar, such as on "The Burning Spear", where Thurston Moore placed a drum stick under the strings of his guitar at the 12th fret.

Although the original record clocks in at about 25 minutes in length, Sonic Youth is considered by the band to be their first studio album. Kim Gordon has referred to it in her autobiography as an EP.

== Critical reception ==
Professional ratings
Review scores
Source	Rating
AllMusic	2.5/5 stars
Robert Christgau	C
Head Heritage	mildly favorable
Pitchfork	8.2/10
The Rolling Stone Album Guide	2/5 stars
Trouser Press	unfavorable

Sonic Youth has received a mixed reception from critics.

In retrospective reviews, Brandon Stosuy of Pitchfork gave the EP a grade of 8.2 out of 10, calling it "obviously more primitive than the quartet's later work [...] the recordings offer a ghostly, mesmerizing locked groove" and that "this is SY at their most icy; it's an erudite, windswept set, wrapping distortion inside danceable half-frozen Liquid Liquid beats." Andy Kellman of AllMusic wrote, "Awkward and rather formative, the record sounds like a fusion of no wave and an early Factory band." Trouser Press wrote of the album: "This disc is no fun."

== Releases ==
Sonic Youth was initially released on 12-inch vinyl in March 1982 on then-mentor Branca's record label Neutral. It was released in Europe on the German Zensor label in 1984.

In 1987, SST reissued the album in its original vinyl format, as well as on cassette with all five tracks running on its first side. The flip side of the cassette featured the same five tracks on the other side, but played backwards from last to first, and the printing on both the J-card and cassette matched this: side 1 had the band name and song titles printed forwards, side 2 had them printed as a mirror image. That same year, the EP saw its first CD release by SST in the U.S. and by Blast First in the UK.

Sonic Youth was reissued by Geffen Records in 2006 on CD and as a double LP, with a number of bonus tracks that brought the running time to 63:04. Added were seven songs from a live performance recorded on 18 September 1981. Most of the tracks played were based on pieces composed by the band for the Noisefest festival held earlier in 1981, while others predate the band itself, such as Gordon's song "Cosmopolitan Girl". Several of these pieces are quite different from their studio counterparts, in particular the noisy early version of "She Is Not Alone". Among the tracks is the instrumental "Destroyer", previously coveted by bootleg collectors. Also added was a studio recording of a song that also appeared in a live version, "Where the Red Fern Grows". The song, an early version of "I Dreamed I Dream", was recorded in October 1981 at a studio in Chelsea during the band's first recording session. The session did not go well due at least partially to an engineer who did not understand the band's music. The studio version was an instrumental, while on the live take, Lee sang two lines towards the end. The 2006 booklet contains new photos and extensive liner notes from Branca, Edson and Byron Coley, as well as a "few notes" concerning the album from Thurston Moore. On the CD reissue, the tray card is double-sided – the side that faces out contains the track listing with a bar code and an RIAA anti-piracy notice, and the opposite side has the same track listing without a bar code or an RIAA warning. Despite the CD reissue on Geffen, logos for Neutral Records can still be found in numerous places in the package.

== Track listing ==
All tracks are written by Sonic Youth (Thurston Moore, Kim Gordon, Lee Ranaldo, Richard Edson).

Side A
No.	Title	Vocals	Length
1.	"The Burning Spear"	Moore	3:28
2.	"I Dreamed I Dream"	Gordon, Ranaldo	5:12
3.	"She Is Not Alone"	Moore	4:06

Side B
No.	Title		Length
4.	"I Don't Want to Push It"	Moore	3:35
5.	"The Good and the Bad"	Instrumental	7:55

2006 CD reissue bonus tracks
No.	Title	Vocals	Length
6.	"Hard Work (Live)"	Moore	3:19
7.	"Where the Red Fern Grows (Live)"	Instrumental	5:47
8.	"The Burning Spear (Live)"	Moore	3:23
9.	"Cosmopolitan Girl (Live)"	Gordon	3:35
10.	"Loud and Soft (Live)"	Ranaldo	6:48
11.	"Destroyer (Live)"	Instrumental	5:32
12.	"She Is Not Alone (Live)"	Moore	3:29
13.	"Where the Red Fern Grows (Studio)"	Instrumental	6:45

- The bonus tracks were recorded live at the Music for Millions Festival at the New Pilgrim Theatre in New York on September 18, 1981, except for the studio version of "Where the Red Fern Grows" which was "recorded Noise NY sessions, engineer unknown, October 1981" according to the liner notes.

== Personnel ==
Sonic Youth

- Kim Gordon – bass guitar, vocals, guitar ("The Good and the Bad"), production
- Thurston Moore – guitar, vocals, bass guitar ("The Good and the Bad"), production
- Lee Ranaldo – guitar, vocals, power drill ("The Burning Spear"), production
- Richard Edson – drums, production

Technical

- Don Hünerberg – engineering
