= Johnny Boy (disambiguation) =

Johnny Boy was a Liverpool pop duo.

== Music ==
- Johnny Boy (album), by the Liverpool duo
- Johnny Boy Would Love This...A Tribute to John Martyn, tribute album to John Martyn 2011
- "Johnny Boy", song by Melanie Safka from Affectionately Melanie 1969
- "Johnny Boy", song by Gary Moore from Ballads & Blues 1982–1994 and The Platinum Collection (Gary Moore album)
- "Johnny Boy", song from Twenty One Pilots (album)

== People ==
- John "Johnny Boy" D'Amato New Jersey mobster
- John "Johnny Boy" Gotti mobster
- "Johnny Boy" Civello, in the film Mean Streets played by Robert De Niro
- Johnny Boy Soprano from List of The Sopranos characters

== Other uses ==
- "Johnnie Boy" or "Johnny Boy", a nuclear test conducted as part of Operation Sunbeam
