= Come Away with ESG =

Studio album by ESG
- Released: 1983
- Recorded: 1981–1983
- Genres: Avant-funk, post-punk, no wave, dub disco
- Length: 32:08
- Label: 99
- Producer: Ed Bahlman

ESG chronology
Come Away with ESG (1983)	ESG (1991)

Come Away with ESG is the 1983 debut album by American rock band ESG. Released by 99 Records, the album incorporates songs from ESG's first EPs, ESG and ESG Says Dance to the Beat of Moody.

In conjunction with its 35th anniversary, Fire Records reissued the album to glowing reception in 2018.

Come Away's critical resurgence has led it to be held in high esteem. It is regarded as a seminal work in no wave and post-punk music, as well as a key influence for the development of dance-punk and hip-hop music.

== Background ==
Ed Bahlman discovered ESG while serving as the judge for a talent show and became the band's unofficial manager. Tony Wilson from Factory Records approached the band after a performance at Hurrah on the Upper West Side of Manhattan, and three days later they began recording with Martin Hannett. The recordings helped bring Bahlman's focus to the band. He formed a partnership with Factory so that his 99 Records label could release ESG's eponymous debut EP in 1981.

ESG was a minimalist take on funk music, removing brass, saxophone, and synthesizers to leave vocals, bass, and percussion. The New York Times placed ESG second on its list of the best EPs and cassettes of 1981, and The Village Voice placed the EP third on its Pazz & Jop critics' poll.

"Moody" was released off of ESG as the band's debut single. A 12-inch remix single followed, and both versions found popularity at clubs in New York and London. Because of the single's release through Factory, many New York DJs assumed ESG was a London-based act. Paradise Garage listed the song in its top 50 all-time tracks. It became a foundational track for the emerging house music scene.

"Dance"
Reused off of the ESG Says Dance to the Beat of Moody EP, "Dance" uses a beat similar to the Motown Sound.

ESG released a second EP titled ESG Says Dance to the Beat of Moody in 1982. It includes "Dance" and "The Beat", which reappear on Come Away with ESG. The EP placed ninth on that year's Pazz & Jop list. As several of its post-punk contemporaries were breaking up, the band continued to keep some amount of distance from the music business.

== Composition ==
Come Away has been stylistically aligned with the avant-funk, no wave, and post-punk movements. Paste called its sound dub disco with punk's edge. Resident Advisor said it fused disco, funk, and punk with avant-garde's flair.

== Release and legacy ==
Professional ratings
Review scores
Source	Rating
AllMusic	4.5/5 stars
Mojo	4/5 stars
Paste	8.4/10
Record Collector	4/5 stars
Uncut	4/5 stars

ESG recorded the rest of Come Away with ESG at Radio City Music Hall in 1983 and released the album through 99 Records later that year. The band's first performance after the release was at Danceteria. Around half of the tracks on the album are instrumentals. The songs that do include vocals focus on danceable chants. Shortly after the release of Come Away with ESG, the band became inactive for several years, in part because of the closure of 99 Records.

Decades after its release, Come Away with ESG saw a critical resurgence. It was named the 84th greatest album of the 1980s by Pitchfork. The album became influential for post-punk, dance, and hip-hop acts. Kathleen Hanna stated that it influenced her work with Le Tigre. Royal Trux member Jennifer Herrema has also cited Come Away with ESG as an influence.

NPR Music dubbed the songs "prescient" for their time. They also felt Come Away proved disparate sounds like Latin funk and post-punk could be fused successfully. PopMatters argued that "all funky rock music was chasing after [Come Away]" after 1983, the year of its release. Treble ranked the album #23 on their list of post-punk's best albums. They claimed the album cemented ESG's legacy in the early '80s no wave scene. The band's "buzzy [and] rug-cutting" rhythms were seen for being essential to NYC dance-punk's future generation. Chicago Reader echoed this, seeing their "stark" genre fusion trickle into the scene's 2000s bands like Liars and the Rapture. Resident Advisor called it "an essential dance music blueprint", noting that its "party chants" prefigured aspects of house music. Paste wrote that G-funk, a form of gangsta rap started in the late '80s, was anticipated through "About You"'s "eerily twisting" synth.

=== Accolades ===
Publication	Year	List	Rank	Ref.
NPR Music	2017	The 150 Greatest Albums Made By Women	104	
Pitchfork	2002	The Top 100 Albums of the 1980s	84	
Pitchfork	2018	The 200 Best Albums of the 1980s	50	
PopMatters	2020	The 50 Best Post-Punk Albums Ever	32	
Treble	2018	The 100 Best Post-Punk Albums	23	
Vinyl Me, Please	2017	The 10 Best No Wave Albums To Own On Vinyl	—	

== Track listing ==
All songs written by ESG.

1. "Come Away" – 3:15
2. "Dance" – 4:32
3. "You Make No Sense" – 2:20
4. "Parking Lot Blues" – 2:53
5. "Chistelle" – 1:54
6. "About You" – 2:05
7. "It's Alright" – 2:38
8. "Moody (Spaced Out)" – 4:18
9. "Tiny Sticks" – 3:02
10. "The Beat" – 2:17
11. "My Love for You" – 2:54

== Personnel ==
Credits adapted from Come Away with ESG liner notes.

ESG

- Renee Scroggins – lead vocals, guitar
- Deborah Scroggins – bass, backing vocals
- Marie Scroggins – congas, backing vocals
- Valerie Scroggins – drums, backing vocals

Additional musicians

- Tito Libran – congas

Production

- Ed Bahlman – production
- Howie Weinberg – mastering
- Don Hünerberg – engineering
