= Disband (band) =

Disband was an all-female No Wave performance group in New York City from 1978–1982. Modeled after a rock band, the members were artists rather than musicians. The band's sound was a type of a cappella No Wave. Disband performed mostly at art venues like Public Arts International/Free Speech, Franklin Furnace, P.S.1 Contemporary Art Center and Hallwalls. Disband was popular with the Feminist art audience due to songs like "Every Girl", "Hey Baby", and "Fashions".

In 2008, Disband reunited to perform at P.S.1 Contemporary Art Center as part of the exhibition "Wack! Art and the Feminist Revolution.". This show originated at Museum of Contemporary Art, Los Angeles.

The core members of Disband were Ilona Granet, Donna Henes, Ingrid Sischy, Diane Torr, and Martha Wilson. Early band members included Barbara Ess, Daile Kaplan, April Gornick, and Barbara Kruger who wrote a couple of their songs.

Besides their roles as artists, the members were active in the downtown scene. Ilona Granet, Barbara Ess and Daile Kaplan played in other bands like Static, the Y Pants, and The Gynecologists. Martha Wilson was the founder of Franklin Furnace, an exhibition space. Ingrid Sischy was editor of Artforum and Interview.

== Discography ==
Disband never put out any records, but in 2008 a DVD of their performances, Best of Disband, was released. In 2009, Primary Information put out Disband's first CD.

== See also ==
- Noise music
- ABC No Rio
- No wave
- Colab
- Tellus Audio Cassette Magazine
