= Don Hünerberg =

Don Hunerberg
- Born: New York City, New York, US
- Occupations: Audio engineer, music producer
- Years active: 1976–present
- Notable work: Blondie, Ramones, ESG, Richard Hell, Glenn Branca, John Zorn, Sonic Youth

Don Hunerberg (or Don Hünerberg) is an American audio engineer and music producer from New York City, New York. He is known for his influential work in the punk rock and avant-garde music scenes, contributing to the early sound of seminal punk bands such as Blondie, Ramones, ESG, Richard Hell, Sonic Youth as well as collaborating with avant-garde artists like Glenn Branca and John Zorn.

== Career ==
Hunerberg began his career as a recording engineer at Plaza Sound Studios from September 1976 to June 1980, where he worked on early punk recordings. He later became the chief engineer at Radio City Music Hall Studio from 1980 to 1989, during which he worked on audio for Macy's Thanksgiving Day Parade broadcasts alongside Milton Delugg. Since 1989, Hunerberg has worked as a freelance music recording producer.

Hunerberg's engineering work includes collaborations with some of the most iconic punk bands, such as Blondie and the Ramones, helping to shape the fast-paced, gritty sound that defined the genre. He has also worked at notable studios like Electric Lady Studios and Platinum Island.

In addition to his contributions to punk rock, Hunerberg has worked on numerous remix projects and expanded his career into avant-garde and experimental music, collaborating with artists like Glenn Branca and John Zorn. His own band is IMA (Intense Molecular Activity)

== Collaborations ==
- Blondie—engineering on Blondie
- Ramones—engineering on Ramones
- Richard Hell—engineering on Blank Generation
- Sonic Youth—engineering on Sonic Youth
- ESG—engineering on Come Away with ESG
- Glenn Branca—engineering on Lesson No. 1
- John Zorn—recording/mixing on Spillane

== Legacy ==
Don Hunerberg’s work continues to be recognized for its impact on both mainstream and underground music. He was the recording engineer for Liquid Liquid's song "Cavern" on the Optimo (EP) which was later sampled on White Lines (Don't Do It) and later embroiled in legal controversy. His ability to capture the intensity of punk rock while also working with avant-garde compositions has earned him a reputation as a versatile and innovative engineer.
