= Anne DeMarinis =

- Genres: Alternative rock, indie, classical No Wave
- Occupations: Musician, Art designer
- Instruments: Accordion, keyboards, vocals, guitar, percussion, oberheim, synclavier, synthesizer

Anne DeMarinis is an American musician and visual artist known for designing album covers. She is a former member of Sonic Youth.

In 1981 she founded the No Wave band Interference with David Linton and Michael Brown.

== Musical Career ==
Anne DeMarinis was in the No Wave band Sonic Youth for a brief period in 1981 as a keyboardist when they performed for the first time at the Noise Fest at the White Columns art space. She contributed vocals, along with Kim Gordon, and Thurston Moore, on three (known) Sonic Youth songs performed once, and only live on June 18, 1981. The songs are entitled "Noisefest #1", "Noisefest #2", and "Noisefest #3". She also played guitar at that same show on the song entitled "Noisefest #4".

DeMarinis left the band before their self-titled debut EP was recorded in December 1981.

In 1981, she also appeared on the Just Another Asshole compilation.

DeMarinis also appears on Glenn Branca's instrumental album Symphony No. 1 where she is credited for keyboards and percussion and as a co-producer. Thurston Moore, and Lee Ranaldo also appear on this album.

She also appears on Ten Roir Years, along with Thurston Moore and Lee Ranaldo.

DeMarinis also worked with Laurie Anderson on her album's United States Live, and Talk Normal: The Laurie Anderson Anthology.

She appears on the cover compilation album Live at the Knitting Factory: Downtown Does the Beatles, where she plays the accordion.

In 1993, she played accordion on Kurt Hoffman's Band of Weeds.

She played accordion on the album Dot by George Cartwright.

In 1994, she was credited for playing accordion on the album To All My Friends in Far-Flung Places by Dave Van Ronk.

She is credited on two of Robert Een's albums Big Joe (1995), and Mr.Jealousy (1998).

DeMarinis is credited as the "Art Director" on Michael Davis' album Trumpets Eleven, and on his album Brass Nation.

She played the accordion, and is also the art director on the album Smoke and Mirrors by Steven Elson.

In 2006, she appeared on Dave Soldier's Chamber Music CD.
