= Youth in Asia (No Wave band) =

1970s avant-garde art Noise band from New York City

- Origin: New York City, New York, U.S.
- Genres: No wave; noise music
- Years active: 1978–1979
- Past members: Frank Schroder; Taro Suzuki; Steven Harvey; Stephan Wischerth

Youth in Asia (also known as Youthinasia and YIA) was an American no wave conceptual art noise music band from New York City that was formed in 1978 by Frank Schroder (bass), Taro Suzuki (keyboards and vocals), Steven Harvey (guitar and vocals) and Stephan Wischerth (drums).

== History ==
Founders, Taro Suzuki and Frank Schroder were (and are) practicing visual artists. Steven Harvey was an artist and now runs an art gallery called steven harvey fine art projects. Both Stephan Wischerth and Steven Harvey have tracks on the Just Another Asshole compilation anthology. Thus the post-punk band members were very much interested in visual and conceptual art and thus they didn’t have much musical training. Something typical of no wave music bands, in general. They were more interested in making conceptual noise music with a beat, than traditional new wave music. For example, Taro Suzuki played the piano with his forehead in the band.

== Performance history ==
The group’s first appearance was at 66 East 4th Street in the summer of 1978. They played there along with The Contortions, Theoretical Girls, DNA and other post-punk noise bands. In 1979, they were the sole noise band who performed in the Public Arts International/Free Speech performance festival on the invitation of Joseph Nechvatal. Harvey, Suzuki and Schroder also played in Glenn Branca’s first instrumental group for six guitars and Schroder and Wischerth continued to play with Branca, Wischerth being his regular drummer for several years.

The last performance of YIA was Taro Suzuki’s Shock Opera performed with a video installation at Danceteria.

Youth in Asia was booked once at Tier 3 after breaking up, with two original band members Taro Suzuki and Frank Schroder performing with visual artists Richard Prince (on guitar), Dike Blair (on radio guitar) and Nancy Arlen, the sculptor and drummer (from Mars)

== Recording history ==
Youth in Asia's song Amnesia was released on the 135 Grand Street: New York 1979 CD published in 2010 by Soul Jazz Records. Youth in Asia appear on the 135 Grand Street New York 1979 video by Ericka Beckman and a photo of two members of the group appear on the back cover of the 55 minutes Super-8/HD box that was released by Beckman in 2009.

== Members ==
- Frank Schroder (bass)
- Taro Suzuki (keyboards and vocals)
- Steven Harvey (guitar and vocals)
- Stephan Wischerth (drums)

=== Augmenting YIA ===
- Evan Lurie from the Lounge Lizards
- Fritz Van Orden from The Ordinaires
- Richard Prince
- Dike Blair
- Nancy Arlen from Mars

== See also ==
- Mudd Club
- Just Another Asshole
