= Confusion Is Sex =

Album by Sonic Youth

Studio album by Sonic Youth
- Released: 1983
- Recorded: 1982–1983
- Genre: Noise rock; no wave
- Length: 35:40
- Label: Neutral
- Producer: Sonic Youth; Wharton Tiers; John Erskine

Sonic Youth chronology
Sonic Youth (1982)	Confusion Is Sex (1983)	Kill Yr Idols (1983)

Sonic Youth studio album chronology
Confusion Is Sex (1983)	Bad Moon Rising (1985)

Confusion Is Sex is the debut studio album by American noise rock band Sonic Youth. It was released in 1983 by Neutral Records. In contrast with the band's later excursions into more melodic noise rock, this album features a more lo-fi, avant-garde sound emblematic of the no wave genre that the band originally emerged from.

Sonic Youth formed after the meeting of guitarist Thurston Moore and bassist Kim Gordon, who would eventually recruit guitarist Lee Ranaldo, who additionally plays bass on the album, which would be the only time this happened during the band's career. This album would be recorded after the release of their Eponymous debut EP the previous year.

The album has been referred to as an important example of the no wave genre, but has been met with a polarized critical reception in the decades since it was first released.

== Background ==
Upon arriving in New York City in 1977, guitarist Thurston Moore quickly became involved in the local music scene, forming The Coachmen, which broke up shortly after forming. After the breakup of The Coachmen, Moore would meet bassist Kim Gordon, and form the band that would become Sonic Youth. They would later recruit Lee Ranaldo, who they discovered after watching him perform with Glenn Branca.

Branca would prove to be critical to the band in their early history, who signed the band to his Neutral Records. While with Neutral, they would record their Eponymous debut EP and their debut album, Confusion is Sex.

== Recording ==
Confusion Is Sex was recorded by Wharton Tiers in his Chelsea studio (which he had set up in the basement of a building where he worked as a superintendent). It was mostly recorded during Jim Sclavunos' brief tenure as drummer for the band, and he appears on drums for most of the album. As the sessions drew to a close, Sclavunos chose to quit and Bob Bert was invited back. Bert appeared on "Making the Nature Scene" and the live Stooges cover version of "I Wanna Be Your Dog". Confusion Is Sex is the only Sonic Youth album on which guitarist Lee Ranaldo plays bass, specifically on the song "Protect Me You".

The lyrics to "The World Looks Red" were written by Michael Gira of the band Swans, who would later reuse the same lyrics on the song "The World Looks Red/The World Looks Black" on that band's 2016 album The Glowing Man.

Ranaldo recorded the track "Lee Is Free" solo at home on two tape recorders.

== Content ==
In a 1984 Trouser Press review, John Leland stated that, on this album, "confusion reigns and happily so. This album sprays out slivers of ringing, reeling, screaming six-string debris, much of it produced with drumsticks and weird tunings. Partaking of Branca's dissonance, Flipper's anarchy and PIL's desperation, these Lower East Side arties capture the violence and hope of their neighborhood. If these sounds hit like an aural root canal, that's just what the doctor ordered."

The cover image is a sketch by bassist Kim Gordon of guitarist Thurston Moore. This image was used on gig posters early in the band's career.

== Reception ==
Professional ratings
Review scores
Source	Rating
AllMusic	2/5 stars
Blender	1/5 stars
Chicago Tribune	2/4 stars
Christgau's Record Guide	C+
Entertainment Weekly	A−
Q	3/5 stars
The Rolling Stone Album Guide	3/5 stars
Select	3/5
Spin	8/10
Spin Alternative Record Guide	8/10

Though considered an important example of no wave, the album has received polarized reception in the decades since its release. Blender described the album as, "a strike against pop goop, and practically a manifesto against pleasure." Writing for the Chicago Tribune, Greg Kot claimed that, "Sonic Youth's initial attempts at capturing its noise-guitar revolution fell flat on the 'Confusion is Sex' album."

On the contrary, Spin claimed that the album, "stands as the great document of early Sonic Youth," while Chuck Eddy of Entertainment Weekly referred to the album as "the band's funniest, hardest-rocking, and most underrated album ever."

== Track listing ==
All tracks are written by Sonic Youth, except where noted.

Side A
No.	Title	Writer(s)	Vocals	Length
1.	"(She's in A) Bad Mood"		Moore	5:36
2.	"Protect Me You"		Gordon	5:28
3.	"Freezer Burn/I Wanna Be Your Dog" (The Stooges cover)	Sonic Youth/The Stooges	Gordon	3:39
4.	"Shaking Hell"		Gordon	4:06

Side B
No.	Title	Lyrics	Music	Vocals	Length
5.	"Inhuman"			Moore	4:03
6.	"The World Looks Red"	Michael Gira	Sonic Youth	Moore	2:43
7.	"Confusion Is Next"			Moore	3:28
8.	"Making the Nature Scene"			Gordon	3:01
9.	"Lee Is Free"				3:37

1995 CD reissue bonus tracks (Kill Yr Idols EP)
No.	Title	Vocals	Length
10.	"Kill Yr Idols"	Moore	2:51
11.	"Brother James"	Gordon	3:17
12.	"Early American"	Gordon	6:07
13.	"Shaking Hell (Live)"	Gordon	3:15

== Personnel ==
Sonic Youth

- Kim Gordon – vocals, bass guitar, guitar, production
- Thurston Moore – vocals, guitar, prepared guitar, bass guitar, production
- Lee Ranaldo – guitar, bass guitar ("Protect Me You"), zither ("Inhuman"), production
- Jim Sclavunos – drums, production (all tracks except 3, 8, and 10–13)
- Bob Bert – drums, production (tracks 3, 8, and 10–13)

Production

- Wharton Tiers – production, engineering
- John Erskine – engineering assistance

== Sources ==
- Azerrad, Michael (2001). Our Band Could Be Your Life. New York: Little, Brown.
