= Optimo (EP) =

EP by Liquid Liquid
- Released: 1983
- Recorded: Radio City Studio, New York, United States
- Genre: Dance-punk
- Length: 13:52
- Label: 99
- Producer: Ed Bahlman

Liquid Liquid chronology
Successive Reflexes (1981)	Optimo (1983)	Liquid Liquid (1997)

Optimo is the third EP by American dance-punk band Liquid Liquid. It was released through 99 Records in 1983, becoming the band's final release until the 1997 compilation album Liquid Liquid. The EP includes Liquid Liquid's best-known song "Cavern", which was the subject of a dispute after being used for Grandmaster Melle Mel's "White Lines (Don't Don't Do It)".

== Background ==
The band began work on Optimo in late 1982, recording it in a studio on the top floor of Radio City Music Hall. The songs emerged from group jam sessions. Liquid Liquid was recorded live, using portable sound barriers so the songs could be mixed. Because the studio had previously been used by NBC Radio, the band was able to use some sound effects. Ed Bahlman, who ran 99 Records, produced the EP and had the band record extended versions of songs.

Bassist Richard McGuire did the cover artwork, which consists of red, yellow, and black whorls. He wanted to capture the songs' rhythms, which he described as "like standing in the middle of four tornados all swirling around". The band's name is formed by placing liquid in stacked letters next to liquid written with a vertical baseline. McGuire wanted it to be readable in two directions so "that you had to move it to read it." The band considered "Optimo" to be "the main track" and named the EP after it.

== Composition ==
"Optimo"
The songs combine chants with energetic basslines.

The title track "Optimo" gets its name from a brand of cigars. It includes a percussion section that uses the snare drum, bass kick drum, rototom, cowbell, and claves. The beat uses repeated drum rolls. "Optimo" also features a strummed two-note bassline and nonsensical lyrics. Its rhythm is similar to Brazilian batucada music. The EP also contains "Cavern", for which the band is most widely remembered. The song uses a "tightly coiled" bassline and displays "quintessential Lower East Side tension and paranoia".

== Release and history ==
Bahlman considered "Cavern" the record's most important track and pressed an acetate disc of it. Thinking of it as a dance song, he gauged people's reaction after giving it to his brother Bill to play at the Anvil. "Cavern" soon became popular on black radio stations in New York. Upon release, Optimo sold 30,000 copies. "Cavern" found popularity among nightclubs and hip hop musicians after DJ John Benitez used the song to close his sets at The Funhouse. McGuire gave a copy of the EP to Larry Levan at the Paradise Garage, where the band performed several times. "Optimo" and "Cavern" were used by house DJs Frankie Knuckles and Ron Hardy.

Elements of "Cavern" were used for the Grandmaster Melle Mel song "White Lines (Don't Don't Do It)". Grandmaster Flash first encountered the song through WHBI's Zulu Beats program. Sugarhill Records' house band replayed the music with traditional instruments, using the bassline and bridge from "Cavern". Liquid Liquid was initially pleased, and vocalist Salvatore Principato commented that "we felt a combination of flattery, excitement and bewilderment". "Cavern" subsequently fell out of rotation and was replaced by "White Lines". 99 Records sued Sugar Hill for the similarities between the two tracks. McGuire accused Sugar Hill of retaliating through scare tactics, including hiring someone to scare 99's customers with a machete. Sugar Hill was ordered to pay $660,000 but instead declared bankruptcy shortly after. Bahlman shut down 99, in part because of the case's legal costs.

== Legacy ==
Professional ratings
Review scores
Source	Rating
Pitchfork Media	10/10

"Optimo" is included in Pitchfork Media's collection of The Pitchfork 500. Stylus Magazine ranked "Cavern" 49 on its list of the "Top Basslines of All Time". Optimo, a weekly club night in Glasgow, Scotland, takes its name from the eponymous song.

Joey Negro included "Cavern" in his 2000 Disco Not Disco compilation. "Optimo" appears on Soul Jazz Records's 2003 compilation New York Noise. "Cavern" was included in the soundtrack for Edo Bertoglio's Downtown 81, which depicted Manhattan bands in the early 1980s, and Spike Lee used it as the theme song for his 2002 drama 25th Hour.

"Optimo" was played live during the samba performance in 2021 Italian Dancing with the Stars TV show, where Morgan and Alessandra Tripoli played cowbells and timbales.

== Track listing ==
All tracks are written by Liquid Liquid.

Side A
No.	Title	Length
1.	"Optimo"	2:43
2.	"Cavern"	5:21

Side B
No.	Title	Length
1.	"Scraper"	3:41
2.	"Out"	2:07

== Personnel ==
Liquid Liquid

- Salvatore Principato – vocals, percussion
- Scott Hartley – drums, percussion
- Richard McGuire – bass guitar, percussion, sleeve artwork
- Dennis Young – marimba, percussion

Technical

- Ed Bahlman – production
- Don Hünerberg – engineering
- Howie Weinberg – mastering
