= Keep On Movin' =

Keep On Movin' or Keep On Moving may refer to:

== Albums ==
- Club Classics Vol. One, a 1989 Soul II Soul album released in the U.S. as Keep On Movin'
- Keep On Moving (The Butterfield Blues Band album), 1969
- Keep On Moving (Shaan album), 1993
- Keep on Moving (ESG album), 2006
- Keep On Moving, a 1999 album by Funkstar De Luxe
- Keep On Moving, a 2001 album by SHINEmk

== Songs ==
- "Keep On Movin'" (Alexia song), 1998
- "Keep On Movin'" (Five song), 1999
- "Keep On Movin'" (Soul II Soul song), 1989
- "Keep On Moving", a 1971 song by Bob Marley and the Wailers from Soul Revolution Part II
- "Keep On Moving", a 2006 song by Dover from Follow the City Lights
- "Keep On Moving", a 2017 song by Michelle Delamor featured in Just Dance 2018
- "Keep On Movin'", a 2015 song by Joe Satriani from Shockwave Supernova

== Television ==
- "Keep On Movin'" (Eureka Seven)
