= 99 Records =

American independent record label

- Founded: 1980
- Founder: Ed Bahlman
- Defunct: 1986
- Genre: Post-punk, no wave
- Country of origin: U.S.
- Location: Greenwich Village, New York

99 Records was an American independent record label, active from 1980 to 1984. The label was home to musicians in the no wave, post-punk, post-disco, and avant-garde scenes in New York City.

== History ==
British designer Gina Franklyn sold British fashions out of her shop 99, located at 99 MacDougal Street in New York's Greenwich Village. She began dating Ed Bahlman, who sold independent record singles out of the store. During trips to England, he and Franklyn brought back suitcases of music, particularly from Rough Trade. They focused on independent and punk music, becoming a successful rival to Bleecker Bob's in the West Village. They also had a selection of funk and reggae. The store's arty appeal stood in contrast to many of the local businesses, which Bush Tetras member Dee Pop called "real Bob Dylan territory". Vivien Goldman described the store as "a milieu...[with] a very creative atmosphere." Ed recruited his brother Bill Bahlman to work at 99. Bill was an in-house DJ in many NYC clubs, including Hurrah, Danceteria and The Anvil.

No Wave composer-guitarist Glenn Branca approached Bahlman to see if he would be interested in starting a label and releasing a record by Branca. Bahlman knew little about recording, pressing, and distributing records, but Branca had some experience with Theoretical Records. Bahlman agreed and made Lesson No. 1 the first release by 99 Records. The label distributed primarily through its own store but also through Jem, Important, and Sky Disk. In 1980 and 1981 the label released several records for local bands, some of which had crossover success in dance clubs. Bush Tetras and ESG appeared on the disco charts, and 99 had its most successful releases with ESG and Liquid Liquid.

In 1981 the relationship between Bahlman and Branca became strained, especially after Bahlman's refusal to sign a fledgling Sonic Youth. Branca went to start his own label Neutral Records, and 99's roster was reduced to ESG and Liquid Liquid. Bahlman stated that over a hundred acts had asked about releasing music through 99 but that growing too fast would damage the label's "sense of identity." 99 had only one release the following year.

In 1983 Grandmaster Melle Mel released "White Lines (Don't Don't Do It)", which used elements of "Cavern" from Liquid Liquid's Optimo EP. 99 sued Sugar Hill Records for the similarities between the two tracks. 99 employee Terry Tolkin and Liquid Liquid member Richard McGuire have both accused Sugar Hill of retaliating through scare tactics, including hiring someone to scare 99's customers with a machete. Tolkin stated that Bahlman refused to visit the store for a year and a half and alleged that Bahlman had received threats regularly. Franklyn has dismissed these accounts as "complete exaggeration". Sugar Hill was ordered to pay $660,000 but instead declared bankruptcy shortly after. Bahlman shut down 99, in part because of the case's legal costs. In early 1986, Bahlman sold off 99's inventory and went into seclusion.

== Aftermath and legacy ==
Since its demise, the reputation of the label and that of its groups has steadily grown. Branca rose to prominence as a composer during the 1980s, and with new popularity in post-punk and post-disco, labelmates ESG and Liquid Liquid re-formed and have been featured guests at international music festivals. Bahlman has declined to give master recordings to 99's artists. As a result, some bands have gone through British labels to reissue their work.

During the 2000s, 99's arrangements guided the dance music community in New York, particularly dance-punk label DFA Records. Musician James Murphy named 99 as one of his favorite labels, and it has been a major influence on his bass technique with LCD Soundsystem. The label has been cited as a major influence of Franz Ferdinand and Futureheads.

== Discography ==
- 99-01 12" (1980) Glenn Branca – Lesson No. 1
- 99-02 7" (1980) Bush Tetras – "Too Many Creeps"
- 99-03 7" (1980) Y Pants – Off the Hook
- 99-04 12" (1981) ESG – ESG
- 99-05 12" (1981) Vivien Goldman – Dirty Washing
- 99-06 12" (1981) The Congos ("Ashanti" Roy) – At the Feast
- 99-07 12" (1981) Liquid Liquid – Liquid Liquid
- 99-08 12" (1981) Maximum Joy – Stretch (licensed from UK label Y Records)
- 99-09 12" (1981) Liquid Liquid – Successive Reflexes
- 99-001LP LP (1981) Glenn Branca – The Ascension
- 99-002LP LP (1981) Singers & Players – War of Words
- 99-11EP7 7" (1981) Liquid Liquid – "Bellhead"/"Push"
- 99-10 12" (1982) ESG – ESG Says Dance to the Beat of Moody
- 99-11 12" (1983) Liquid Liquid – Optimo
- 99-003LP LP (1983) ESG – Come Away with ESG
- 99-13 12" (1985) Liquid Liquid – Dig We Must
