= Liquid Liquid (EP) =

EP by Liquid Liquid
- Released: 1981
- Recorded: February 13, 1981 at Hurrah, New York City; Man Made Studios
- Genre: Dance-punk
- Length: 13:07
- Label: 99
- Producer: Ed Bahlman, Liquid Liquid, Bruce Tovsky

Liquid Liquid chronology
Liquid Liquid (1981)	Successive Reflexes (1981)

Liquid Liquid is the debut EP by the American no wave and dance-punk group Liquid Liquid. It was released in 1981, through the record label 99.

== Background ==
"New Walk", "Lub Dupe" and "Bell Head" were recorded live at Hurrahs in New York City on February 13, 1981 and were produced by Ed Bahlman. The other two tracks were recorded at Man Made Studios, and were produced by Liquid Liquid themselves along with Bahlman and Bruce Tovsky on the final track, "Rubbermiro".

== Track listing ==
Side A
No.	Title	Length
1.	"Groupmegroup"	3:18
2.	"New Walk"	2:07
3.	"Lub Dupe"	1:49

Side B
No.	Title	Length
1.	"Bell Head"	2:19
2.	"Rubbermiro"	3:34

== Critical reception ==
Professional ratings
Review scores
Source	Rating
Pitchfork Media	(9.2/10)

Trouser Press classified the EP as "impressive".

== Personnel ==
Liquid Liquid

- Salvatore Principato – vocals, percussion
- Richard McGuire – bass guitar, percussion, guitar, melodica, cover design, production ("Groupmegroup", "Rubbermiro")
- Bill Kleinsmith – congas, production ("Groupmegroup", "Rubbermiro")
- Scott Hartley – drums, percussion, production ("Groupmegroup", "Rubbermiro")
- Dennis Young – marimba, percussion, production ("Groupmegroup", "Rubbermiro")
- Al Diaz – percussion
- R. Edson (Richard Edson) – trumpet

Technical

- Ed Bahlman – production ("New Walk", "Lub Dupe", "Bell Head")
- Bruce Tovsky – production ("Rubbermiro")
- HW (Howie Weinberg) – mastering
