= Step off =

Step off may refer to:

- Step-off, a parameter in estimating the severity of injury of the posterior cruciate ligament
- Step Off (album)
- Step Off, 1984 Melle Mel song
