= Indeterminate Activity of Resultant Masses =

Live album by Glenn Branca
- Released: 2007
- Recorded: 1982
- Genre: Avant-garde
- Length: 57:14
- Label: Atavistic

Glenn Branca chronology
The Ascension (1982)	Indeterminate Activity of Resultant Masses (2007)

Professional ratings
Review scores
Source	Rating
Allmusic	3/5 stars
Dusted Magazine	(favorable)

Indeterminate Activity of Resultant Masses is a CD release by Glenn Branca from 2007, recorded in 1982. The CD also features an interview by Wim Mertens with John Cage who gives a very negative opinion about the music of Glenn Branca. The CD was released by Atavistic Records.

== Track listing ==
1. Indeterminate Activity of Resultant Masses (1982) - 31:11
2. So That Each Person is in Charge of Himself (1982 interview with John Cage) - 18:47
3. Harmonic Series Chords (1989) - 7:16
