= ESG (EP) =

EP by ESG
- Released: 1981
- Recorded: 1980
- Genre: Funk
- Label: 99
- Producers: Martin Hannett, Ed Bahlman

ESG chronology
| ESG (1981) | ESG Says Dance to the Beat of Moody (1982) |

ESG is the debut EP by American rock band ESG. It was released by 99 Records in 1981. The EP received positive reviews from music critics. "Moody" became popular with house DJs, and "UFO" came to be one of the most sampled tracks in hip-hop music.

== History ==
Ed Bahlman discovered ESG while serving as the judge for a talent show and became the band's unofficial manager. Tony Wilson from Factory Records approached the band after a performance at Hurrah on the Upper West Side of Manhattan and three days later they began recording with Martin Hannett. They recorded "Moody" and "You're No Good" in the first take. Hannett had three minutes left on the master tape, so he had the band record "UFO". The recordings helped bring Bahlman's focus to the band. On December 3, 1980, he recorded ESG's performance at Hurrah, which became the B-side for ESG. Bahlman formed a partnership with Factory so that his 99 Records label could release the EP in 1981. By July, they made a second pressing of the record.

The band's name—and the EP's title—stands for emerald, sapphire, and gold. Emerald and sapphire are Valerie and Renee Scroggins' birthstones and gold refers to the record certification. The blue, green, and yellow cover artwork was adapted for ESG's 2000 compilation A South Bronx Story. The artwork for its 2015 Record Store Day release of The Moody EP is loosely based on the ESG cover. Lead vocalist Renee Scroggins criticized the adaptation, saying it looked like someone had "puked it on a canvas".

ESG is a minimalist take on funk music, removing brass, saxophone and synthesizers to leave vocals, bass, and percussion. It was received positively by music critics. Robert Palmer called it one of 1981's "freshest records". For Billboard magazine, Leo Sacks wrote that "the beauty of this album is that it is so natural, so kinetic, and so compelling." The New York Times placed ESG second on its list of the best EPs and cassettes of 1981 and The Village Voice placed the EP third on its Pazz & Jop critics' poll.

== Songs ==
"Moody"
"Moody" became an early influence on house music.

"Moody" was released off of ESG as the band's debut single. A 12-inch remix single followed, and both versions found popularity at clubs in New York and London. Because of the single's release through Factory, many New York DJs assumed ESG was a London-based act. Paradise Garage listed the song in its top 50 all-time tracks. It became a foundational track for the emerging house music scene. House producer Chip E. used the song's bassline for his 1985 single "Like This". Swedish producer Christian Falk covered "Moody" with Neneh Cherry on his 1999 album Quel Bordel and released a second version with singer Kenny Bobien.

"UFO" is inspired by the conclusion of Steven Spielberg's Close Encounters of the Third Kind, where government officials communicate with an extraterrestrial craft using music. Renee Scroggins wrote the song imagining what would happen if a UFO had instead landed in the housing projects. "UFO" has since been sampled in over 560 songs, becoming one of the most sampled tracks in hip-hop music. ESG did not receive royalties for the sampling for around 20 years. The band referenced this with the title of its 1992 EP Sample Credits Don’t Pay Our Bills.

== Track listing ==
All songs written by ESG.

1. "You're No Good"
2. "Moody"
3. "UFO"
4. "Earn It"
5. "ESG"
6. "Hey!"

== Personnel ==
Credits adapted from ESG liner notes.

ESG

- Renee Scroggins – lead vocals, guitar
- Deborah Scroggins – bass, backing vocals
- Marie Scroggins – congas, backing vocals
- Valerie Scroggins – drums, backing vocals

Additional musicians

- Tito Libran – congas

Production

- Martin Hannett – production (1–3)
- Ed Bahlman – production (4–6)
- Gina Franklyn – artwork, sleeve design
