= Step Off =

Studio album by ESG
- Released: October 8, 2002
- Recorded: 2002
- Genre: Post-punk; funk
- Length: 31:14
- Label: Soul Jazz
- Producer: Renee Scroggins, Pete Reilly

ESG chronology
A South Bronx Story (2000)	Step Off (2002)	Keep on Moving (2006)

Professional ratings
Aggregate scores
Source	Rating
Metacritic	71/100
Review scores
Source	Rating
AllMusic	4/5 stars
The Guardian	3/5 stars
Vibe	3.5/5 stars

Step Off is an album by rock band ESG, released in 2002.

== Legacy ==
Professional ratings
Review scores
Source	Rating
PopMatters	7/10
Record Collector	4/5 stars

Fifteen years since its release, critics returned to the album. PopMatters' John Paul applauded it for staying "as timeless as ever", writing that it "exist[s] in that rarified region of albums refusing to be date-stamped."

== Track listing ==
- all songs written by Renee Scroggins and Valerie Scroggins
1. "Be Good To Me" - 3:54
2. "Talk It" - 3:58
3. "It's Not Me" - 3:55
4. "Six Pack" - 4:16
5. "Step Off" - 5:14
6. "Sensual Intentions" - 5:19
7. "My Street" - 4:40

== Personnel ==
- Renee Scroggins – lead vocals
- Valerie Scroggins – drums
- Marie Scroggins – congas
- Chistelle Polite – guitar
- Nicole Nicholas – bass
