= Tier 3 (nightclub) =

Nightclub in Manhattan (1979–1980)

Coordinates: 40.7194°N 74.0060°W

Tier 3 (aka TR3) was an influential but short-lived 300-capacity no wave art nightclub in New York. Founded by Hilary Jaeger in 1979, Tier 3 was a major venue in the city's underground music and counterculture post-punk art scene, along with the Mudd Club. Live performances showcased punk rock, no wave, ska, noise music, free jazz, new wave and experimental music. The club was located at 225 West Broadway in the TriBeCa neighborhood of lower Manhattan.

No Wave music concert poster

Besides Hilary Jaeger, who booked the bands and ran Tier 3 (initially giving 100% of the door money to the bands), the DJs were Bob Gurevics and Simeon Gallu in addition to many guest DJs. The Lounge Lizards had one of their first gigs at Tier 3 and Lindzee Smith occasionally showed films of the No Wave Cinema on the third floor.

On the second floor, art and photography shows were hung. Kiki Smith, of Colab, painted a mural there. The third floor had a dance area lit by a disco ball. On the first floor, in the bar area, there was a DJ booth that Jean-Michel Basquiat had painted. Basquiat also painted a mural on the wall between the bar room and the music room on the first floor, that had only a 10" stage, due to the low ceilings throughout. This low stage offered an intimate, face to face, relationship between musicians and the audience.

Tier 3 closed in December 1980. Jaeger and her crew quit Tier 3 in December 1980 at around the same time the club received an eviction notice.

== Musical groups who performed at Tier 3 ==
- DNA
- Rhys Chatham
- Bush Tetras
- Arsenal
- The Bongos
- Boris Policeband
- Glenn Branca
- Madness
- Liquid Liquid
- The Slits
- World Saxophone Quartet
- Z'EV
- ESG
- The dB's
- Stimulators
- 8 Eyed Spy with Lydia Lunch
- The Raybeats
- Oliver Lake
- The Raincoats
- Robin Crutchfield's Dark Day
- Lounge Lizards
- Joseph Bowie
- Luther Thomas
- The Pop Group
- Delta 5
- Young Marble Giants
- Y Pants
- Ping Pong
- A Certain Ratio
- Bauhaus
- Mumps
- Stare Kits
- Student Teachers
- Swinging Madisons
- X

== Notes ==
- Alan Moore and Marc Miller, eds., ABC No Rio Dinero: The Story of a Lower East Side Art Gallery (Colab 1985)
- Marc Masters (2007), No Wave London, Black Dog Publishing
- Carlo McCormick, The Downtown Book: The New York Art Scene, 1974–1984, Princeton University Press, 2006
- Andy Schwartz, "RIP Tier 3", Perfect Sound Forever, 2008
