= Keep On Moving (ESG album) =

Studio album by ESG
- Released: July 4, 2006
- Genre: Electro-funk; R&B; dance-punk
- Length: 42:27
- Label: Soul Jazz Records
- Producer: Renee Scroggins

ESG chronology
| Step Off (2002) | Keep On Moving (2006) |

Keep On Moving is the third album by trio ESG.

Professional ratings
Aggregate scores
| Source | Rating |
|---|---|
| Metacritic | 71/100 |
Review scores
| Source | Rating |
| AllMusic | 2.5/5 stars |
| The Guardian | 3/5 stars |
| The Observer | 5/5 stars |
| Tiny Mix Tapes | 1/5 marks |

== Composition ==
Musically, Keep On Moving pulls in "bare-bones" electro-funk, as well as a "spare, quirky" R&B style. Tiny Mix Tapes saw its styles as dance-punk with some soul music added "for good measure".

== Personnel ==
Sourced from AllMusic.

ESG

- Renee Scroggins - vocals, hand percussion
- Marie Scroggins - background vocals, hand percussion
- Valerie Scroggins - background vocals, drums, percussion, timbales

=== Technical ===
- Renee Scroggins - producer
- Leroy Glover - engineer
