= Barbara Ess =

American photographer (1944–2021)

- Born: Barbara Eileen Schwartz; April 4, 1944; Brooklyn, New York City, US
- Died: March 4, 2021 (aged 76); Elizaville, New York, US
- Education: University of Michigan; London Film School
- Known for: large-scale pinhole photography post-punk no wave music
- Partner: Glenn Branca
- Awards: National Endowment for the Arts; Mid-Atlantic Arts Foundation

Barbara Ess (born Barbara Eileen Schwartz; April 4, 1944 – March 4, 2021) was an American pinhole camera photographer, No Wave musician and editor of Just Another Asshole. She taught photography at Bard College since 1997; who in 2024, along with the Schwartz family, has established an annual award to assist Bard College photography students in need called The Barbara Ess Fund for Artistic Expression in Photography.

== Education ==
Ess earned a B.A. at the University of Michigan in Ann Arbor and attended the London Film School.

== Photography ==
Ess was known primarily for her large-scale ambient and shadowy photographs that were often made with a pinhole camera. They usually were printed with just one earthy color, such as amber, or muted blue-black. They are shown internationally in solo and group exhibitions and reviewed extensively.

Her images are intentionally left vague and unresolved. As such, they initiate a range of emotions from dream anxiety and helplessness, to being captivated by a fantasy and the romantic aesthetic quality of her old-fashioned pinhole method. As The New York Times wrote in 2019, "Ms. Ess’s studied blurriness leaves in place only such facts as she can transmit with certainty."

Her pictures hark back to the nineteenth-century approach to fine-art photography known as Pictorialism and to the well-known amateur photographer Julia Margaret Cameron. The Pictorialists and Cameron often included nature, women, and children as subject matter, creating tableau vivant imagery that evoked moody, open-ended narratives. Ess received grants from LINE, Creative Artists Public Service Program, and Kitchen Media, and fellowships from Mid Atlantic Arts Foundation and the National Endowment for the Arts (photography).

An early solo exhibition of her photography work was presented at The New Museum of Contemporary Art in New York City in 1985, the same year she participated in a group exhibition entitled Currents that was held at the Institute of Contemporary Art, Boston. Ess also had a solo exhibition at The High Museum of Art in Atlanta in 1992 and one in 2003 at the Moore College of Art in Philadelphia. Other significant group shows that she participated in were Postmodern Prints at Victoria and Albert Museum in London in 1991 and the Bowery Tribute that was held at The New Museum of Contemporary Art in 2010. Posthumously, her photography work has been included in the exhibition Who You Staring At: Visual culture of the no wave scene in the 1970s and 1980s that was at the Centre Pompidou in Paris in 2023.

Of her intent as a photographer, Ess said "In a way I try to photograph what cannot be photographed."

== No Wave Music ==
Ess performed and recorded post-punk music with bands starting in 1978, including The Static, Disband, Y Pants and Ultra Vulva. She often performed at art galleries, at the Mudd Club and at Tier 3. Ess remained musically active throughout the 1980s, contributing tracks to Tellus Audio Cassette Magazine and collaborating in 2001 with filmmaker Peggy Ahwesh on Radio Guitar that was first published by the Ecstatic Peace! record label. Radio Guitar was re-published in 2004 by the Table of the Elements label.

== Editorial work: Just Another Asshole ==
Just Another Asshole was a no wave mixed media publication project launched from the Lower East Side of Manhattan from 1978 to 1987. Barbara Ess organized and edited seven issues of Just Another Asshole, which formed thanks to an open, collaborative submission process. Issues 3 and 4 were co-edited by Jane Sherry and issues 5 through 7 were co-edited by Glenn Branca. Issue formats include: zine, LP record, large format tabloid, magazine, exhibition catalog, and paperback book.

== Representation and Public Collections ==
The Estate of Barbara Ess is represented by the New York City gallery Magenta Plains. In 2019, Magenta Plains presented their first solo exhibition of Ess's work titled Someone To Watch Over Me followed by a second solo presentation of her work titled Inside Out in 2023.

Ess' work is in the collections of the Museum of Modern Art, the Museum of Contemporary Art Los Angeles, the Whitney Museum of American Art, the Centre Pompidou and the San Francisco Museum of Modern Art, among others.

== Bibliography ==
- I Am Not This Body: The Pinhole Photographs of Barbara Ess by Guy Armstrong, Michael Cunningham, Thurston Moore and Barbara Ess (June 15, 2005)

== See also ==
- No Wave
- Mudd Club
- Tier 3
