= A South Bronx Story =

Compilation album by ESG
- Released: May 8, 2000
- Recorded: 1981–1991
- Genre: Post-punk
- Length: 50:09
- Label: Universal Sound
- Producer: Various

ESG chronology
ESG Live! (1995)	A South Bronx Story (2000)	Step Off (2002)

Professional ratings
Review scores
Source	Rating
AllMusic	4.5/5 stars
NME	(8/10)
Spin	(9/10)

A South Bronx Story is a 2000 compilation album by rock band ESG. Prior to the release of A South Bronx Story, the band's back catalog had been almost impossible to find.

== Critical reception ==
The Village Voice wrote that the group's "drums’n’chants sound resembled a Mardi Gras Indian tribe or Yoruba percussion ensemble as much as the stripped-down funk that Prince and Cameo were pioneering." The Guardian wrote: "Bridging the gap between dance and punk (they once appeared on the same bill as Grandmaster Funk and the Clash), their sound was utterly their own, as this compilation of material from 1980–87 attests."

It ranked #7 on Spin's list of the top 10 reissues of 2000.

== Track listing ==
- all songs written by ESG
1. "You're No Good" – 3:12
2. "Moody" – 2:48
3. "UFO" – 2:56
4. "It's Alright" – 2:39
5. "Moody (Spaced Out)" – 4:18
6. "Tiny Sticks" – 3:03
7. "My Love For You" – 2:55
8. "Come Away" – 3:14
9. "Dance" – 4:32
10. "Parking Lot Blues" – 2:54
11. "Chistelle" – 1:54
12. "About You" – 2:05
13. "Erase You" – 4:08
14. "Get Funky" – 2:35
15. "Hold Me Right" – 2:56
16. "I Can't Tell You What To Do" – 4:06

== Personnel ==
- Deborah Scroggins – bass, vocals
- Renee Scroggins – lead vocals, guitar
- Valerie Scroggins – drums, vocals
- Marie Scroggins – congas, vocals
- Tito Libran – congas
