= Johnny Boy =

English indie pop band

- Also known as: Gabriel
- Origin: Liverpool, England
- Genres: Indie pop
- Years active: 2002–2006
- Labels: Boobytrap Records, Vertigo, Mercury, Wild Kingdom
- Past members: Lolly Hayes, Andrew Davitt (Davo)

Johnny Boy were an English indie pop band from Liverpool and London which consisted of two member: Lolly Hayes (Lorraine Hayward) and the Liverpudlian keyboardist Andrew Davitt from the Welsh band Manic Street Preachers. Both of them, when asked about their roles in the duo, commonly specified them by giving the generic answer of "Vocals, loops and guitars".

== Biography ==
Formed in 2002, Johnny Boy took their name from Robert De Niro’s character in Martin Scorsese's film, Mean Streets. Their debut single, "Johnny Boy Theme" featured Scorsese's opening voice-over from the film.

Their single "You Are The Generation That Bought More Shoes And You Get What You Deserve" was produced by James Dean Bradfield (of Manic Street Preachers) and achieved critical acclaim. The single reached #50 in the UK Singles Chart in August 2004. Bradfield also co-produced their debut album, Johnny Boy, which received mixed reviews.

Johnny Boy described their sound as "Church bells, boy-girl vocals, loops, twists, warps, walls of sound and edgy guitars combined to rekindle the idea of Sandinista!-era Clash having an, erm, shootout with Phil Spector".

== Discography ==
=== Singles ===
- "Johnny Boy Theme" (2003)
- "You Are the Generation that Bought More Shoes and You Get What You Deserve" (2004)

=== Albums ===
- Johnny Boy (2006)

== See also ==
- Johnny Boy Soprano
