= Y Pants =

American all-female no wave band

- 1979 Y Pants poster for Tier 3 performance

Background information
- Origin: New York City, U.S.
- Genres: No wave, art rock, post-punk, noise music
- Years active: 1979–1982
- Labels: 99 Records, Neutral Records
- Past members: Barbara Ess; Virginia Piersol; Gail Vachon

Y Pants were an American all-female no wave band from New York City active from 1979 to 1982. The trio, made up of photographer/musician Barbara Ess, visual artist Virginia Piersol (aka Virge Piersol), and filmmaker Gail Vachon, developed a unique sound via their acoustic toy instrumentation of toy piano, ukulele and a paper-headed Mickey Mouse drum kit, augmented by electric bass guitar, Casio keyboards and various low-tech effects.

Y Pants' feminist poetics and toy instrumentation made them a hit in Manhattans's art gallery scene, while their No Wave clout brought them to be regulars at punk rock venues like CBGB's. In 1980, Glenn Branca recorded their debut 4-song EP for 99 Records, followed by an LP two years later. Lyrically, most of the Y-Pants' material covered the off-kilter aspects of relationships, with explorations into the perils of laundry ("Favorite Sweater"), materialism ("We Have Everything"), patriarchy ("That's The Way Boys Are"), and a reworking of Bertolt Brecht's "Barbara's Song" from Threepenny Opera. Musically they have been compared to their British post-punk contemporaries The Raincoats for their overlapping vocal choruses and kitchen-sinkish approach to sound, rhythm and composition.

Novelist and critic Lynne Tillman wrote the lyrics for the band's song "Obvious."

Y-Pants disbanded shortly after the release of their album, reportedly reuniting each year on the various band members' birthdays. Barbara Ess remained musically active throughout the 1980s, frequently contributing tracks to Tellus Audio Cassette Magazine and collaborating with Peggy Ahwesh on 2001's Radio Guitar for the Ecstatic Peace! label.

== Discography ==
- "Little Music EP" (99 Records, 1980)
- Beat It Down LP (Neutral Records, 1982)
- "Magnetic Attraction" (song recorded in 1980 and released in 1988 on Tellus Audio Cassette Magazine No. 21: "Audio By Visual Artists"')
- Y Pants CD (Periodic Document, 1998, collects all of the above recordings)
