= White Lines (Don't Don't Do It) =

1983 single by Melle Mel

Single by Melle Mel
- B-side: "Melle Mel's Groove"
- Released: 1983
- Genre: Old-school hip hop
- Length: 7:38
- Label: Sugar Hill
- Songwriters: Melvin Glover; Sylvia Robinson
- Producers: Sylvia Robinson; Melle Mel; Joey Robinson Jr.

"White Lines (Don't Don't Do It)" is a song by American hip hop recording artist Melle Mel, released as a 12-inch single in 1983 on Sugar Hill Records. The song, which warns against the dangers of cocaine, addiction, and drug smuggling, is one of Melle Mel's signature tracks. It was written by him with Sylvia Robinson. The bassline is taken from a performance of the Sugar Hill house band (featuring bassist Doug Wimbish) covering "Cavern", a single by the New York City band Liquid Liquid.

== Overview ==
When originally released on Sugar Hill Records, the record was credited to Grandmaster & Melle Mel (some international issues carried the credit Grandmaster Flash & Melle Mel). By this time, Grandmaster Flash had already stopped touring with Mel and was suing Sugar Hill Records for back royalties. The animosity between the two artists continued well into the future.

"White Lines" peaked at No. 47 on the Billboard Hot Black Singles chart in 1983. The song fared better in the United Kingdom, reaching number 7 on the UK Singles Chart in July 1984, spending 17 consecutive weeks in the top 40. It was the 13th best-selling single of 1984 in the UK, selling more than several number one hits that year.

The song was co-written by Melle Mel and Sylvia Robinson. Originally, it was intended to be an ironic celebration of a cocaine-fueled party lifestyle, but it was abridged with the "don't do it" message as a concession to commercial considerations.

The lines "A businessman is caught with 24 kilos / He's out on bail and out of jail and that's the way it goes" refers to car manufacturer John DeLorean, who in 1982 became entrapped in a scheme to save his company from bankruptcy using drug money. Some of the lyrics in "White Lines" ("something like a phenomenon") echoed lyrics from the song "Cavern" by Liquid Liquid ("slip in and out of phenomenon"), in addition to the note-by-note appropriation of the bass line from "Cavern" with a rapping track overlaid. Sugar Hill did not get proper clearance to use "Cavern", resulting in years of lawsuits, ultimately in Liquid Liquid's favor. As a result of the $600,000 judgment against Sugar Hill, the label declared bankruptcy to circumvent paying the judgment.

An unofficial music video was directed by Spike Lee, then a New York University film student, and starred actor Laurence Fishburne.

== Legacy and sampling ==
"White Lines" had been heavily sampled in the years following with the bassline being prominently heard on Mobb Deep's "Quiet Storm" (1999) and 112's "It's Over Now" (2000).

In 2017, Rolling Stone magazine ranked "White Lines (Don't Don't Do It)" number 55 in their list of "100 Greatest Hip-Hop Songs of All Time". In 2023, rapper Pusha T remade the song in promotion for the film Cocaine Bear, retitling it "White Lines (Cocaine Bear Remix)", keeping the chorus, but replacing the original verses with his personally written lyrics.

== Charts ==
=== Weekly charts ===
Chart (1983–1984)	Peak position
Australia (Kent Music Report)	27
Belgium (Ultratop 50 Flanders)	27
Ireland (IRMA)	22
Netherlands (Single Top 100)	40
New Zealand (Recorded Music NZ)	45
UK Singles (Official Charts)	7
US Hot Black Singles (Billboard)	47
US Hot Dance Club Play (Billboard)	9
US Bubbling Under Hot 100 Singles (Billboard)	101

=== Year-end charts ===
Chart (1984)	Position
UK Singles (Gallup)	13

== Duran Duran version ==
"White Lines (Don't Do It)"

Single by Duran Duran

from the album Thank You
- B-side: "Save a Prayer"; "None of the Above"
- Released: March 29, 1995
- Genre: Rap rock
- Length: 5:31
- Label: EMI; Capitol
- Songwriters: Melle Mel; Sylvia Robinson

Duran Duran singles chronology
"Perfect Day" (1995)	"White Lines (Don't Do It)" (1995)	"Out of My Mind" (1997)

Music video
- "White Lines (Don't Do It)" on YouTube

A cover version of "White Lines" featuring performances from Grandmaster Flash and Melle Mel was released in March 1995 by EMI and Capitol Records as the second single from English new wave band Duran Duran's eighth studio album, Thank You (1995). The single reached No. 17 on the UK Singles Chart, No. 5 on the US Billboard Dance Club Play chart, No. 20 in Australia and No. 31 in New Zealand. The band continues to perform the song as a regular part of their live set.

More than 20 distinct remixes and edits of "White Lines" were produced for promotional releases, many of which were crafted by DJ Junior Vasquez. Apart from the singles and the Thank You album, the song also appeared as a B-side on the first single from the album, "Perfect Day".

A black-and-white music video was shot in January 1995 by Nick Egan, featuring Duran Duran, Melle Mel, and the Furious Five performing the song accompanied by breakdancers and people in skeleton masks.

On July 8, 2009, The Late Late Show with Craig Ferguson did a lip sync version of the Duran Duran cover featuring puppets on backing vocals.

=== Critical reception ===
Steve Baltin from Cash Box wrote, "England's favorite former pretty boys have taken to the streets for the first single from their long-in-the-works album of covers entitled Thank You. To lend validity to the song the group, now a quartet, enlisted Grandmaster Flash and the Furious Five as well as Melle Mel to lend background vocals. While the combination may sound frightening, the song has already picked up major adds at Modern Rock, and following the success of their last album, should also get Top 40 airplay."

Dave Sholin from the Gavin Report felt that "at first this Grandmaster Flash classic and Duran Duran seem like an unlikely pairing, but it won't after you hear the finished work. This first release from an album of covers [...] is an exceptional effort." Mark Morris from Select said, "Very incongruous, but no more so that these legendary '80s jet-setters massacring Grandmaster Flash's unequivocal anti-coke anthem, 'White Lines'. An instant camp classic. Just don't try listening to it." Tony Cross from Smash Hits gave it one out of five, writing, "So if you like berks from the '80s ruining one of glam-disco rap-funk's finest moments, then go ahead and buy it."

=== Charts ===
Chart (1995)	Peak position
Australia (ARIA)	20
Canada Top Singles (RPM)	28
Canada Dance/Urban (RPM)	14
Europe (European Hit Radio)	40
Israel (IBA)	6
Italy Airplay (Music & Media)	3
Netherlands (Dutch Top 40 Tipparade)	12
Netherlands (Single Top 100 Tipparade)	17
New Zealand (Recorded Music NZ)	31
Scottish Singles Sales (Official Charts)	23
Spain Airplay (Top 40 Radio)	39
UK Singles (Official Charts)	17
UK Pop Tip Club Chart (Music Week)	7
US Hot Dance Club Play (Billboard)	5
US Cash Box Top 100	55

=== Release history ===
Region	Date	Format(s)	Label(s)	Ref.
Japan	March 29, 1995	Mini-CD	EMI	
Australia	April 17, 1995	CD	Parlophone; EMI	
United Kingdom	June 5, 1995	CD1; cassette	Parlophone	
United Kingdom	June 12, 1995	CD2	Parlophone	
