= Johnny Boy (album) =

Studio album by Johnny Boy
- Released: April 13, 2006
- Genre: Indie pop
- Label: Wild Kingdom
- Producers: James Dean Bradfield, Dave Eringa, Johnny Boy

Professional ratings
Review scores
Source	Rating
Pitchfork Media	5.2/10 link

Johnny Boy is the 2006 debut album by British indie pop duo Johnny Boy. It contains their previously released singles "You Are the Generation That Bought More Shoes and You Get What You Deserve" and "Johnny Boy Theme".

The album was co-produced by James Dean Bradfield of Manic Street Preachers.

== Critical response ==
NME gave the album 5/10, finding nothing lived up to their debut single. Pitchfork agreed, giving it 5.2/10; they also criticised the limited range of singer Lolly.

== Track listing ==
1. "You Are the Generation That Bought More Shoes and You Get What You Deserve"
2. "Wall Street"
3. "Fifteen Minutes"
4. "Livin' in the City"
5. "War on Want"
6. "Springer"
7. "All Exits Final"
8. "Formaldehyde (Last Words of Lottery Loser)"
9. "Bonnie Parker's 115th Dream"
10. "Johnny Boy Theme"
