= The Gynecologists =

American punk rock band

- Origin: New York City, New York, United States
- Genres: No wave
- Years active: 1976–1978
- Past members: Rhys Chatham; Robert Appleton; Nina Canal; Daile Kaplan; Jim Sclavunos

The Gynecologists were a no wave band based in SoHo, Manhattan. The band was founded in 1976 by composer Rhys Chatham and artist Robert Appleton.

Chatham was originally inspired to start a band when composer Peter Gordon took him to see the Ramones for his first punk rock concert. Chatham wanted to combine the punk rock sound with the minimalist compositions he was making. In addition to composing, he was the music director for The Kitchen. They added guitarist Nina Canal, who had little musical experience and bought a Fender Stratocaster. Photographer Daile Kaplan, using the pseudonym "Heddy Van Dyke", became the band's drummer. Following the Gynecologists' first performance, Chatham left the group and joined a band named Arsenal so that he could focus on learning to play rock guitar. Kaplan was later replaced by Jim Sclavunos, whom the band knew from his work for NO Magazine. Brian Eno invited Chatham to contribute to his 1978 No New York compilation, but Chatham missed their recording session. The Gynecologists' biggest performance was at a May 1978 festival with Theoretical Girls at Artists Space. The group disbanded shortly after, with Sclavunos joining Teenage Jesus and the Jerks and Canal co-founding Ut.
