= Ed Bahlman =

American record executive

Ed Bahlman (born 1950) is the American founder of 99 Records, the postpunk label from New York, home to ESG and Liquid Liquid. He also ran an independent record shop of the same name at 99 MacDougal Street in New York City, an iconic import record store. Bahlman was born in Brooklyn, New York. In his mid-20s, Bahlman was an occasional club DJ and soundman with an omnivorous taste for cutting-edge music, known for his strong work ethic and an intense passion for music, especially new and underground music that was not wholly embraced by the mainstream or even punk establishments.

== 1980 - 1984 ==
99 (pronounced Nine Nine) specialised in Indie/dub/new wave music and was founded in 1980. 99 was set up in a corner of Bahlman's girlfriend's (Gina Franklyn) clothing store in Greenwich Village. 99 imported records from Rough Trade in London, and had on its label artists such as ESG, Liquid Liquid, Vivien Goldman, Bush Tetras, The Congos, Y Pants and Glenn Branca. Terry Tolkin, later an Elektra Records vice president and No.6 Records label head, worked there. Bahlman actively participated in the production and mixing of many of the 99 releases.

The shop became a popular venue for musicians and music fans who were interested in new wave music. Customers included Thurston Moore, Rick Rubin, Vivien Goldman and Nick Cave. Indeed, Bahlman mentored Rick Rubin and helped him distribute the initial Def Jam releases. Since its demise in 1984, the reputation of the 99 label and that of its groups has steadily grown. In its very short tenure, 99 Records turned out some of the most sampled records of all times.

99 closed in 1984 after a litigation case with Sugar Hill Gang where music sampling rights were contended:

"Bahlman sued Sugar Hill as "White Lines," whose writing credit listed only Melle Mel and Sugar Hill co-owner Sylvia Robinson, became a huge hit. Though he eventually won a lengthy court case and set an early precedent in the still poorly defined realm of sampling law, the results were disastrous for all involved. Sugar Hill declared bankruptcy rather than pay the ordered $600,000 settlement; faced with enormous legal costs and disillusioned with the music business, Bahlman folded 99 Records." Ezra Gale,

== After 99 Records ==
Bahlman did not return to the music industry after the demise of 99 and has become somewhat elusive since the demise of the label, although the records he produced at 99 have become extremely valuable and are highly sought after. Despite only 15 releases in less than five years of existence, 99 was among the most influential independent labels of its era.

Bahlman currently lives in Brooklyn with his partner Anne-Katrin Titze who teaches literature at Hunter College, and is passionate about wildlife conservation.
