= Neutral Records =

- Founded: Late 1970s
- Founder: Glenn Branca
- Genre: No Wave; Post-punk
- Country of origin: United States
- Location: New York, New York

Neutral Records is an independent record label. Glenn Branca ran the label during the No Wave and post-punk scene on the Lower East Side, New York City, in the late 1970s and early 1980s. Among their releases were Filth by Swans and early Sonic Youth albums including Confusion Is Sex.

== Sources ==
- Article by Alan Licht about Glenn Branca mentioning Neutral Records.
