= ESG (band) =

American band

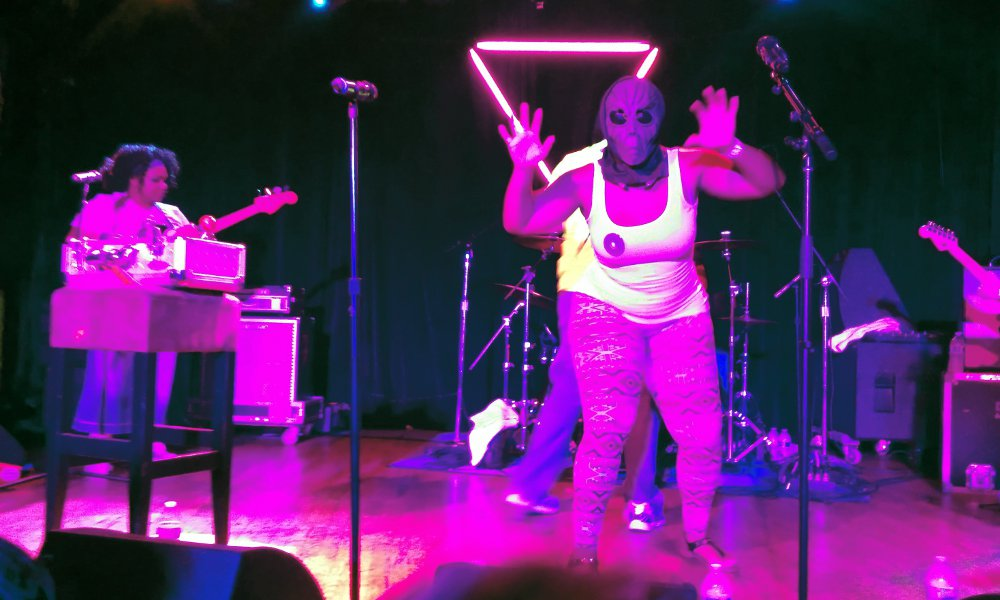
- ESG performing in 2015

Background information
- Origin: The Bronx, New York City, U.S.
- Genres: Dance-punk; funk
- Years active: 1977–1985; 1991–2007; 2008–present
- Labels: 99, Factory, Soul Jazz, Fire, Universal Sound, ESG Records
- Members: Renee Scroggins; Marie Scroggins; Nicole Nicholas; Nicholas D. Nicholas; Michael Giordano
- Past members: Valerie Scroggins; Deborah Scroggins; Chistelle Polite; Leroy Glover; Tito Libran; David Miles

ESG (Emerald, Sapphire & Gold) is an American dance punk/funk/rock band formed in the South Bronx in 1977. ESG has been influential across a wide range of musical genres, including hip hop, and dance-punk. The band's track "UFO" is one of the most sampled songs in history.

== History ==
The band originally consisted of the Scroggins sisters, Renee (vocals), Valerie (drums), Deborah (bass) and Marie (congas, vocals) and friend Tito Libran (congas, vocals). The band's name stands for emerald, sapphire, and gold. Emerald and sapphire are Valerie and Renee Scroggins' birthstones, and gold refers to the record certification. Ed Bahlman discovered ESG while serving as the judge for a talent show and became the band's unofficial manager.

Tony Wilson from Factory Records approached the band after a performance at Hurrah on the Upper West Side of Manhattan, and three days later they began recording with Martin Hannett in Manchester, England. They recorded "Moody" and "You're No Good" in their first session. Hannett had three minutes left on the master tape, so he had the band record "UFO". The recordings helped bring Bahlman's focus to the band. On December 3, 1980, he recorded ESG's performance at Hurrah, which became the B-side for ESG. Bahlman formed a partnership with Factory so that his 99 Records label could release the EP in 1981. In July, they made a second pressing of the record. It was received positively by music critics. Robert Palmer called it one of 1981's "freshest records". The New York Times placed ESG second on its list of the best EPs and cassettes of 1981, and The Village Voice placed the EP third on its Pazz & Jop critics' poll.

1982's ESG Says Dance to the Beat of Moody EP continued in a similar vein, as did their first album, 1983's Come Away with ESG. Renee Scroggins retains the rights to ESG's new music and publishing. The group's work had become popular, mainly among hip-hop artists searching for samples, with such acts as TLC, the Wu-Tang Clan, Kool Moe Dee, the Beastie Boys, Big Daddy Kane, Gang Starr, Junior Mafia, Tricky, Jay-Dee, MF Doom, as well as indie rockers like Unrest and Liars all sampling the group. The group addressed this issue on the 1992 12" EP Sample Credits Don't Pay Our Bills. The album, ESG Live!, was released in 1995 and featured both old and new material.

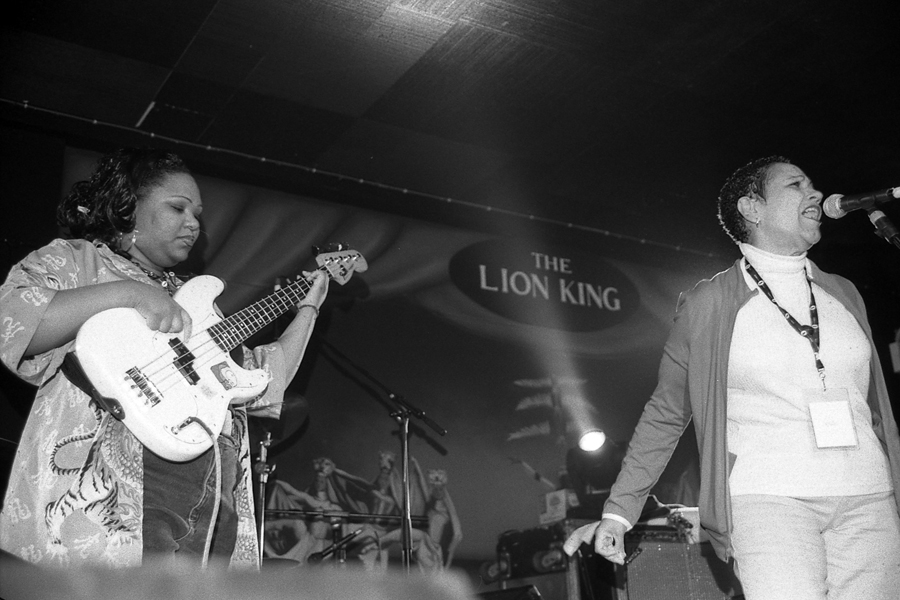
ESG performing in 2014

ESG announced shows in Sweden and France in September, 2011. To celebrate Analator, an ESG show in March 2012 was announced as their final west coast show to promote their 2012 album Closure. ESG still continue to tour, primarily performing in London. In September 2017, ESG released the album What More Can You Take? which was billed upon release as their final studio album.

== Style and influences ==
ESG's sound incorporates elements from funk, hip-hop and punk music. The group has been described as being "driven by economical drumming, tersely phrased bass, and minimal [...] guitar." Lead vocalist Renee Scroggins has cited James Brown as a major influence, in particular when his songs "take it to the bridge"—Scroggins described these instrumental sections as "that giant bass and the drums and letting it rip for that instant [...] so I said, man, if you could just take a song and make it just the bridge, wouldn't that be hot!"

Renee Scroggins has said that ESG's sound is influenced by the Latin music she and her sisters would hear in the neighbourhood when they were growing up. She doesn't define the band as one genre, saying "if I really had to put a label on it, we consider it to be music that makes you dance.".

== Legacy and influence ==
LCD Soundsystem's James Murphy, comparing ESG to post-punk band The Fall, said that "both of them do things that are almost impossible to copy. They’re irreducible."

Jennifer Herrema, singer for alternative rock duo Royal Trux, noted the band as an influence on her, calling their music "not just any one thing...it's its own thing."

Neil Finn, who plays in Crowded House and Fleetwood Mac, was inspired by the "simple and down-home" sound of ESG to form his band Pajama Club, saying that "[ESG] gave us encouragement to be funky, when we really had no right to be."

David Best, lead singer of Fujiya & Miyagi, cited ESG's minimalism as one of his influences, saying "[i]f there was a blueprint for our group's sound, a large chunk of it would come from ESG."

Karen O of the Yeah Yeah Yeahs said their first EP "was largely Nick and I trying to be like ESG but with guitar instead of bass."

== Discography ==
=== Albums ===
- 1983: Come Away with ESG
- 2002: Step Off
- 2006: Keep on Moving

=== Live albums ===
- 1995: ESG Live!

=== EPs ===
- 1981: ESG
- 1982: ESG Says Dance to the Beat of Moody
- 1992: Sample Credits Don't Pay Our Bills

=== Compilations ===
- 1991: ESG
- 2000: A South Bronx Story
- 2007: A South Bronx Story 2 – Collector's edition: Rarities
- 2010: Dance to the Best of ESG

=== Appearances ===
- 2010: Renee Scroggins appears on Gaëtan Roussel's Ginger album
  - track 03- Si l'on comptait les étoiles.
  - track 08- DYWD
- 2011: Franz Ferdinand – Covers
