= Liquid Liquid =

American dance-punk group

- Origin: New York City, U.S.
- Genres: Dance-punk; post-no wave; avant-funk
- Years active: 1980–1983, 2008–present
- Labels: 99, Mo' Wax
- Members: Scott Hartley; Richard McGuire; Sal Principato; Dennis Young

Liquid Liquid is an American dance-punk group, originally active from 1980 to 1983. They are best known for their track "Cavern," which was covered—without proper permission or attribution—by the Sugar Hill Records house band as the backing track for Melle Mel's old school rap classic "White Lines (Don't Don't Do It)." The group released a series of extended plays, including the acclaimed 1983 12" EP Optimo. In 2008, the band reformed and have played in multiple countries.

== History ==
Liquid Liquid was formed by the members of the New York "primitive punk band" Liquid Idiot (Sal Principato, Richard McGuire, Scott Hartley, and Dennis Young). McGuire recalled that they changed the name from the punk-resonant "Liquid Idiot" to "Liquid Liquid", which had undertones of "slippery grooviness". In 1981, the band released their self-titled debut EP, which according to author Tim Lawrence, "combined the Bo Diddley beat, the rototoms in Curtis Mayfield's "Super Fly", the percussive crescendos of Fela Kuti, the subtractive spatial dimension of dub reggae, and the deconstructive rock of DNA."

Liquid Liquid often played at the gay black and latino scene clubs like Paradise Garage, as well as the more heterosexual latino scene at Funhouse, The Roxy, and Monster Movie Club. Liquid Liquid, alongside Treacherous Three, played in Rick Rubin's 1982 "Uptown Meets Downtown" event.

One of their most famous songs, "Cavern", originally appeared on the EP Optimo recorded by Don Hünerberg. The song's bassline and lyrics were copied by Grandmaster + Melle Mel's old school rap classic, "White Lines (Don't Don't Do It)" changing the words "slip in and out of phenomenon" to “something like a phenomenon". 99 Records took Sugarhill to court over its unauthorized use, and after an expensive court battle, won compensation. Before they could collect, however, Sugarhill went into bankruptcy. The members of Liquid Liquid started earning royalties after Duran Duran covered "White Lines" in 1995. In aftermath, Principato recalled that he couldn't get angry, "given what a big influence Grandmaster Flash was on him—[he] was partly flattered, partly flabbergasted, partly confused".

"Cavern" was also included on the Disco Not Disco compilation album. The first three EPs, plus live material, were reissued in 1997 by Grand Royal (US) and Mo' Wax (UK). After the collapse of both these labels, Domino Records released the music from all three original 12"s plus extra tracks and early live recordings as Slip In And Out Of Phenomenon in 2008. The song was used in a Samsung S21 Ultra commercial.

In October 2008 the band returned to the UK after a prolonged hiatus, playing at London's Barbican Theatre alongside the Glasgow-based DJ duo Optimo, who named themselves after the eponymous Liquid Liquid song and EP. Liquid Liquid performed in 2009 at the Villette Sonique Festival in Paris, as well as in Lincoln Center, where they followed the 200 Guitar Orchestra. On April 2, 2010, the band performed "Cavern" with The Roots on Late Night with Jimmy Fallon and announced they were to play more shows in Britain, at the Offset Festival and ATP Release The Bats in London. On April 2, 2011, LCD Soundsystem played their farewell gig at Madison Square Garden in New York City with Liquid Liquid as supporting act.

== Musical style ==
According to music critic Mark Fisher, Liquid Liquid's music is essentially groove-based and influenced by a variety of sources, including funk, dub reggae, Afrobeat, and punk in its do-it-yourself garage approach. Their songs do not follow standard pop song form, having no defined verses or chorus. Vocalist Salvatore Principato is known to use his voice as an instrument, focusing more on pitch and rhythm than words and lyrics, which were presumably inspired by Peruvian soprano Yma Sumac. Larissa Wodtke described the band as dance-punk and avant-funk. Observer characterized them as post-no wave.

The Observer journalist, Tim Sommer believed: "Liquid Liquid are polyrhythmic but never remotely an ethnic forgery .... This restraint, this refusal to funk, makes them virtually impossible to imitate."

== Band members ==
- Salvatore Principato - vocals, percussion (1980–1983, 2008–present)
- Dennis Young - guitar, marimba, keyboards (1980–1983, 2008–present)
- Richard McGuire - bass, keyboards (1980–1983, 2008–present)
- Scott Hartley - drums, percussion (1980–1983, 2008–present)

=== Solo projects ===
McGuire is a graphic designer, cartoonist, and filmmaker. Principato produces remixes and often tours as a DJ and Young plays in various musical projects.

== Discography ==
- Liquid Liquid 12" EP (99–07, 1981)
- Successive Reflexes 12" EP (99-09 1981)
- "Bellhead"/"Push" 7" single (99-11EP7, 1981 - extremely rare record of re-recordings by Liquid Liquid, recorded, mixed & mastered in one day - November 24, 1981. The band destroyed most copies and it was never made available, but some still exist.)
- Optimo 12" EP (99–11, 1983)
- "Dig We Must" 12" (99-LL1, 1984)
- Liquid Liquid 2xLP/CD (Mo Wax/Grand Royal, 1997)
- Slip In and Out of Phenomenon 3xLP/CD (Domino Records, 2008)

DJ Bill Bahlman spun his mix of new wave, dance punk and electro at most of Liquid Liquid NYC shows. He also recorded many of these live shows. These live tapes were incorporated into the studio EPs.
