= Theoretical Girls =

American no wave band

- Origin: New York City, New York, U.S.
- Genres: No wave, experimental music, post-punk, noise music
- Years active: 1977–1981
- Labels: Atavistic Records, Acute Records
- Past members: Glenn Branca; Jeff Lohn

Theoretical Girls were a New York-based no wave band formed by Glenn Branca and conceptual artist and composer Jeff Lohn that existed from 1977 to 1981. Theoretical Girls played only about 20 shows (three of which took place in Paris).

The band released one single ("U.S. Millie"/"You Got Me") and was signed by Acute/Car Park records. Theoretical Girls is well regarded as an early leading no wave group that mixed classical modern ideas of composition with punk rock noise music. This experimental music was mostly supported by the New York art world and minimal art music audience.

== History ==
"I came [to New York City] to do theater. And I was in the process of actually setting up a whole theater situation with a friend of mine named Jeff Lohn. He had a loft in SoHo. We were painting the place black and, at one point I just couldn't help myself and I decided I just wanted to start a fucking band. It got to the point where basically we kinda decided that we can, we're on a stage in front of an audience we can basically use. This band is our theater group so to speak. That - that was Theoretical Girls."

— Glenn Branca explaining the origins of Theoretical Girls in S.A. Crary's art punk documentary, Kill Your Idols

Theoretical Girls was formed after Branca and Lohn's previous group The Static folded. Theoretical Girls performed its first show at the Experimental Intermedia Foundation. Artist Jeff Wall came up with the band's name during a discussion of women making conceptual art.

The Theoretical Girls were among the most enigmatic of the late 1970s no wave bands of the New York underground art rock scene, famous not so much for their music, since they released only one single during their brief existence, but because the group launched the careers of two of New York's best known experimental music figures, composer Glenn Branca and producer Wharton Tiers. The latter played drums, the former guitar in the quartet, which also featured keyboardist Margaret De Wys and vocalist/guitarist Jeffrey Lohn, a classically trained composer who, like Branca and so many others in the no wave scene, wasn't interested in working with popular musical forms until inspired to do so by the explosion of punk rock. The group's sound shared aesthetics with the other no wave bands working in Manhattan at the time, such as The Contortions and DNA.

Confrontational and often funny in an aggressive way, the band's sound consistently displayed the influence of American minimalist music composers, such as La Monte Young, ranging from sparse, clattering rhythm pieces that sound like immediate forebears of early 1980s Sonic Youth, to abrasive drone slabs of art-punk noise music.

Two recordings subsequent to the dissolution of the band have emerged in recent years, helping to preserve the band's legacy. The first, which came out on Atavistic in 1995, consists of all the Glenn Branca-penned songs, including "You Got Me", the flip-side from the group's only single. The A-side, "U.S. Millie," appears on a newer collection of Theoretical Girls songs all written by Lohn. That compendium owes its existence to Acute Records proprietor Daniel Selzer, who spent several years collaborating with Lohn to compile the songs, working from poorly recorded old rehearsal tapes and live reels.

After Theoretical Girls folded, Lohn released an LP entitled Music From Paradise in 1984 on Daisy Records; some of which was used in a contemporary dance performance by Karole Armitage.

== Legacy ==
Theoretical Girls were featured in 2023 at the Centre Pompidou in a Nicolas Ballet curated exhibition entitled Who You Staring At: Culture visuelle de la scène no wave des années 1970 et 1980 (Visual culture of the no wave scene in the 1970s and 1980s).

== Discography ==
=== Single ===
- Theoretical Girls: You Got Me (Branca)/U.S. Millie (Lohn) 7" single, (Theoretical Records, 1978)

=== Collections ===
- Branca: The Static & Theoretical Girls: Songs '77-'79, (Atavistic Records, 1995)
  compiles live and studio recordings by The Static and Theoretical Girls 1977-1979
- Theoretical Girls: Theoretical Record, (Acute Records, 2002)
  compiles most known recorded work of Theoretical Girls

=== Compilation appearances ===
- Various Artists - Out of Their Mouths (1996, Atavistic Records)
  song: "You Got Me"
- Various Artists - New York Noise (2003, Soul Jazz Records)
  song: "You Got Me"
- DVD 135 Grand Street, New York, 1979 by Ericka Beckman

== See also ==
- Just Another Asshole
- Parenthetical Girls
- Mudd Club
- Tier 3
