= Glenn Branca =

American composer and guitarist (1948–2018)

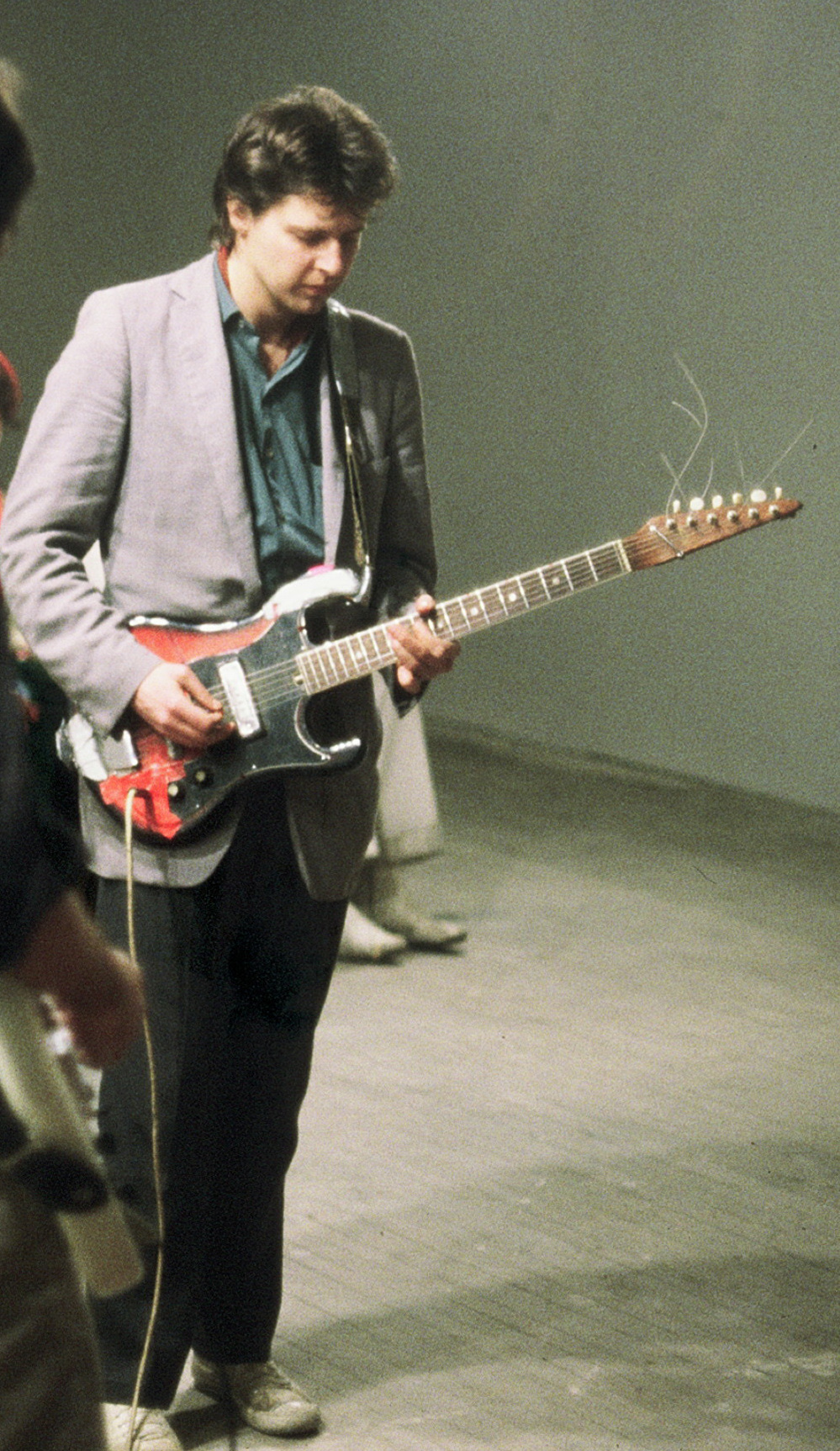
- Branca performing at Hallwalls (circa 1980)
- Born: October 6, 1948; Harrisburg, Pennsylvania, U.S.
- Died: May 13, 2018 (aged 69); New York City, U.S.
- Occupations: Composer, musician, luthier, playwright

Glenn Branca (October 6, 1948 – May 13, 2018) was an American avant-garde composer, guitarist, and luthier. Known for his use of volume, alternative guitar tunings, repetition, droning, and the harmonic series, he was a driving force behind the genres of no wave, totalism and noise rock. Branca received a 2009 Foundation for Contemporary Arts Grants to Artists Award.

== Life and work ==
=== Beginnings: 1960s and early 1970s ===
Born in Harrisburg, Pennsylvania, Branca started playing the guitar at age 15. He also created a number of tape sound art collage pieces for his own amusement. After attending York College in 1966–1967, he started the short-lived cover band The Crystal Ship with Al Whiteside and Dave Speece in the summer of 1967. In the early 1970s, Branca studied theater at Emerson College in Boston. In 1973, he moved from Boston to London with his then girlfriend Meg English.

After moving back to Boston in 1974, he met John Rehberger. While there, he began experimenting with sound as the founder of an experimental theater group called Bastard Theatre in 1975. Working out of a loft on Massachusetts Avenue they wrote and produced the music/theater piece Anthropophagoi for a two-week run. In 1976, The Bastard Theatre's second production was What Actually Happened at a new loft in Central Square, Cambridge and later at The Boston Arts Group. Considering the unconventional and sometimes confrontational nature of the productions, the shows still received interested reviews from the The Phoenix and The Boston Globe. All music for Bastard Theatre productions were original compositions by Branca or Rehberger and were performed live by the actor/musicians.

=== New York: Late 1970s and 1980s ===
The Static, Theoretical Record (1979) produced by Dan Graham

In 1976, Branca moved to New York City to continue in experimental theater. He encountered the N. Dodo Band and watched their rehearsals in Chelsea, hoping to use the space for a theater production. Branca spent time with one of its members, Jeffrey Lohn, who introduced him to bands such as Suicide. The two began forming a theater group when Branca decided he wanted to form a band, which he called The Static and later Theoretical Girls. Branca put up posters to recruit members, and after seeing one of the posters, Lohn expressed interest.

Lohn's girlfriend Margaret De Wys joined the band as its bassist, and they borrowed drummer Mike Anthol from the N. Dodo Band. Artist Dan Graham booked the band at Franklin Furnace for its first performance. The group reformed in 1977 with Wharton Tiers as its drummer. Branca also recorded Barbara Ess's band Y Pants for their debut release on 99 Records and performed with Rhys Chatham's Guitar Trio on occasion from 1977 to 1979, a noise music experience that was very important in the development of his compositional voice (Branca 1979). In 1982, Branca launched his own record label, Neutral Records, releasing Y Pants' LP and the first few records by New York noise rockers Sonic Youth.

In 1978, Branca participated in the inception of the No Wave movement by participating twice in a five night no wave music festival at Artists Space organized by artists Michael Zwack and Robert Longo. It featured ten post-punk New York City bands; including Rhys Chatham's The Gynecologists, Communists, Branca's Theoretical Girls, Terminal, Chatham's Tone Death (performing his composition for electric guitars Guitar Trio) and Branca's Daily Life (with Barbara Ess, Paul McMahon and Christine Hahn).

In the early 1980s, Branca released his first album under his own name, Lesson No. 1. In the same year, he composed several medium-length compositions for electric guitar ensembles, including The Ascension (1981) and Indeterminate Activity of Resultant Masses (1981). The Ascension appeared on his second same titled solo album in 1981, Indeterminate Activity of Resultant Masses wasn't released until 2008.

Soon after these two compositions, he began composing symphonies for orchestras of electric guitars and percussion, which blended droning industrial cacophony and microtonality with quasi-mysticism and advanced mathematics. In 1982 he worked with Z'EV for Branca's Symphony No. 2 in which Z'EV had a solo segment swinging with metal can overhead, and rattling chains and sheets of steel. With Symphony No. 3 (Gloria) (1983), he began to systematically compose for the harmonic series, which he considered to be the structure underlying not only all music but most human endeavors. In this project, Branca was initially influenced by the writings of Dane Rudhyar, Hermann von Helmholtz, and Harry Partch.

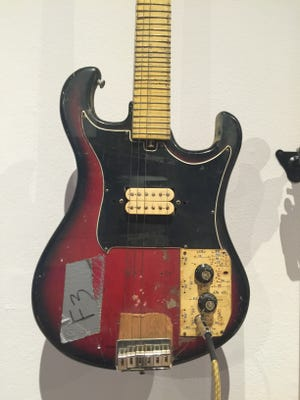
One of the many custom instruments created by Branca

Early members of his group included Thurston Moore and Lee Ranaldo of Sonic Youth, Page Hamilton of Helmet, Phil Kline of The Del-Byzanteens, and several members of Swans including Michael Gira, Dan Braun, and Algis Kizys.

=== Custom-built musical instruments ===
To further develop his compositions based on the harmonic series Branca built several electrically amplified instruments of his own invention, expanding his ensemble beyond the guitar. A few of these instruments were third bridge zithers he called harmonics guitars. He also built instruments with many strings which he referred to as "mallet guitars" because they were percussion instruments played with drumsticks and monotone electric cymbaloms with an additional third bridge on resonating positions. Many of these instruments can be seen in the live performances that appeared on the DVD Glenn Branca - Symphonies 8 & 10 - Live at The Kitchen.

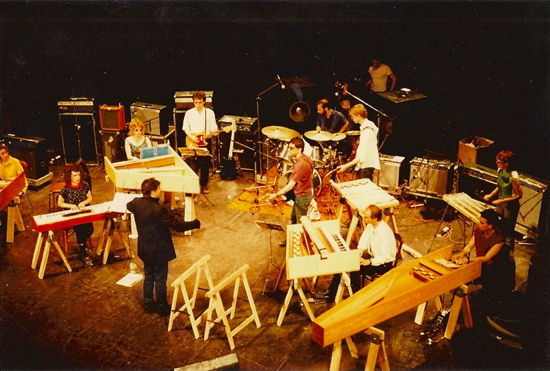
The Glenn Branca Ensemble performing Symphony No. 4 Physics in Europe 1983. Featuring some of the custom made instruments

=== Late work: 1990s to 2018 ===
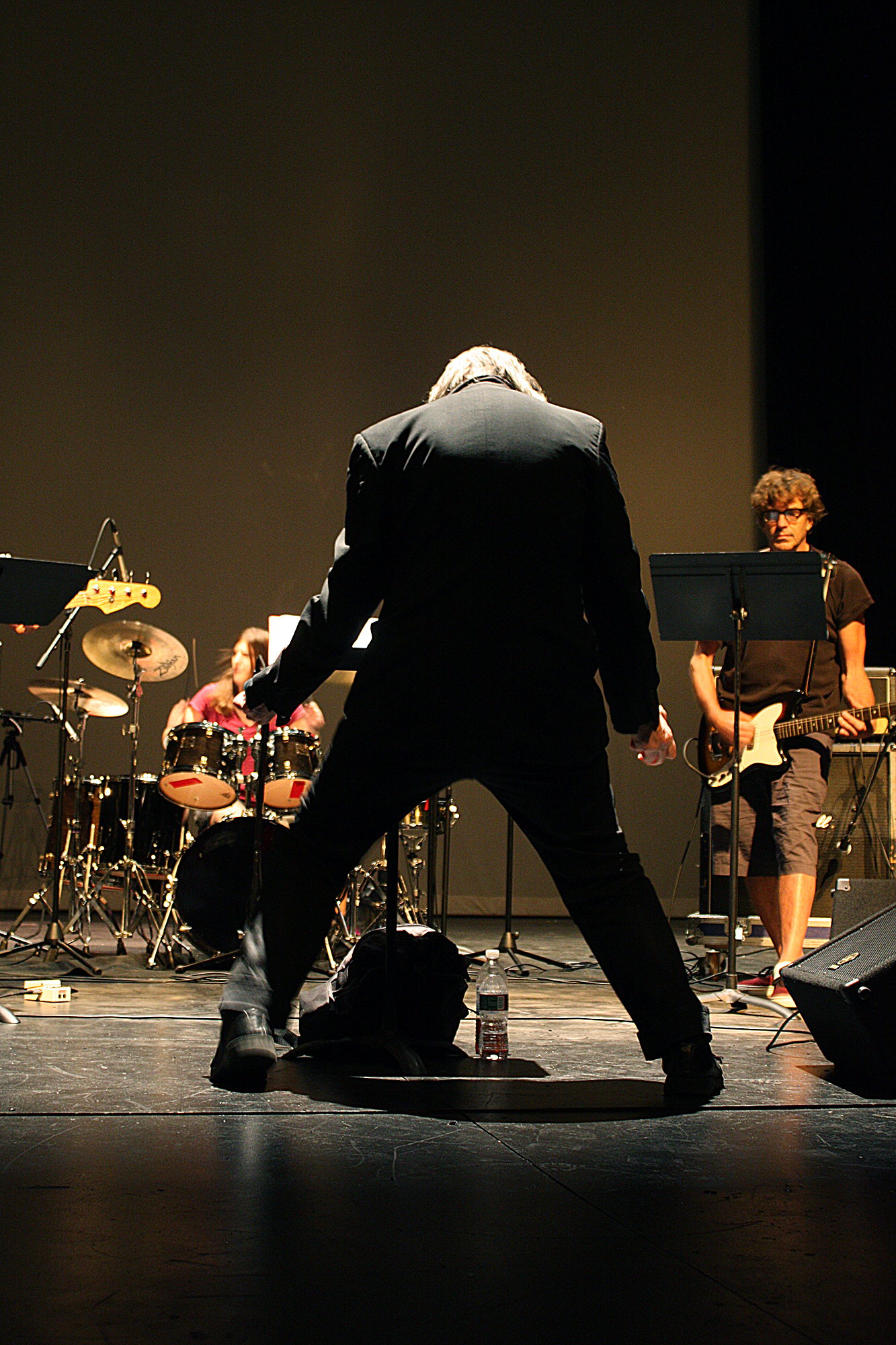
The Glenn Branca Ensemble, 2012 in Washington, D.C.

In the early 1990s, David Baratier attempted to document Branca's teaching style in They Walked in Line. In September 1996, The Glenn Branca Ensemble played at the opening ceremony for the Aarhus Festival in Denmark. The ceremony took place in the Musikhuset Opera House, and in the audience were the Queen of Denmark, the mayor of Aarhus and other dignitaries. After the composer received more than 25 major commissions starting in 1981 until the time of his death in 2018, Branca's music has started to receive academic attention. Some scholars, most prominently Kyle Gann, consider him (and Rhys Chatham) to be a member of the totalist school of post-minimalism.

Beginning with Symphony No. 7, Branca began composing for traditional orchestra, although he never abandoned the electric guitar. Branca also played duets for excessively amplified guitars with his wife, Reg Bloor, and conducted his 13th symphony for 100 electric guitars at the base of the World Trade Center in New York City on June 13, 2001, less than three months before the center's destruction in the September 11 attacks. Since that time his 100 guitar piece has been performed in cities all over the U.S. and Europe. In 2008, he wrote his 14th Symphony, entitled The Harmonic Series, which is performed by a traditional orchestra. The first (and only completed) movement of this symphony, named 2,000,000,000 Light Years From Home premiered in St. Louis performed by the St. Louis Symphony Orchestra conducted by David Robertson on November 13, 2008. This was the 12th major orchestra to perform Branca's orchestral work since 1986.

In 2008, he was awarded a grant from the Foundation for Contemporary Arts Grants to Artists Award as well as a CAPS grant in 1983, an award from the National Endowment for the Arts in 1988 and a NYSCA grant in 1998, all for music composition. In 2010, BBN Music re-released Branca's 1981 album The Ascension as a special edition on 180 gram vinyl and Branca wrote a piece The Ascension: The Sequel, which was released in the same year on the label Systems Neutralizers. This follow up piece led to new interest in his work and notable performances at Primavera Sound Festival 2011 and Villette Sonique 2011.

In October 2014, Branca premiered Ascension Three, touring it with Glenn Branca Ensemble in Europe. In February 2015, Branca's second 100 electric guitars piece, Symphony No. 16 (Orgasm), was premiered at Cité de la Musique in Paris. The Light (for David) for four guitars, bass and drums, premiered in October 2016 at the Roulette in Brooklyn.

=== Death ===
On May 14, 2018, Reg Bloor's official Facebook page revealed in a post that Branca had died from throat cancer the night before. He was 69.

== Legacy ==
Branca was featured in 2023 at the Centre Pompidou in a Nicolas Ballet curated exhibition entitled Who You Staring At: Culture visuelle de la scène no wave des années 1970 et 1980 (Visual culture of the no wave scene in the 1970s and 1980s).

== Discography ==
=== Albums ===
- The Ascension (1981)
- Who You Staring At? (split with John Giorno (1982)
- Symphony No. 6 (Devil Choirs at the Gates of Heaven) (1989)
- The World Upside Down (1992)
- Symphonies Nos. 8 & 10 (The Mysteries) (1994)
- Symphony No. 5 (Describing Planes of an Expanding Hypersphere) (1995)
- Symphony No. 9 (L'eve Future) (1995)
- Indeterminate Activity of Resultant Masses (2006)
- The Ascension: The Sequel (2010)
- Symphony No. 13 (Hallucination City) For 100 guitars (2016)

=== Singles ===
- "Acoustic Phenomena" (1983)
- "Symphony No. 9 (L'eve Future)" (1995)

=== EPs ===
- Lesson No. 1 (1980)
- Edmond (1986)
- Empty Blue (with Tony Oursler) (2000)

=== Live albums ===
- Symphony No. 3 (Gloria) (1983)
- Symphony No. 1 (Tonal Plexus) (1983)
- Symphony No. 2 (The Peak of the Sacred) (featuring Z'EV) (1992)
- Symphony No. 7 (Graz) (2010)
- Ensemble - Live at Primavera Sound 2011 (2011)
- The Third Ascension (2019)
- Symphony No. 4 (Physcis) (2026)

=== Compilations ===
- Songs '77–'79 (1995)
- Selections From the Symphonies (For Electric Guitars) (1997)

== Music videos ==
- Glenn Branca - Symphonies 8 & 10 - Live at The Kitchen (DVD)

== See also ==
- Mudd Club
- Minimalism (music)
- Tier 3
- Just Another Asshole
- New wave music
- No Wave Cinema
- No wave
- Noise Fest
- Experimental musical instrument
- Noise music
- List of noise musicians
- Post-punk
