= Tellus Audio Cassette Magazine =

Avant-garde music magazine

Tellus cassette tapes

Logo

Tellus Audio Cassette Magazine was an audio cassette magazine publication on cassette active from 1983 to 1993. Originally intended as a subscription bimonthly, it was launched on the Lower East Side of Manhattan to create an avant-garde media focus on no wave, downtown music, performance art, experimental electronica, noise music, and audio art. Over the span of its activity, Tellus broadened its curatorial focus to include such diverse subjects as the contemporary music of China, Just Intonation, Fluxus, Tango, and Paul Bowles.

== History ==
Tellus publishers and executive editors – visual artist and noise music composer, Joseph Nechvatal; curator and executive director of the Shaker Museum and Library, Claudia Gould; and new music composer and director emerita of Harvestworks, Carol Parkinson – conceived of the compact cassette medium as a no wave Fluxus-inspired media art form in itself.

Nechvatal and Parkinson had met in the mid-1970s and performed in a performance art / minimal art dance trio with Cid Collins influenced by the post-Merce Cunningham postmodern dance/choreography of Deborah Hay (with whom they studied in 1977) and Carolee Schneemann (with whom they toured Europe in 1978). In 1979, Nechvatal, Collins and Parkinson had organized the five night Public Arts International/Free Speech performance art festival in May at 75 Warren Street in Manhattan and Nechvatal and Parkinson continued to see each other in the art music milieu of the downtown minimal music scene, as they worked for the Dia Art Foundation as archivist (Nechvatal) and assistant (Parkinson) to La Monte Young.

Nechvatal, who originated the concept of the project, chose the name Tellus from Tellus Mater, the Roman earth goddess of fecundity. In 2007, French music blogger Continuo and Stephen McLaughlin created an online mp3 archive of all of the Tellus tracks and accessibly archived them at Ubuweb.

== Tellus Audio Cassette Magazine Anthology series ==
In 2026, the record label Earth Libraries began producing an anthology series of double vinyl LP records, created in collaboration with the founders of Tellus Audio Cassette Magazine. Tracks on the Anthology records are remastered from the original cassette masters and packaged with archival photos. Tellus Audio Cassette Magazine Anthology Volume I contains liner notes written by Thurston Moore of Sonic Youth.

== Historical recognition ==
- Ego Masher (1983) 07:05 by Joseph Nechvatal - from Tellus #1 - has been anthologized on the CD An Anthology of Noise & Electronic Music #6.
- In 2007, Tellus Audio Cassette Magazine was mentioned as an inspiration to the opening of the Sound Art Museum in Rome, Italy.
- An exhibition was held at Printed Matter, Inc. in New York City devoted to current American cassette culture entitled Leaderless: Underground Cassette Culture Now (May 12–26, 2007) that referred to the influence of Tellus Audio Cassette Magazine.
- In 2011, selections from early Tellus Audio Cassette Magazine recordings were included in MoMA's exhibition Looking at Music 3.0.
- On August 17, 2011, Kill Ugly Radio broadcast Episode 08.16.11: Tellus Audio Cassette Magazine that is archived online.
- In September 2011, Tellus Audio Cassette Magazine was the sole subject of a Kontra Bass (BSSX) internet radio broadcast originating in Serbia.
- In February 2011, issues of Artforum (with images of covers) and ARTnews covered Tellus Audio Cassette Magazine.
- In 2013, Devon Maloney, at Wired Magazine, reports that Master Cactus: The Art Zine Available Only on Cassette, was directly inspired by Tellus Audio Cassette Magazine.
- In 2016, Multi-genre compiler and NTS radio host Jaro Sounder created and streamed Tellus Audio Cassette Magazine Selections Vol. 1 (1983–1993) on Bandcamp.
- In 2017, curator Tom Leeser created an audio homage to Tellus Audio Cassette Magazine titled Imagining Tellus # 28: Heard in LA, stating that "The Tellus Project, produced and curated by Carol Parkinson, Joseph Nechvatal and Claudia Gould, is now considered a historic and significant archive of experimental sound, noise, performance and spoken word artists from the 1980s."
- In 2018, Adrian Rew of Blank Forms, a curatorial platform focused on the presentation and preservation of experimental performance, spoke with Tellus Audio Cassette Magazine co-founder Carol Parkinson on Montez Press Radio to discuss the history of the pioneering sound art label and play selections from its tape-o-graphy.
- In 2019, Ego Masher (1983) by Joseph Nechvatal from Tellus #1 was included on the audio anthology Manic Antenna 34: Move On Up!
- In 2020, Kenneth Goldsmith writes in his book Duchamp Is My Lawyer: The Polemics, Pragmatics, and Poetics of Ubuweb that "Perhaps no collection of audio inspired UbuWeb more than the Tellus cassettes…."
- On June 24, 2021, a two-hour Tellus Audio Cassette Magazine Special aired on Dublab with Tellus co-founders Carol Parkinson and Joseph Nechvatal joining Dublab host Frosty for a survey of the Tellus mission and history and a selection of Tellus archival recordings.
- October 30, 2021, The Quietus writer Robert Barry published Tape Hiss: Joseph Nechvatal & The History Of Tellus Audio Cassette Magazine.
- November 6, 2021, The story of Tellus Audio Cassette Magazine was featured on composer, collector and archivist of rare music, Jean Jacques Palix's music blog beyond the coda.
- June 17, 2022, music historian Paul Paulun published at Sounds Central an audio program of his selected Tellus Audio Cassette Magazine tracks called Tellus: New York City’s Art Scene on Tape (1983–1993).
- November 13 to December 1, 2024, Tellus Audio Cassette Magazine was featured in the CYFEST 16 International Media Art Festival in Yerevan, Armenia.
- February 22, 2024, In Sheep's Clothing Hifi web-published an homage to Tellus titled Tellus Audio Cassette Magazine: Portable NYC Art from the Walkman Era.
- November 30, 2024, Neri Rosa of Mutante Radio in Centro Americana, São Paulo, broadcast a No Wave radio special on Tellus Audio Cassette Magazine Part 1.
- January 1, 2025 Sarah Teraha presented a Tellus Audio Cassette Magazine radio program on NTS Radio Paris.
- January 10, 2025, Neri Rosa of Mutante Radio in Centro Americana, São Paulo, broadcast a No Wave radio special on Tellus Audio Cassette Magazine Part 2.
- Fall 2026, Tellus Audio Cassette Magazine #13 Power Electronics (1986) was featured by art historian Nicolas Ballet in the French book Maelström Magnétique: La Cassette dans tous ses états edited by Sixtine Audebert and Samuel Guillerand for RQM éditions, Paris, pp. 275-277.

== Publications ==
Issue	Title	Format	Year	Curators	Cover art	Featuring
#1	Tellus #1	Cassette	1983	Claudia Gould, Joseph Nechvatal, Carol Parkinson	Walter Robinson	Jody Harris, Jerry Lindahl, Sonic Youth, Brenda Hutchinson, Live Skull, Tom Lopez/ZBS Productions, Rat At Rat R, Bradley Eros, Bruce Tovsky, Gretchen Langheld, Mitch Corber, Barbara Ess (with Barbara Barg), Joseph Nechvatal, Verge Piersoi, Tron Von Hollywood with Raina Jane Sherry, David Linton, Rhys Chatham.
#2	Tellus #2	Cassette	1984	Claudia Gould, Joseph Nechvatal, Carol Parkinson	Jane Dickson	Kiki Smith, John Fekner, Vernita Nemec, The Scene Is Now, Tony Papa, Cardboard Air Band, Peter Nechvatal, Charlie Morrow, Alex Noyes, Ikkoh Mine, David Rosenbloom, Carol Parkinson, David Garland, John Fekner, Mitch Corber, Jamie Daglish and George Elliot, Dr. Telecom (Willoughby Sharp, Susan Britton, Robert Stewart, Virge Piersol), Charlie Noyes, Holly Huges+Sally A. White+Maureen Angelos+Jill Kirschen+Janee Pipik, Ron Kuivila.
#3	Tellus #3	Cassette	1984	Claudia Gould, Joseph Nechvatal, Carol Parkinson	Erik Kualszik	Kirby Malone, Jim Farmer, Christopher Knowles, Disband, Chain Gang, Gregory Whitehead, Daniel Shklalr, Bruce Tovaky, Wolfgang Staehle and Steve Pollack, Isaac Jackson, Colab's Cardboard Air Band, John Shirley and Sync 66, Tim Schellenbeum, The Tlnklers, Boom, Brian Reinbolt, Wharton Tiers.
#4	Piano	Cassette	1984	Claudia Gould, Joseph Nechvatal, Carol Parkinson	Joseph Nechvatal	Julius Eastman, David Weinstein, Michael Byron, Paul Dresher, Carol Parkinson, Ellen Fullman, John Morton.
#5	Double Audio Visual Issue	Cassette	1984	Claudia Gould, Joseph Nechvatal, Carol Parkinson	Joseph Nechvatal	Louise Lawler, Paul McMahon and Nancy Chun, Julie Harrison, Richard Prince, Julie Wachtel, Perry Hoberman, Ericka Beckman, David Wojnarowicz and Doug Bressler, Paul McMahon and Nancy Chun, Raimund Kummer, Barbara Barg and Barbara Ess, Kathryn High, Bite Like A Kitty, Anne Turyn, Michael Smith, Rhys Chatham.
#6	Double Audio Visual Issue	Cassette	1984	Claudia Gould, Joseph Nechvatal, Carol Parkinson	Joseph Nechvatal	Louise Lawler, Paul McMahon and Nancy Chun, Julie Harrison, Richard Prince, Julie Wachtel, Perry Hoberman, Ericka Beckman, David Wojnarowicz and Doug Bressler, Paul McMahon and Nancy Chun, Raimund Kummer, Barbara Barg and Barbara Ess, Kathryn High, Bite Like A Kitty, Anne Turyn, Michael Smith, Rhys Chatham.
#7	The Word I	Cassette	1984	Gregory Whitehead	Peter Nagy	Linda Fisher, Michael Peppe, Wiska Radiewicz, John Miller, Terry Wilson, Lynne Tillman, Victor Poison-Tete, Jean-Paul Curtay, Claire Picher, Patrick McGrath, Molly Elder, Michael Gira, Gregory Whitehead, Nicolas Nowack, Cid Collins Walker, Richard Kostelanetz, Paul Bob Town, Nameless Stone Productions.
#8	USA/Germany	Cassette	1985	Carlo McCormick	Debbie Davis	Konk, Joshua Fried, Details At Eleven, Cargo Cult, Destructo, His Masters Voice, Rat at rat r, Yellow Grave, Live Skull, Elliott Sharp, Fast Forward, Christian Marclay, Club of Rome (aka Asmus Tietchens), Saurekeller, Galerie Global, Nicolas Nowack.
#9	Music with Memory	Cassette	1985	John Driscoll	Carol Parkinson	Nicolas Collins, John Driscoll, Brenda Hutchinson, Ron Kuivila, Paul DeMarinis.
#10	All Guitars!	Cassette	1985	Tom Paine	Jane Bauman	Lee Ranaldo, Arto Lindsay and Toni Nogueira, Janice Sloane, Butthole Surfers, New Detroit Inc., Bob Mould, Bond Bergland, Joseph Nechvatal, Elliott Sharp, David Linton, Jules Baptiste, Tim Schellenbaum, Bump, Rudolph Grey, Hahn Rowe, John Myres, Lydia Lunch and Lucy Hamilton, Sue Hanel, Blixa Bargeld, Andrew Nahem, Sandra Seymour, Run Nigger Run aka Steve Albini and Nathan Kaatrud, Thurston Moore, Mark C. and Marnie Greenholz, Glenn Branca, James Vidos, Angela Babin and Joe Dizney, Frankenjerry.
#11	The Sound of Radio	Cassette	1985	Karen Frillmann, Karen Pearlman	Steven Frailey	Jay Allison, Adam Cornford and Daniel Crafts, Susan Stone, The New York IPS, M’lou Zahner Ollswang, Ginna Allison, Marjorie van Halteren, Lou Giansante, Karen McPherson, Barrett Golding, Rick Harris, Janice Bell and Portia Franklin, Melanie Berzon, Edward Haber, Steve Jones, Helen Thorington, Ginger Miles, Karen Frillmann.
#12	Dance	Cassette	1986	Gretchen Langheld, Bruce Tovsky	Barbara Ess	Bill Obrecht, A. Leroy, R. McQuire, Carol Parkinson, Linda Fisher, Lenny Pickett, Anita Feldman+Michael Kowalski, J.A. Deane, Gretchen Langheld, Bruce Tovsky, Brooks Williams, Jim Farmer, Hearn Gadbois, Liquid Liquid, Al Diaz, David Linton.
#13	Power Electronics	Cassette	1986	Joseph Nechvatal	Joseph Nechvatal	Maybe Mental, Merzbow, Amor Fati, If, Bwana, Rhys Chatham, Psyclones, Blackhouse, Joseph Nechvatal, Master/Slave Relationship, Maybe Mental, Architects Office, Controlled Bleeding, Mojo (aka Jim Smith), Coup de Grâce, Le Syndicat, Mitch Corber, F/i.
#14	Just Intonation	Cassette	1986	Just Intonation Network	James Nares	Harry Partch, Ralph David Hill, Carola B. Anderson, David Hykes, Lou Harrison, Jon Catler, David Canright, David B. Doty, John Bischoff,+Jim Horton+Tim Perkis, Ben Johnston, Erling Wold, Susan Norris, James Tenney, Larry Polansky, Alexis Alrich, Jody Diamond.
#15	The Improvisors	Cassette	1986	Claudia Gould, Joseph Nechvatal, Carol Parkinson	Scott Richter	Live ‘improvisions’ by Chris Cochrane, Anthony Coleman, Carol Emanuel, Tom Cora, Bill Frisell, Bobby Previte, Lindsay Cooper, Fred Frith, Irene Schweizer, Christian Marclay, Bill Horvitz, David Weinstein, Denman Maroney, Samm Bennett, Jim Staley, Ikue Mori, John Zorn.
#16	Tango	Cassette	1986	Gerald Lindhal	Russell Buckingham	Carlos Gardel, David Garland, Chris DeBlasio, Keeler, Brenda Hutchinson and Gerald Lindhal, Alan Tomlinson, Elodie Lauten, Jo Basile and Orchestra, Robert Scheff, Molly Elder, Matthew Nash, Jo Basile and Orchestra, Christopher Berg, Fast Forward, Mader.
#17	Video Art Music	Cassette	1987	Peer Bode	Peer Bode	Woody Vasulka, Peter Chamberlain, Richard Kostelanetz, Shelley Hirsch, Joe D’Agostino, Julie Harrison, Kjell Bjorgeengen, Sorrel Hays, Eric Ross, Megan Roberts, Jean-Paul Curtay.
#18	Experimental Theater	Cassette	1988	Claudia Gould, Carol Parkinson	Mike Kelley	Spalding Gray, Ann Magnuson with Vulcan Death Grip, Mike Kelley with Sonic Youth, Jerri Allyn, Ann Magnuson and Lydia Lunch.
#19	New Music China	Cassette	1988	R.I.P. Hayman	Zhang Wei, Huang Pao Lian (calligraphy)	Ji Gong, Wang Li, Zhang Xing, Tiao Ba Tiao Ba, Zui Jiu, Hao Yuchi, Electronic Dirge, Xian Percussion Ensemble, Miao Love Chant, Liu Dehal, Gong Yi, Fred Houn, Chen Yi, Ge Gan-ru, Zhou Long, Wu Wen Guang, Tan Dun, R.I.P. Hayman, Jing Jing Luo.
#20	Media Myth	Cassette	1988	Joseph Nechvatal	Steven Parrino	Randy Greif, Pierre Perret, The Psychic Workshop, Social Interiors, If, Bwana, Crawling With Tarts, Violence and The Sacred, Art Interface, Minóy, Nicolas Collins, Silent But Deadly, JPM Studios, Joseph Nechvatal, A Place To Pray, Maurice Methot, Michael Chocholak, Dance.
#21	Audio By Visual Artists	Cassette	1988	Claudia Gould, Joseph Nechvatal, Carol Parkinson	Cindy Sherman	Joseph Beuys, Maurice Lemaître, Filippo Tommaso Marinetti, Raoul Hausmann, Antonio Russolo, Marcel Duchamp, Kurt Schwitters, Lawrence Weiner, George Brecht, Patrick Ireland, Richard Huelsenbeck, Arrigo Lora-Totino and Fogliati, Jean Dubuffet, Mimmo Rotella, Joan Jonas, Christian Boltanski, Ian Murray, Terry Fox, Jonathan Borofsky, Magdalena Abakanowicz, Richard Prince with Robert Gober, Martin Kippenberger, Jack Goldstein, John Armleder, Terry Allen, Gretchen Bender, Y Pants, Ed Tomney, Susan Hiller.
#22	False Phonemes	Cassette	1988	Ellen Zweig	Matt Mullican	Remko Scha, Larry Wendt, Brian Reinbolt, Mark Rudolph, Alice Shields, Paul DeMarinis, Paul Lansky, Jon English/Jim Pomeroy, Ron Kuivila, John Cage.
#23	The Voices of Paul Bowles	Cassette	1989	Stephen Frailey	Antonin Kratochvil	Audioportrait incl. Paul Bowles early compositions Music for a Farce, Interlude and Prelude # 2, and Moroccan field recordings
#24	FluxTellus	Cassette	1990	Barbara Moore	Peter Moore	16-page accordion fold-out booklet with Barbara Moore's essay The Sound Of Music. Early sound work by George Brecht, Philip Corner, Dick Higgins, Joe Jones, Alison Knowles, Takehisa Kosugi, George Maciunas, Jackson Mac Low, Larry Miller, Tomas Schmit, Robert Watts and Emmett Williams. The cassette case includes a sound art work by Takako Saito.
#25	Siteless Sounds	Compact disc	1991	Claudia Gould, Joseph Nechvatal, Carol Parkinson	David Wojnarowicz	Political and personal views as expressed through new audiotext works by David Wojnarowicz and Ben Neill, Shelley Hirsch, David Moss, Constance DeJong, Brenda Hutchinson, Gregory Whitehead and a collaboration with Jacki Apple, Linda Albertano, Keith Antar Mason and Akailah Nayo Oliver.
#26	Jewel Box	Cassette, compact disc	1992	Brian Karl	Kiki Smith	Anne LeBaron, Laetitia Sonami, Sussan Deyhim, Bun-Ching Lam, Catherine Jauniaux and Ikue Mori, Sapphire, Mary Ellen Childs, Michelle Kinney.
#27	Mini-mall	Compact disc	1993	Brian Karl	Vito Acconci	Brenda Hutchinson, Jin Hi Kiim, and Pauline Oliveros with Fanny Green.

Tellus Tools
Double-LP (TE-LP01), 2001.
Curated by Taketo Shimada. Cover art by Christian Marclay.
Including selections from previous issues: Isaac Jackson, Alan Tomlinson, Joe Jones, Christian Marclay, Ken Montgomery, Catherine Jauniaux, Ikue Mori, David Linton, Gregory Whitehead, The League Of Automatic Music Composers, Maurice Lemaire, Jerry Lindahl, Tim Schellenbaum and Jack Goldstein.
