= Michael Takeo Magruder =

American/British new media and digital artist

- Born: 1974 (age 51–52)
- Education: University of Virginia
- Known for: New Media Art, Digital Art, Internet Art, Virtual World Art, Installation Art, Aesthetic Journalism
- Notable work: [ FALLUJAH . IRAQ . 31/03/2004 ]; (in)Remembrance [11-M]; A New Jerusalem
- Awards: Lumen Prize 2015 Immersive Environments Award; British Library Labs 2017 Artistic Award
- Website: www.takeo.org

Michael Takeo Magruder (born 1974) is an American-British new media and digital artist who uses digital technologies to create work that connects with real-time data, virtual worlds and networked mobile devices.

== Education ==
Magruder studied at the University of Virginia in the United States during 1992–96, gaining a BS degree in Biological Sciences.

== Work ==
Magruder's work has appeared at the Courtauld Institute of Art in London, UK; Centre Georges Pompidou, in Paris, France; and what is now called the Tokyo Photographic Art Museum in Japan. Magruder's work is included in the Rose Goldsen Archive of New Media Art at Cornell University. In 2010 Magruder represented the UK at Manifesta 8: the European Biennial of Contemporary Art. During 2013–14, he was a Leverhulme Trust artist in residence, which culminated in his solo exhibition, 'De/coding the Apocalypse'. Magruder won the Lumen Prize Immersive Environment Award in 2015 for A New Jerusalem, which was a work in 'De/coding the Apocalypse'. Magruder was the first runner up in the British Library Labs Competition 2016 and the British Library Labs 2017 Artistic Award Winner. Magruder's solo exhibition currently at the British Library, Imaginary Cities, employs the digital map archives at the British Library.

== Selected works ==
=== <event> ===
<event> was commissioned by Turbulence.org in 2004. The work has been described by Jo-Anne Green, as engaging "with media saturation and its subsequent devaluation of information; copyright — who actually owns the information, the event that triggered it, the history it becomes?; is it the ‘truth’?" The source material of the work was "headline news articles parsed from http://news.bbc.co.uk/ between 29.12.2003 and 01.02.2004 from which samples of audio, image, text, and video information were extracted.".

=== [FALLUJAH . IRAQ . 31/03/2004] ===
The work concerns events that occurred when four American mercenaries were ambushed and shot or beaten to death by Iraqi insurgents. The source material employed in creating the work included censored AP source footage from www.thememoryhole.org and public domain news articles from www.bbc.co.uk. The work was exhibited at FILE: Internacional Electronic Language Festival and in Turbulence Artist Studios. It was selected by Gustav Metzger for EASTinternational 05.

=== Encoded Presence [auto-portrait of E. Puente] ===
Encoded Presence [auto-portrait of E. Puente] was one of twenty finalists for the inaugural Noka/Darklight Pocket Movies Challenge in 2005. The work concerned the "re-purposing of the mobile phone from a mundane communication device to a cinematic instrument". Encoded Presence [auto-portrait of E. Puente] also appeared in Pocket Films: Festival international de films réalisés avec téléphone mobile at the Centre Pompidou in 2007.

=== re_collection ===
Magruder's work, re_collection was included in the December 2005 exhibition at Lumen Eclipse, which is a public media arts gallery located in Harvard Square, Cambridge, Massachusetts. On Magruder's website, he describes how the work consists of a person "recorded without direction utilising only a SVP c500 smartphone as a cinematic device. From the resulting material a single 14 second audio/video stream was extracted and used (with only minor editing/manipulation) as the exclusive source material for the artwork." The exhibition in which the work appeared was reviewed by Cate McQuaid for the Boston Globe. In her comments about re_collection she said that Magruder, "cleverly utilizes the hallmarks of his medium to disorient: He pixelates the image, a grassy landscape, into a bright, clunky grid."

=== {Transcription} ===
{Transcription} was first exhibited at the Courtauld Institute of Art. Magruder's website describes the work as "a real-time media installation, specifically created for the [Courtauld] Institute’s back six-level staircase. Consisting of dynamic audio/visual structures intermixed with static wall- drawn elements, the work reflects upon society's data-driven and information-saturated existence through the examination of international news communications". Prof. Gegory Sporton has described the subject of the work in terms of "[t]echnology's role as a gauze through which we view the world".

=== PRISM ===
Magruder was commissioned by Headlong, a UK-based theatre company, to create PRISM in 2014. The work was a new media installation that reflected on a production by Headlong of a new adaptation created by Robert Icke and Duncan Macmillan of the novel, Nineteen Eighty-Four, by George Orwell. PRISM is described as reflecting on Edward Snowden and the information about "a portfolio of clandestine mass surveillance programs on a scale reminiscent of George Orwell’s dystopian society of 1984" that he brought to public attention. Headlong also commissioned a second work: The Nether Realm, which was a living virtual world inspired by the play, The Nether, by Jennifer Haley.

=== A New Jerusalem ===
A New Jerusalem was first exhibited as part of the De/coding the Apocalypse exhibition at Somerset House in London, England. The work was created by Michael Takeo Magruder with Prof. Edward Adams and Drew Baker and won the Lumen Prize Immersive Environment Award in 2015. The piece is based upon the narrative of the Book of Revelation. In 2018, the work was included in the exhibition And I Will Take You to Paradise at Art Museum KUBE, Norway.

=== Lamentation for the Forsaken ===
Lamentation for the Forsaken was commissioned for the exhibition, Stations of the Cross, which took place in Lent, 2016. The work is described as a "new media installation that juxtaposes Christ’s suffering and journey to the cross with the anguish and plight of refugees fleeing the Syrian Civil War". The work was situated in St Stephen Walbrook as one of the fourteen locations across London in which the Stations of the Cross exhibition took place to "tell the story of the Passion in a new way, for people of different faiths". Revd. Jonathan Evens, Priest-in-charge at St Stephen Walbrook, has commented on the synergy of the church with the work in relation to matters such as lamentation and the refugee crisis. Magruder is reported as having stated that "his practice is not in any way a religious endeavor — even with artworks like Lamentation for the Forsaken that explicitly reference a Christian narrative". The exhibition transferred to Washington, D.C. and New York City in the United States. In the exhibition in New York City, Lamentation for the Forsaken was located at "Station Six (Veronica Wipes the Face of Jesus) at New York's Church of the Heavenly Rest on 5th Ave and 90th street". The work was subsequently situated in the Chapel of the Resurrection Christ Church Cranbrook, in Bloomfield Hills, Michigan, USA. Prof. Aaron Rosen has described the work as "a lamentation not only for the forsaken Christ, but others who have felt his acute pain of abandonment".

== Selected exhibitions ==
=== (in)Remembrance [11-M] ===
In 2010, Magruder was commissioned to create (in)Remembrance [11-M] for Manifesta 8: the European Biennial of Contemporary Art. The project was a series of interrelated works that engaged with the train bombings in Madrid, Spain in 2004. (in)Remembrance [11-M] was installed at Museo Regional de Arte Moderno (MURAM) in Cartagena, Spain. In his book, Aesthetic Journalism: How to Inform Without Informing, Alfredo Cramerotti has described how Magruder "undertakes journalistic investigations by sourcing third-person material to build a highly individualized narrative of the facts reported." Magruder has described (in)Remembrance [11-M] as a project more than an exhibition in an art gallery.

=== Living Data ===
'Living Data' was a solo touring exhibition that included works generated from the "vast and ever-changing sea of collective data that underpins our everyday existence," and engaged with the way in which real-time digital technology is generated by and then has an impact on the material world. The exhibition included the following works of art: Data_cosm; Data_plex (babel); Data_plex (economy); Data_Sea; Data Flower (prototype I); Data Storm (prototype I); and Data.Record [BBC_2010.08.17@16:26GMT].

=== De/coding the Apocalypse ===
'De/coding the Apocalypse' was a solo exhibition that concerned the Book of Revelation. The Revd. Jonathan Evens has commented that, "[t]he word 'apocalypse' originally indicated an 'unveiling,' and the exhibition investigates our enduring fascination with this seminal biblical text, updating and investigating its aspects". 'De/coding the Apocalypse' was the culmination of an interdisciplinary collaboration supported by the Cultural Institute at King's College London, which combined Magruder's art practice with academic research in the Department of Theology & Religious Studies at King's College London in partnership with the contemporary art center, MOSTYN. Magruder collaborated with Professor Ben Quash (Theology, King's College London) and Alfredo Cramerotti, Director of MOSTYN. The exhibition included digital media installations, which used a variety of digital technologies, including mobile devices and computers as well as tangible art composed of physical materials. Michael Takeo Magruder was the Centre for the Critical Study of Apocalyptic and Millenarian Movements ('CenSAMM') Artist in Residence for the conference, 'Apocalypse in Art: The Creative Unveiling'. During his residency, he installed "De/coding the Apocalypse" at the Panacea Museum in Bedford, England.
