= Gregory Whitehead =

American radio artist, writer and media philosopher

- Years active: 1980 - present
- Notable work: Pressures of the Unspeakable, Shake, Rattle, Roll, The Loneliest Road, On The Shore Dimly Seen
- Awards: Prix Italia, Frix Futura, Sony Gold Academy
- Website: https://gregorywhitehead.net

Gregory Whitehead is an American radiomaker, audio artist, text-sound poet, playwright and media philosopher based in Lenox, Massachusetts.He is an internationally acclaimed artist who has created radio artworks, plays, and experimental features for the BBC, Radio France, Deutschland Radio, Australia's ABC, and NPR and other broadcasters. Whitehead has received a Prix Italia, a Prix Futura, and a Sony Gold Academy Awards, and his work has been the subject of academic research and critical writing on radio art, sound, and media.

== Career ==
Gregory Whitehead began experimenting with audiotape while an undergraduate at Haverford College, using two cassette recorders to improvise, record, and mix voices with instruments, including his own saxophones. He later earned an MA in Media Studies at the New School for Social Research, which at that time placed a strong emphasis on creative radio. Whitehead's thesis examined Walter Ong’s ideas on electronic orality and phenomenological presence as expressed through the voice. During this period, he also developed an interest in the films and philosophies of Alexander Kluge and Chris Marker, focusing on the relationship between documentary evidence and imaginative counterpoint. At the same time, he created experimental voice performances and text-sound poetry in dialogue with Charles Amirkhanian and other artists.

In 1987, Whitehead collaborated with Helen Thorington and Regine Beyer on the creation of a three-day Festival for a New Radio broadcast on WKCR FM in New York City. The three also contributed to the founding of New American Radio, a nationally distributed series presenting radio works across a wide range of genres.

During the 1990s, Whitehead initiated two research projects: the Laboratory for Innovation and Acoustic Research (LIAR) and the International Institute for Screamscape Studies, which included a large scream archive and the Prix Italia–awarded radio broadcast, Pressures of the Unspeakable. He also worked on semi-improvisatory collaborations with Christof Migone (The Thing About Bugs) and Richard Busch (Nothing But Fog). In the same period he also contributed to All Things Considered and This American Life. At the turn of the 2000s, Whitehead serves as an advisor for WGXC, a local station with a mission to explore experimental radio. Beginning in 1998, he produced programs for BBC Radio 4, exploring imaginative and experimental audio forms. Up to 2012, he continued to produce radio plays and documentaries for BBC Radio 3 and 4.

Gregory Whitehead continues to produce a diverse body of radio art and experimental text-sound works, working independently for a variety of stations and initiatives internationally. His media repertoire spans both analog and digital formats, including cassette tapes, CDs, radio broadcasts, and music festivals. Whitehead's work has been included in exhibitions at the Wellcome Collection, the Whitney Museum, Documenta, Mass MOCA, and other institutions. His radio works have also been featured at conferences and festivals, including Radiophrenia, Third Coast International Audio Festival, Radio Revolten. He maintains an ongoing collaboration with Wave Farm, where he frequently appears on air in interviews and discussions and serves as a mentor in their artist residency program.

=== Film and theater ===
In the mid-1980s, Whitehead collaborated with choreographer Karen Bamonte and percussionist Toshi Makihara on the development of Text/Flesh performances, in which texts, rhythms, and bodies intersected, producing narratives such as The Confusion of Tongues and The Assassination. He later worked with Zaven Paré, Mark Sussman, and Allen S. Weiss on Theater of the Ears, based on a text by Valère Novarina, which was performed at La MaMa in New York City. In 2004, he collaborated again with Sussman and Weiss on Danse Macabre, a work featuring the dolls and voice of Michel Nedjar.

Since 2021, Gregory Whitehead has collaborated with Finnish filmmaker Arttu Nieminen, creating experimental short films. In 2021, they created Awareness, an experimental short film combining Whitehead's mantra-like poetry with abstract symmetry and rapid cutting to reflect on the human mind, cultural evolution, and the state of the world. In 2023, they collaborated again on Lift Up Your Voices. In this film, a voice from the perspective of an all-embracing algorithm addresses humanity in its final moments, punctuated by a song drawn from Emily Dickinson’s poem. The work features collage-like montage, hypnotic drone sequences, and the interplay between Whitehead’s text and Nieminen’s visual imagery.

== Radio philosophy ==
=== Woundscape ===
The concept of woundscape in Gregory Whitehead’s work frames wounds not only as physical injuries but as symbolic expressions. It treats wounds as narratives that require interpretation, each carrying a unique voice and significance. Whitehead explores how wounds, both literal and metaphorical, intersect with technological landscapes and societal narratives, emphasizing their role in evoking emotional and philosophical reflections on human experience and memory. The notion extends beyond individual injuries to encompass a broader metaphorical landscape of trauma and its consequences, suggesting a world shaped by wounds whose effects influence perception, identity, and surrounding reality. Wounds represent fragmented, entropic states of consciousness resulting from trauma. In Whitehead’s work, the woundscape functions as a thematic and aesthetic motif, reflecting the intersection of personal trauma with wider social and cultural implications, and forming a metaphorical radio space where wounds and their effects are explored and interpreted.

=== Interference and Entropy ===
Interference and entropy serve as central points of reference in Gregory Whitehead’s radio art, both aesthetically and structurally, as “embodiments of radio’s inherent qualities”. Whitehead emphasized that “to be aware of entropy and interference is crucial for radio art”. His works demonstrate that these aspects are key to his practice, revealing the poetics of interference and entropy as formative strategies. Entropy appears as a formal approach in which the degradation or transformation of sound and language occurs over time, often through analog editing techniques where repeated manipulations alter original recordings to create new sonic textures and meanings. Interference refers to deliberate disruptions within audio compositions, including abrupt cuts, overlapping voices, and juxtaposed sound elements that generate dissonance and complexity. These techniques function as narrative devices that challenge linear storytelling, as exemplified in works such as Blunt Trauma. Through interference and entropy, Whitehead explores the potential of sound and language, investigating themes of fragmentation and reconstruction. Together, these elements form the foundation of his distinctive approach to radio art, shaping experiments with voice, language, and narrative structures.

=== Radio materiality ===
Gregory Whitehead explores the materiality of radio, asking: “what is the material radio, what is the ‘on air’ made of?”. He conceives radio works as multi-layered compositions in which temporal, spatial, and vocal elements coexist within a non-linear field filled with interruptions and interferences. Whitehead highlights the paradoxical relationship between sender and receiver, who are both close through voice and shared silence, and distant through technological mediation. His notion of the radiobody reflects both presence and absence: “frontal physicality and truncated absence”, emphasizing voice, sound, and waves alongside the voice’s lack of physical source. In Through the Wild Dark (2024), he describes radio art as shaped by radio space itself, where the sounds “hardly matter” and significance lies in “the play of relationships that brings listeners out of the dark and into the mix”. The listener, the player, and the media system form a triangular relationship, and interferences—audible effects of signal creation, processing, reception, and fading—constitute the primary material of radio art, reflecting its intrinsic entropy, impermanence, instability, and fragility.

== Works (selection) ==
Active in cassette culture throughout the 1980s, he founded the Minerva cassette label in the mid-1980s. In 1991, RRRecords released a 7” vinyl record titled Vicekopf. Whitehead collaborated with Christof Migone on the 1995 radio play, The Thing About Bugs, for New American Radio. Other radioplays from the 1990s include Pressures of the Unspeakable (1992), Nothing But Fog (1996) and Bewitched, Bothered, Bewildered (1997).

=== Radio ===
==== Early works ====
- Dead Letters (1985, Art Ear)
- Disorder Speech (1985, Minerva Editions)
- Display Wounds (1986, Minerva Editions) commissioned by New American Radio
- Phantom Pain (1987, Minerva Editions)
- Beyond The Pleasure Principle (1987, Minerva Editions)
- Down With The Titanic (1987, Minerva Editions)
- The Pleasure of Ruins (1988, Minerva Editions)
- Writing On Air (1988, Minerva Editions)
- Reptiles And Wildfire 1988 for New Music America held in Miami (1988, Minerva Editions)
- The Respirator And Other Outcasts (1989, Minerva Editions)
- Lovely Ways To Burn (1990, Minerva Editions) commissioned by New American Radio.

==== 1990s ====
- Pressures of the Unspeakable (1991)
- The Pleasure Of Ruins And Other Castaways (1993)
- Degenerates In Dreamland (1991) commissioned by New American Radio
- Shake, Rattle, Roll (1992) commissioned by New American Radio
- The Thing About Bugs (1994) commissioned by New American Radio
- Nothing but Fog (1996) commissioned by Sound Culture 1996

==== BBC (1999-2012) ====
Whitehead has produced plays and documentary essays for BBC Radio:

- Talk to Sleep (1999) quartet of plays:
  - The Bone Trade
  - Hidden Language of Trees
  - Mind, Body & Soul
  - The Bottom of the Mind
- Marination, Perspiration, Respiration (1999) series:
  - Eau de Moi
  - Respiration = Inspiration
  - Marinade a la Tête
- The Marilyn Room (2000)
- American Heavy (2001)
- The Loneliest Road (2003) (won Sony Gold Academy Awards)
- Resurrection Ranch (2003)
- On One Lost Hair (2004)
- No Background Music (2005) (featuring Sigourney Weaver; won Sony Gold Academy Awards)
- The Club (2005)
- Project Jericho (2006)
- Bread On the Waters (2006)
- The Day King Hammer Fell From The Sky (2007)
- A Tale of Two Skulls (2008)
- Bring Me The Head of Philip K. Dick (2009)
- Four Trees Down From Ponte Sisto (2012).

==== 2011 - present ====
- Potato God Scarecrow (2011, Banned Production)
- In the End (2012, SilenceRadio)
- Leave It Or Double It (2012, Transmission Arts)
- India Alpha Mike (2013)
- Bravo Echo (2013)
- Like A Universe, (2014, ABC)
- Crazy Horse One-Eight (2014, Radio Arts Dreamland)
- As We Know (2014)
- On the Shore Dimly Seen (2015), ABC
- Radio Unbroken (2016, Radio Revolten)
- Nothing Like Us (2017, Radiophrenia)
- What Murmurs (2019)
- As All the Heavens (2020)
- May It Come (2024, the Radia Network)
- How Still (2024, the Radia Network and EAPS).
- If Everyone Waits (2025, WGXC and EAPS)
- In the Midst of Deepest Night (2025)
- Spirit Duty Earth (2026)

=== Films ===
- The Bone Trade (1996), John Dryden (director), Gregory Whitehead (writer, actor)
- Awareness (2021), Arttu Nieminen (author), Gregory Whitehead (composer)
- Lift Up Your Voices (2023), Arttu Nieminen (author), Gregory Whitehead (script, sound design)

== Writings (selection) ==
=== Books ===
- Wireless Imagination, 1991, eds. Gregory Whitehead, Douglas Kahn, MIT Press.
- Whitehead, Gregory. Almanach de plaies insensées. Paris: Van Dieren, 2016.

=== Essays ===
- Whitehead, Gregory. “Principia Schizophonica: On Noise, Gas and the Broadcast Disembody.” Art & Text, no. 37 (1990).
- Whitehead, Gregory. “The Forensic Theatre: Memory Plays for the Post-Mortem Condition.” Performing Arts Journal 12, no. 2/3 (1990): 99–109. https://doi.org/10.2307/3245556.
- Whitehead, Gregory. “Radio Art Le Mômo: Gas Leaks, Shock Needles and Death Rattles.” Public 4/5 (1990). Reprinted in V2 Book For The Unstable Media, 1991.
- Whitehead, Gregory. “Holes in the Head: A Theatre for Radio Operations.” Performing Arts Journal 13, no. 3 (1991): 85–91. https://doi.org/10.2307/3245542.
- Whitehead, Gregory. “Pressures of the Unspeakable: A Nervous System for the City of Sydney.” Continuum 6, no. 1 (1992).
- Whitehead, Gregory. “Dead Letters.” Performing Arts Journal 14, no. 2 (1992): 71–86. https://doi.org/10.2307/3245633.
- Whitehead, Gregory. “Radio Play Is No Place: A Conversation between Jérôme Noetinger and Gregory Whitehead.” TDR (1988-) 40, no. 3 (1996): 96–101. https://doi.org/10.2307/1146552.
- Whitehead, Gregory. “Impossible Voices, Unmakeable Beings.” Resonance 5, no. 2 (1997).
- Whitehead, Gregory. “The Bottom of the Mind.” Documenta Magazine, nos. 1–3 (2007).
- Whitehead, Gregory. “Let Us Lay On Splendid Nights.” The Transom Review 9, no. 3 (2009).

=== Chapters ===
- Whitehead Gregory, So, You Wanna Talk About Squid?. In Writing Aloud, Errant Bodies Press, 2001, eds. Brandon LaBelle, Christof Migone.
- Whitehead Gregory, Confessions of a Terminal Schizophoniac. In Sonores, Catalog, 2012, eds. Benjamin Brejon, Manuel Neto.
- Whitehead Gregory, Through the Wild Dark: Loose Notes In Search of a Radio Poetics. In The Oxford Handbook of Radio and Podcasting, 2024, eds. Andrew Bottomley, Michele Hilmes.
- Whitehead, Gregory. “Wings of Eros on Birds of Prey.” In Listen Up!: Radio Art in the USA, transcript Verlag, 2025, eds. Anne Thurmann-Jajes and Regine Beyer.

== Awards and honors ==
- 1992 Pressures of the Unspeakable received a Prix Italia award.
- 1993 Shake, Rattle, Roll received the BBC Newcomer Award at the Prix Futura competition in Berlin.
- 1995 The Thing About Bugs, special commendation, Prix Futura
- 2004 The Loneliest Road, Sony Gold Radio Academy Award
- 2006 No Background Music, Sony Gold Radio Academy Award
- 2015 On the Shore Dimly Seen, short-listed for Prix Italia.

== Reception ==
His works have been the subject of numerous analyses and critical reviews by distinguished artists and scholars, including Allen S. Weiss, Götz Naleppa, Sheila Davies, Virginia Madsen, Natalia Kowalska-Elkader who have examined their stylistic, conceptual, and cultural significance.

== General references ==
- Jacki Apple, "Screamers", High Performance, Spring, 1992.
- Kristiana Clemens, review, Turned On, Tuning In, Musicworks #95, Spring, 2005, p. 53.
- Kersten Glandien, Art on Air. A Profile of New Radio Art, in: Simon Emmerson (ed), Music, Electronic Media and Culture (Ashgate, 2000).
- Thyrza Nichols Goodeve, "No Wound Ever Speaks For Itself" in Art Forum, January 1992, p. 70.
- Michele Hilmes and Andrew J. Bottomley (eds), The Oxford Handbook of Radio and Podcasting, Oxford Handbooks (2024; online edn, Oxford Academic, 20 June 2024): Contributors, XVI.
- Kowalska-Elkader, N. (2024). Interference, entropy, and the birth of the wound: early works by Gregory Whitehead (1984–1990). Journal of Aesthetics & Culture, 16(1).
- Virginia Madsen, "American radio art and the documentary imagination: breakaway and castaway emissions from broadcast to podcast" In A. Thurmann-Jajes, & R. Beyer (Eds.), Listen up!: Radio Art in the USA (pp. 211–245). (Schriftenreihe für Künstlerpublikationen; Vol. 10).
- Elisabeth Mahoney, review, The Loneliest Road, The Guardian, October 20, 2003.
- Joe Milutis, "Radiophonic Ontologies and the Avant-Garde," TDR 40, no. 3 (Fall 1996): 70, 5.
- Jon Pareles, review, "Five Concerts All at Once, And It's Quiet", New York Times, April 24, 2004.
- Allen S. Weiss, "Purity of Essence", in Breathless: Sound Recording, Disembodiment and the Transformation of Lyrical Nostalgia, Wesleyan University Press, 2002.
