= Reboot.fm =

reboot.fm
- Berlin, Potsdam; Germany
- Broadcast area: Central West Berlin
- Frequencies: 88.4 Berlin & 90.7 Potsdam MHz

Programming
- Format: Community radio, Radio Art

Ownership
- Owner: Klubradio Gmbh

History
- First air date: June 2010

Links
- Website: www.reboot.fm

reboot.fm is an artist-run radio station broadcasting on 88.4 FM in Berlin, and 99.7 FM in Potsdam, Germany. The non-commercial radio is run by klubradio Gmbh and housed in the kunstlerhaus Acud and formerly in the House of World Cultures, Berlin. The station is run by four permanent staff members, including founders Diana McCarty and Pit Schultz. It was founded in 2004. Since 2019, reboot.fm broadcasts on non-profit license via the Radio Netzwerk Berlin e.V. that it co-founded with partners, Cashmere Radio, Wearebornfree! Empowerment Radio, Savvy Funk, Bln.FM and radio mobile.

The radio station has more than 150 regular volunteer program makers, mostly based in Berlin. The more notable program makers include Razi Barakat, DJ Officer, Officer, Detlef Diedrichsen, Hanin Elias, Rex Joswig, Serhat Koeksal, Kotti & Co., Steve Morell, Marold Philippsen, The Toten Crackhuren im Kofferraum, The Voices, Volkan T error & Toby Dope and "Rock n Roll Maria" Maria Zastrow. It has featured interviews with Bilgin Ayata, Hakim Bey, the Black Audio Film Collective, Dietrich Diedrichsen, Coco Fusco, Kenneth Goldman, Gudrun Gut, Grada Kilomba, Lynn Hershman Leeson, Fred Moten, Judy Nylon, Bruce Sterling, Hito Steyerl, Janos Sugar, Brian Kuan Wood and many others.

The political magazine shows feature contemporary political issues related to Berlin that include gentrification, refugee rights and public art policy. In 2011 reboot.fm won first prize for creative web radio.

In 2012, reboot.fm introduced an international advisory board that includes Ute Meta Bauer, Ed Baxter, Franco "Bifo" Berardi, Kodwo Eshun, Anselm Franke, Anna Friz, Andrej Holm, Ipek Ipekcioglu, Tetsuo Kogawa, Matthias Lilienthal, Hans-Ulrich Obrist and Natascha Sadr Haghighian. The station broadcasts art, discourse and electronic music from Berlin. It is a founding member of the award-winning radia.fm cultural radio network.
