= Radia =

International radio network

- Type: radio and online
- Availability: International
- Motto: "New and forgotten ways of making radio"
- Launch date: 2005
- Official website: http://www.radia.fm

Started in April 2005, the Radia network is an international informal network of community radio stations that have a common interest in producing and sharing art works for the radio. In 2024, the network gathers 22 radio stations from 21 cities across 15 countries, speaking 9 different languages. It also organizes linked-up events and special broadcasts. Radia intends to be a space of reflection about today's radio and radio art. Its activities try to contribute to intercultural exchange and artworks' and artists' circulation.

The network's name freely refers to La Radia, a Futurist manifesto written by Filippo Tommaso Marinetti and Pino Masnata in 1933. The network's founders dropped the La to distance themselves from the Futurists' political views. As it stands alone, "radia" is simply "radio" or "radios" in some languages.

== Shows ==
The Radia Network's basis is a weekly 28 minutes show broadcast by all the stations. Each station produces the show in turns. Every round of shows is called a season.

=== Content ===
As stated in their jingle, Radia is "bringing new and forgotten ways of making radio to [their] listeners. Each week [they] give artists the challenge to make radio that works all across Europe and beyond." The Radia show intends to cross boundaries and address people of different languages and cultures. It usually explores the different genres of radio art, separately or by mixing them: sound art, electroacoustic music, sound poetry, radio drama, soundscape.

=== Production ===
Usually each member radio station commissions an artist from their local artistic community and gives him/her carte blanche for producing a show. In that sense, Radia uses radio as a gallery for sound art pieces.

=== Exchange and archive ===
To share the shows the Radia Network formerly used Radioswap.net, a semi-public closed platform for program exchange between community radios. Now it utilizes the server space of one of its member stations. All Radia shows are archived at the Internet Archive.

== Members ==
Members of the Radia Network are radio stations, webradios and art-radio projects that broadcast the Radia weekly show and produce shows in turns.

=== Founding members ===
On 3–7 February 2005, there was a first meeting of radio stations in Berlin under the banner of NERA (New European Radio Art). The decision was taken to start a broadcast season the following April, and an email discussion list was set up on which the name Radia was finally settled on.

Founding members are:

- Resonance FM (London, UK)
- Rádio Zero at the time designated RIIST (Lisbon, Portugal)
- Kanal 103 (Skopje, Macedonia)
- reboot.fm (Berlin, Germany)
- Radio Campus Bruxelles (Brussels, Belgium)
- Radio Cult (Sofia, Bulgaria), inactive since December 2006
- Tilos Radio (Budapest, Hungary), inactive since December 2007
- Orange 94.0 (Vienna, Austria)
- Radio Oxygen (Tirana, Albania), would actually never contribute.

=== New members ===
- Radio Grenouille (Marseille, France), February 2006
- Lemurie TAZ (Prague, Czech Republic), March 2006, inactive since November 2008
- WGXC/Wave Farm at the time designated free103point9 (Acra, New York, USA), first non-European radio station, September 2006
- Radio Panik (Brussels, Belgium), January 2007
- Soundart Radio (Dartington, UK), March 2007
- Radio Corax (Halle, Germany), May 2007, inactive since November 2020
- Radio X (Frankfurt, Germany), April 2008
- XL Air (Brussels, Belgium), June 2008, inactive since July 2018
- CKUT (Montreal, Canada), July 2008, inactive since August 2022
- Radio One (Dunedin, New Zealand), August 2009
- CFRC (Kingston, Canada), December 2009, inactive since December 2019
- Radio Helsinki (Graz, Austria), February 2010
- Radio Papesse (Siena, Italy), March 2010
- Radio WORM (Rotterdam, Netherlands), May 2010
- Escuela Creativa de Radio TEA FM (Zaragoza, Aragon-Spain), January 2011
- Radio Student (Ljubljana, Slovenia), February 2012
- Curious Broadcast (Dublin, Ireland), April 2012, inactive since September 2013
- Radio Valerie (Melbourne, Australia), July 2012, inactive since August 2012
- Jet FM (Nantes, France), October 2012
- Radio Nova (Oslo, Norway), February 2013, inactive since March 2018
- Radio Campus Paris (Paris, France), March 2014, inactive since May 2020
- Eastside FM (Sydney, Australia), May 2015, inactive since December 2017
- Kol HaCampus (Tel Aviv, Israel), May 2016, inactive since September 2017
- DiffusionFM 91.9 (Sydney, Australia), January 2018
- Usmaradio (San Marino), July 2018
- Radio ARA (Luxembourg), January 2019, inactive since December 2022
- *Duuu (Paris, France), August 2022

Syndicating partners who play but do not produce Radia shows are Resonance Extra (Brighton, Bristol, Cambridge, London, Norwich, UK), Radio Campus Paris (Paris, France), CFRU (Guelph, Canada), CKUT (Montreal, Canada), KZradio (Tel Aviv, Israel), Radio ARA (Luxembourg) and Radio Corax (Halle, Germany).

Affiliated to the network are ORF Kunstradio (Vienna, Austria), Mobile Radio (Ürzig, Germany) and Radioart106 (Haifa, Israel).

From 2017 on each season also includes a guest slot reserved for individual producers or radio stations that are not part of the network.

== Special events and broadcasts ==
- 15–18 October 2004: Resonance "Radio Art Riot", a four-night event bringing together some of the foremost radio artists and thinkers from around the world in a studio-as-creative-lab situation which featured round table discussions, live radio art, performances at venues around London and streamed events from other countries. Themes included 'Plunderphonics/Sampling', 'Copyright/Copyleft' and 'Radio Text'. This was the first time that some of the radio stations that would later become Radia worked together - Resonance from the U.K., reboot.fm from Germany, Orange and Kunstradio from Austria, Tilos from Hungary and Radio Cult from Bulgaria.
- 10–14 April 2006: Meeting in Lisbon and co-producing of a radio art festival with Rádio Zero under the banner of RadiaLx2006.
- 15 September 2006: First Radia special, simultaneously broadcast live on 9 radio stations: Time labs is a collection of one-minute pieces from artists of the Radia Network. It was released for the final conference of the radio territories project.
- April 2007: The Radia Network has received an honorary mention at the 2007 Prix Ars Electronica. According to the Ars Electronica website, "The Radia Network is a community of independent radio stations who have combined to facilitate an ongoing shared cultural initiative. The stations, based throughout Europe, share in weekly commissioned pieces that explore radio as an art form. Each station produces a piece in turn, which all of the partners then publish. The pieces do not seek to promote a common language, but to celebrate the diversity of the breadth of their contributors. It uses the possibilities opened up by the net to share the work and ideas not only of the stations but also of the artistic communities that themselves represent the audience of each contributor and then, through extension, of the whole."
- 19 July 2007: The Radia Network is presented at the Radio Grenouille's Grenouille Capitale festival in Paris, with a special piece by Radio Free Robots collective broadcast on Radio Campus Paris.
- 28 October 2007: The Radia Network was invited by the Radiophonic festival in Brussels. Radioactive Radiophony is a 4-hour live show made with in situ and streamed performances, simultaneously broadcast on 13 radio stations.
- December 2007 – January 2008: Diverse retrospectives of the Network's recent activity. 3 journeys through Radia on ÖRF Kunstradio, a Radia retrospective on Resonance FM, Espectro Electro Magnético on Antena 2 (Rádio e Televisão de Portugal).
- 28 February – 8 March 2008: Radia shows are featured daily on the "AV festival radio station" in Newcastle. Besides this regular shows from Radia member stations are broadcast on Soundscape FM in Sunderland.
- 20 to 28 September 2008: the RadiaLx2008 festival hosts a meeting for Radia and promotes Radia shows and Radia artists performances in Lisbon, Portugal.
- 28 December 2008: a special 2008 review/mashup is broadcast at Kunstradio.
- Selected works from the more than, at the time, 200 productions of Radia shows could be listened during the 2009 edition of Festival Silêncio, promoted by Goethe-Institut Lisbon, Portugal.
- A special selection of Radia shows was broadcast during Radio Futura, a temporary station of the Future Places Festival in Porto, 14–17 October 2009.
- Radia gave support to the 3rd edition of the RadiaLx Festival in Lisboa in 2010. Several stations did live streamings to the Festival and other rebroacasted parts of it.
- In September 2010 Radia started uploading its archive into archive.org.
- From 12 to 16 October 2010 the full of season 23 of Radia programmes was re-broadcast during Future Places Festival in O'Porto, Portugal, incorporated in the Radio Futura temporary radio station (91.5 MHz FM Porto).
- From October to December 2010 ORF Kunstradio broadcast a series of five radio art programmes specially curated by Radia, that were recorded during the Radia Art Camp in July 2010 at the Gasometer in Oberhausen.
- From September to December 2012 the first complete retrospective of Radia shows was broadcast on Mobile Radio BSP as part of the 30th Biennial of São Paulo in Brazil.
- During the Radio Revolten festival in Halle, in Germany, - from 7 to 9 October 2016 - a general meeting of the Radia network took place, mixing performances from members and re-tuning the network for the future.
- A 21-part programme series called Radiaphiles showcasing member stations and associated artists of the Radia network was produced for and broadcast as part of documenta 14 in Kassel and Berlin from 17 June - 7 July 2017.
