= Helen Thorington =

American artist and writer (1928–2023)

- Born: Helen Louise Thorington; November 16, 1928; Philadelphia, Pennsylvania, U.S.
- Died: April 13, 2023 (aged 94); Lincoln, Massachusetts, U.S.
- Occupations: Radio artist, sound artist, net artist, writer, founder, producer, director
- Website: sympoietic.net

Helen Louise Thorington (November 16, 1928 – April 13, 2023) was an American radio artist, composer, performer, net artist and writer. She was also the founder of New Radio and Performing Arts (1981), a nonprofit organization based in New York City; the founder and executive producer of New American Radio (1987–1998); and the founder and co-director of Turbulence.org (1996–2016).

Thorington began composing in 1974; her first works were aired on National Public Radio on such programs as Options, Voices in the Wind, and All Things Considered. In 1978, she began composing music for dance, collaborating with Bill T. Jones, Arnie Zane, and Lois Welk. She has performed nationally, including at Kennedy Center, Jacob's Pillow, Dance Theatre Workshop, and The Kitchen. Thorington began creating Internet art in the mid-1990s, co-producing several multimedia, hypertext narratives and networked performances that culminated in an installation of the seminal work, Adrift, at The New Museum in 2001.

== Early life and education ==
Helen Thorington (nickname "Teedy") was born in Philadelphia and grew up in Wynnewood, Pennsylvania. She was the daughter of Richard Wainwright Thorington and Katherine Louise (Moffat) Thorington, and sister of Richard W. Thorington Jr. She was a graduate of The Baldwin School, Bryn Mawr, Pennsylvania and Wellesley College (1950). After graduating with a BA in Biblical History, and attending Union Theological Seminary, New York (1951), Thorington discovered her passion for English literature. She studied English Literature at the University of Minnesota (1956–1958); continued with Special Studies in the English Comic Novel taught by John Bayley (writer), New College, Oxford University, England (1959–1961); and completed coursework for a PhD in English literature at Rutgers University (1965–1967). She compiled the index for Growth and Culture: A Photographic Study of Balinese Childhood by Margaret Mead, and worked as a copy editor at G. P. Putnam's Sons.

== Death ==
Thorington died of complications of Alzheimer's disease on April 13, 2023, at the age of 94.

== Career ==
=== Writing ===
Thorington wrote and published experimental fiction and art criticism. She published short stories and other fiction in the 1970s. The Story, which aired on Public Radio in 1979, was published in Chelsea 36 (1977) and Chelsea 38 (1979). Written in 1977, The Author's Story (November 15) was published in Lost Areas by Oil Books, Sugar Run, Pennsylvania. The Longest Story: A Work in Progress for Adding Machine Tape (1975) was published in Sixth Assembling/A Collection of Otherwise Unpublishable Manuscripts, compiled by Henry Korn, Richard Kostelanetz and Mike Metz. In February 2021 her essay “The Making of American Radio Art” was published in PAJ (journal) by MIT Press.

Rip on/off (Switzerland) published a collection of Thorington's texts, Il est si difficile de trouver le commencement, in 2017. Thorington co-authored with Jacki Apple the limited edition artist's book, The Tower in 2015; published in Contemporary Music Review; and was commissioned by Tate Modern, London (2008) to write Radio, Art, Life: New Contexts. Her essays have been published in several books, including First Person: New Media as Story, Performance, and Game and Unsitely Aesthetics - Uncertain Practices In Contemporary Art.

=== Sound Art ===
==== Radio ====
Thorington found her way to sound through her writing. After publishing Adventures at Frog Hollow in 1973, she was invited to produce a musical version for Towanda Performing Arts, Towanda, Pennsylvania. Having no musical experience, she learned how to use an EML 101 Synthesizer and began creating her own compositions, including Trying to Think (1974) which influenced such artists as Laurie Anderson and Jacki Apple. Later, she began doing her own Field recordings − bats, oil pumps, trains, parrots, frogs − which she mixed with her synthetic sounds, her own and others' voices, and solo improvisations by musicians such as violinist Aurora Manuel ("Piece for Oil Pump and Violin"); cellist Deidre Murray ("Dracula's Wives"); and accordionist Guy Klucsevek ("North Country").

Thorington described her approach to sound this way: "My focus ... has been on radiophonic space. One of the things that distinguishes the electronic media is the ability to separate sound from its source, to remove environmental sound from its location, vocal sound from a person; to be able to cut, manipulate, and alter it in the creation of another kind of work. I liken this to the science of gene manipulation. We've reduced — or, I as a practicing radio artist, reduce — sound to sound data. I am not concerned that it's music, that it's an environment, that it's voice."

In 1979, independent public radio producer Larry Josephson invited Thorington to the Airlie Seminar on the Art of Radio in Quantico, Virginia, where she premiered Dream Sequence. National Public Radio (US) purchased it, and it was among the first radio art works broadcast nationally (1977). Thorington was also commissioned by RAI (Italian radio), RNE (Spanish Radio) and ORF (Austrian radio). Her collaborators included Suzan-Lori Parks, Regine Beyer, Shelley Hirsch, Pamela Z, Agnieszka Waligorska and Sarah Montague.

Thorington spoke at international Radio art conferences and served as the Radio Editor for EAR Magazine from 1987 to 1989. She also curated the CD series Radius which was dedicated to presenting experimental works made for radio broadcast to a wider audience. Her documentaries, dramas, and sound compositions have been aired on radio, internationally, for the past thirty-five years. The New American Radio archive is now in the permanent collection of the Library of Congress.

===== Selected works =====
- Calling to Mind (2005)
- Liberty and Ellis-Fresh Perspectives (2000)
- Fleeting Encounters (1999)
- Parker's MUD Journal (1997)
- North Country (1996)
- Story Space (1995)
- The Hunt Is On: Reflections on the Human Genome Project (1994)
- Going Between (1993)
- In the Devil's Footsteps (1993)
- Dracula's Wives (1992)
- Loco-motive (1992)
- Recipe for a Lark (1992)
- Creative Tracks: Native American Artists in the '90s (1992)
- Partial Perceptions (1991—92)
- Terra dell'Immaginazione (1990)
- Aphids and Others (1990)
- In the Dark (1990)
- Congruent Appeal (1989)
- One to Win (1989)
- Straight Ahead (1989)
- Fiddling Around (1987)
- Hard City Rock: New York City in Sound (1987)
- Natural Classic (1987)
- Building a Universe, Part 2: Rifts, Absences and Omissions (1987)
- Parrot Talk (1986)
- Building a Universe, Part 1 (1985)
- The American Buffalo (1980)
- The Dream Sequence, Part 1 & 2 (1977)
- Trying to Think (1974)

==== Dance ====
Thorington became a participant in the experimental dance scene when she met Bill T. Jones and Arnie Zane through the American Dance Asylum (ADA), which they formed with Lois Welk in the late 1970s. After the ADA moved to Binghamton, New York, Thorington created the sound score for Welk's Matrix, which was performed in concert at the Robeson Center (Binghamton) and The Warren Street Performance Loft (New York City); and The Parking Ramp Dance, which was performed on Henry and Waters Streets' parking ramp, Binghamton. Her early scores for Jones and Zane included the trilogy Monkey Run Road, Blauvelt Mountain, and Valley Cottage. Two of these works were revived for the Bill T. Jones/Arnie Zane Dance Company's 20th anniversary performances at Jacob's Pillow (MA) and The Kitchen (NY). Thorington created the score for Jones' Echo (1979); Sisyphus (1980); and Open Places, a "group work" at the Battery Park Landfill, New York City. She also collaborated with choreographers Victoria Marks, Susan Salanger, Peter Anastos, and Julie Wright.

==== Live performance ====
Thorington performed her compositions live at numerous venues in New York City, including Dance Theatre Workshop, Experimental Intermedia Foundation (EIF), and Roulette. In 1981, an evening was dedicated to three of her works – A Quiet Place, A Short History of Hats, and Good Morning, Good Evening, Where Are You? Conversation #1 – using tape recorder, and acoustic and electronic instruments. Helen Thorington: An Evening of Music, curated by Phil Niblock at the EIF in 1983, included Oil Pumps "a new piece for violin and oil pump; and another for cello and rubbed glass."

In 1997, Thorington co-curated the performance series Performing Bodies and Smart Machines at the Whitney Museum of American Art at Philip Morris with Toni Dove and Jeanette Vuocolo.

==== Video ====
Thorington composed sound scores for Barbara Hammer's Optic Nerve, which premiered at the Berlin Film Festival and the Whitney Biennial (1987), and Endangered, which was shown at the 1989 Whitney Biennial.

==== Awards and Commissions ====
- Deep Wireless Commission (2004)
- Honourable Recognition, PRIX BOHEMIA RADIO FESTIVAL, Czechoslovakia (2003)
- Winner, AETHER FESTIVAL, KUNM-FM, Albuquerque, New Mexico (2003)
- New York Foundation on the Arts Creative Fellowship Award: Emerging Forms for Digital Art (2001)
- Creative Capital Grant for Adrift (2000)
- Creative Capital Grant for Adrift (1999)
- New York State Council on the Arts (NYSCA), Music Commission (1998)
- Meet the Composer Commissioning Program Award (1997)
- Artist in Residence, Harvestworks, Studio Pass, New York City (1996)
- Meet the Composer Commissioning Program Award (1995)
- New York State Council on the Arts, Individual Artists Award, Media (1995)
- Paul Robeson Fund, Radio Grant (1995)
- Paul Robeson Fund, Radio Grant (1994)
- National Endowment for the Arts (NEA), Media Arts Award (1993)
- New York State Council on the Arts (NYSCA), Individual Artists Award, Music Commission (1992)
- Electronic Arts Grants Program of the Experimental Television Center (1992)
- First Prize, MACROPHON, the First International Festival of Radio Art, Poland (1991)
- National Endowment for the Arts (NEA), Media Arts Award (1991)
- New York State Council on the Arts (NYSCA), Individual Artists Award, Media (with Jerri Allyn) (1990)
- National Endowment for the Arts (NEA), Media Arts Award (1990)

=== Not-for-profit ===
In July 1981, Thorington founded New Radio and Performing Arts, Inc. and, with Associate Director Regine Beyer, began soliciting funds from government and private foundations. They secured enough to produce a series of 6 half-hour programs in 1986; 13 works in 1987; and, in 1987, $156,000 from the Corporation for Public Broadcasting for a 52-part series. The commissioned works were collectively broadcast as New American Radio (1987–1998), which went on to commission more than 300 works by national and international artists, including Terry Allen, Jacki Apple, Regine Beyer, Roberto Paci Dalò, Diamanda Galás, Guillermo Gomez-Pena, Shelley Hirsch, Negativland, Pauline Oliveros, Suzan-Lori Parks, Jon Rose and Gregory Whitehead. Thorington also served as executive producer for New American Radio, which was distributed worldwide.

In 1996, Thorington cofounded Turbulence.org, an Internet Art commissioning program and website with co-director Jo-Anne Green. Turbulence commissioned and exhibited more than 369 net art and mixed reality works before it became an archive in 2016. Turbulence.org is permanently archived at MEIAC, the Electronic Literature Organization's The NEXT Museum, and the Rose Goldsen Archive of New Media Art, Cornell University, Ithaca, New York. In 2018, Turbulence.org was exhibited at The New Art Fest in Lisbon and Turbulence: Presentación del archivo digital at Extremadura and Iberoamericano Museum of Contemporary Art (MEIAC) Badajoz, Spain.

=== Networked Art ===
Helen Thorington presenting at "Programmable Media II: Networked Music," a Symposium at Pace Digital Gallery that was also streamed live in Second Life. Photo by Jo-Anne Green

Net Art: Thorington created several works for the Internet, among them Solitaire (with Marianne R. Petit and John Neilson), an interactive narrative experiment that invited users to co-author the piece; North Country, Parts 1 and 2, a hypertext, nonlinear narrative that can be experienced with or without audio accompaniment; and the multi-location, networked performance, Adrift, a cinematic journey across a harbor that included real-time webcam footage, text, 3D graphics, and soundscape. With collaborators Jesse Gilbert and Marek Walczak, Adrift was presented at Ars Electronica, Linz, Austria (1997); the tenth anniversary celebration of Kunstradio, Vienna; and the New Museum of Contemporary Art, New York City in 2002, as well as multiple times online. Adrift was supported by a Creative Capital grant.

Networked Performance: After participating in PORT: Navigating Digital Culture, Thorington, with Jesse Gilbert, produced and performed in multiple networked, musical performances on the web beginning in 1998. Their collaborators included Harvestworks, the Pauline Oliveros Foundation, and Mills College. Thorington co-founded Networked_Performance (2004–2016) and Networked_Music_Review (2007–2016), two research blogs that chronicled network-enabled practice. Thorington has lectured internationally, including at the conference Media in Transition 5: Creativity, Ownership and Collaboration in the Digital Age, Massachusetts Institute for Technology (2007); Digital Arts Weeks, Zurich (2007); and the conference Sounding Cultures, Cornell University, Ithaca, New York (2011).

=== Other ===
In 2001, Thorington created the sound for 9_11_01_scapes, which was included in Magnum Photos online audio/visual essay, "September 11" and The September 11 Digital Archive. The sound score was awarded Winner at the Aether Festival, KUNM-FM, Albuquerque, New Mexico (2003); and Honourable Recognition, Prix Bohemia Radio Festival, Czechoslovakia (2003). Thorington taught numerous courses and workshops, including at Emerson College, Boston, Massachusetts; School of Visual Arts, New York University, New York; School of the Museum of Fine Arts, Boston; and Arts Technology Center, University of New Mexico, Albuquerque, New Mexico.
