= Live Skull (EP) =

EP by Live Skull
- Released: 1984
- Recorded: August 13 – 14, 1983
- Studio: Plaza Sound (New York City, NY)
- Genre: Noise rock, post-punk, no wave
- Length: 18:38
- Label: Massive
- Producer: Live Skull

Live Skull chronology
Live Skull (1984)	Bringing Home the Bait (1985)

Professional ratings
Review scores
Source	Rating
AllMusic	2/5 stars

Live Skull is the debut EP by New York City noise rock band Live Skull. It was released in 1984 on Massive Records.

== Track listing ==
All tracks are written by Live Skull.

Side 1
No.	Title	Length
1.	"Mr. Evil"	3:50
2.	"I Was Wrong"	3:23
3.	"Live Walk"	2:52

Side 2
No.	Title	Length
1.	"Boil"	1:58
2.	"Tourist Trap"	3:15
3.	"Age of Oil & Wax"	3:20

CD issue bonus tracks
No.	Title	Length
7.	"J. Bastard"	1:29
8.	"Drain"	2:36
9.	"Age of Oil & Wax" (live)	3:11
10.	"Live Walk" (live)	2:47
11.	"Make Believe You're Insane" (live)	1:17
12.	"I Was Wrong" (live)	2:55
13.	"Tourist Trap" (live)	3:33
14.	"The Corpse Also Rises"	4:08

== Personnel ==
Adapted from the Live Skull liner notes.

Live Skull

- Mark C. – guitar, vocals
- Marnie Greenholz – bass guitar, vocals
- James Lo – drums
- Tom Paine – guitar, vocals

Production and additional personnel

- Mark Berry – mixing
- Don Hünerberg – recording
- Live Skull – production, mixing
- Rick Prol – illustration

== Release history ==
Region	Date	Label	Format	Catalog
United States	1984	Massive	CS, LP	Fat 1
France	2013	Desire	CD, LP	dsr054
