= Rann (film) =

2010 Indian film by Ram Gopal Varma

- Theatrical release poster
- Directed by: Ram Gopal Verma
- Written by: Rohit G. Banawilkar
- Produced by: Madhu Mantena; Sheetal Vinod Talwar
- Starring: Amitabh Bachchan; Sudeep; Ritesh Deshmukh; Paresh Rawal; Mohnish Bahl
- Cinematography: Amit Roy
- Edited by: Nipun Gupta
- Music by: Sanjeev Kohli; Amar Mohile; Sandeep Patil; Jayesh Gandhi; Kumar Bapi; Dharmaraj Bhatt
- Production companies: Cinergy Pictures; Friday Entertainment Venture; Vistaar Religre Film Fund
- Distributed by: PVR Pictures; Big House Films Production; WSG Pictures
- Release date: 29 January 2010
- Running time: 137 minutes
- Country: India
- Language: Hindi

Rann (transl. Battle) is a 2010 Indian Hindi-language political thriller film written and directed by Ram Gopal Varma. The film stars Amitabh Bachchan, Sudeep, Riteish Deshmukh, Paresh Rawal, and Gul Panag. The film was premiered at the Toronto International Film Festival. The film explores the reality of sensational nature of news and mass media and political nexus.

A strategy mobile video game based on the film was also released by Indiagames as a promotional tie-in.

== Plot ==
Vijay Harshvardhan Malik is a reputed journalist and the CEO of India 24x7, a struggling news channel falling behind to rival channel Headlines 24, headed by Vijay's former employee Amrish Kakkar, which is thriving primarily because of their focus on aesthetic journalism. Malik's son Jay, who has recently returned to India after completing his MBA in the US, runs the channel going against his father's morals. Jay plans to launch new channels much to the disapproval of his father and employee, Purab Shastri, a budding journalist.

Nalini Kashyap, India 24x7's COO, was discovered to be leaking information about launching new shows to Kakkar, which were conceived by Vijay and Jay, in exchange for money. Jay had borrowed ₹ 30 crores from investors to launch new channels and, with India 24x7 failing miserably, is in a large sum of debt. Jay's brother-in-law Naveen Shankalya partners with corrupt politician Mohan Pandey, who orchestrated a bomb blast in Muzaffarnagar, to modify all industrial policies in his favour and eventually become India's biggest industrialist.

Pandey creates a conspiracy involving the Prime Minister Digvijay Hooda, his associate Atul Kumar Dubey and another man allegedly named Khanna. Dubey and Khanna are forced by Pandey and are recorded by Jay to discuss the aftermath of the bomb blast and falsely accuse Hooda of organising the blast to create fear amongst the public. Jay shows the footage to Vijay and convinces him to expose Hooda to the public immediately. Vijay, being honest and dutiful, addresses the fabricated news to the public. This leads to a coup d'état and several journalists sabotage the footage to make Hooda seem guilty. Pandey assassinates Dubey and Khanna to ensure that there are no obstacles, whilst Khanna's identity and whereabouts are still under speculation from the public. In the elections, Pandey becomes the frontrunner to be elected as Prime Minister.

Meanwhile, Purab suspects that there is foul play involved after having noticed the increasing number of benefits the channel has received despite being in financial decline. During an interview with Pandey, Purab begins to question Pandey about his crimes but is stopped by Jay, who threatens to fire him. Purab, having realised that Jay is working with Pandey, goes undercover under the alias of Khanna. Jay, distressed about the message he receives from Khanna's impersonator, reaches Khanna's residence. Purab follows him and is shocked to learn that Khanna was Jay's friend from college.

Upon Nalini's insistence, Purab reluctantly visits Kakkar, who appears to be having similar suspicions. Despite being aware of Kakkar's intentions to overthrow his mentor's channel, Purab ultimately submits the evidence he has with the hope that Kakkar would reveal the truth behind the scandal. Nevertheless, Kakkar is shown to be just as corrupt when he gives away the evidence to Pandey after extorting 500 crores from him, in exchange for not exposing his crimes. Purab confronts him whilst secretly recording their conversation about the conspiracy.

Purab, left with no other option, reveals the conspiracy to Vijay and presents all the evidence he has collected, including Kakkar's testimony. Vijay, distraught upon realising that he is responsible for the scandal, goes on-air to expose everyone involved in the scandal, including his own son. During the oath-taking ceremony, Pandey is subjected to public outrage as Vijay's segment gets broadcast. In the aftermath, Vijay's daughter Priya leaves Naveen and takes their son with her. Jay, unable to bear the guilt, commits suicide by jumping off the balcony of his apartment. Kakkar hires a reputed lawyer to help him avoid legal punishment but fails, while Vijay resigns from his post at India 24x7 with Purab taking over as CEO as only he has the courage to expose corruption.

== Cast ==
- Amitabh Bachchan as Vijay Harshvardhan Malik
- Ritesh Deshmukh as Purab Shastri
- Sudeep as Jay V. Malik, Vijay's son
- Paresh Rawal as Mohan Pandey
- Mohnish Bahl as Amrish Kakkar
- Rajat Kapoor as Naveen Shankalya, Vijay's son-in-law
- Rajpal Yadav as Anand Prakash Trivedi
- Gul Panag as Nandita Sharma, Purab's girlfriend
- Suchitra Krishnamurthy as Nalini Kashyap
- Neena Kulkarni as Lata Malik, Vijay's wife
- Neetu Chandra as Yasmin Hussain, Jay's girlfriend
- Simone Singh as Priya Malik Shankalya, Vijay's daughter, Jay's sister and Naveen's wife
- Rahul Pendkalkar as Tinu Shankalya, Priya and Naveen's son, Vijay's grandson
- K. K. Raina as Prime Minister Digvijay Hooda
- Anuj Tikku as Khanna
- Rajkummar Rao in an uncredited appearance as a news reporter

== Reception ==
Taran Adarsh praised the film and its cast, especially Amitabh Bachchan. Nikhat Kazmi of the Times of India gave the film four stars, calling it a "riveting experience." Noyon Jyoti Parasara of AOL gave the film 3.5 out of a possible 5 and said, "Overall, 'Rann' is quite an inspirational fare. It might just teach you to own up and admit that you were wrong at point." while other critics complained that the film is cliché.

== Soundtrack ==
Rann

Soundtrack album by Amar Mohile Dharam-Sandeep Bapi-Tutul Sanjeev Kohli Jayesh Gandhi
- Released: 2010
- Genre: Feature film soundtrack
- Length: 29:06
- Label: Times Music
External audio
- Official Audio Jukebox on YouTube

The film's music is composed by Amar Mohile, Dharmaraj Bhatt, Sandeep Patil, Kumar Bapi, Sanjeev Kohli and Jayesh Gandhi. The lyrics were written by Prashant Pandey and Sarim Momin. The title song, "Rann Hai", was written by Vayu. The background score of the film was composed by Dharmaraj Bhatt and Sandeep Patil. The track "Sikkon Ki Bhook" was also composed by the duo. The lyrics are written by Vayu.

No.	Title	Length
1.	"Sikkon Ki Bhook"
2.	"Remote Ko Baahar Phek"
3.	"Kaanch Ke Jaise"
4.	"Rann Hai"
5.	"Gali Gali Mein"
6.	"Besharam"
7.	"Mera Bharat Mahaan"
