= Pusherman (EP) =

EP by Live Skull
- Released: 1986
- Recorded: April 4 – 5, 1986
- Studio: BC Studio (Brooklyn, NY)
- Genre: Noise rock, post-punk
- Length: 16:20
- Label: Homestead
- Producer: Live Skull

Live Skull chronology
| Cloud One (1986) | Pusherman (1986) | Don't Get Any on You (1987) |

Professional ratings
Review scores
| Source | Rating |
|---|---|
| AllMusic | 3.5/5 stars |

Pusherman is an EP by New York City noise rock band Live Skull, released in 1986 by Homestead Records. The EP's title track is a cover of "Pusherman" by Curtis Mayfield.

== Track listing ==
All tracks are written by Live Skull, except "Pusherman" by Curtis Mayfield.

Side 1
| No. | Title | Length |
|---|---|---|
| 1. | "Swingtime" | 4:47 |
| 2. | "Raise the Manifestation" | 4:57 |

Side 2
| No. | Title | Length |
|---|---|---|
| 1. | "Pusherman" (Curtis Mayfield cover) | 6:36 |

CD issue bonus tracks
| No. | Title | Length |
|---|---|---|
| 4. | "Basket Case Mash-Up" | 2:43 |
| 5. | "Bell Shaped Heads" (live) | 3:19 |
| 6. | "Wallow in It" (live) | 5:13 |
| 7. | "I'll Break You" (live) | 4:37 |
| 8. | "Bootcamp" (live) | 4:50 |
| 9. | "Raise the Manifestation" (live) | 5:08 |

== Personnel ==
Adapted from the Pusherman liner notes.

Live Skull

- Mark C. – guitar, vocals
- Marnie Greenholz – bass guitar, vocals
- James Lo – drums
- Tom Paine – guitar, vocals

Production and additional personnel

- Martin Bisi – mixing, recording
- Scott Miller – cover art, painting
- Live Skull – production, mixing

== Release history ==
| Region | Date | Label | Format | Catalog |
|---|---|---|---|---|
| United States | 1986 | Homestead | LP | HMS 080 |
| France | 2014 | Desire | CD, LP | dsr086 |
