= Wang Li =

Wang Li or Li Wang may refer to the following Chinese people:

- Wang Li (linguist) (王力; 1900–1986), linguist of Chinese
- Wang Li (politician) (王力; 1922–1996), politician, member of the Cultural Revolution Group
- Wang Li (cyclist) (王莉; born 1962), Olympic cyclist
- Wang Li (pianist) (王犁; born 1974), pianist
- Wang Li (actor) (王力), in 2 Champions of Shaolin

== See also ==
- Wan Li
