= New Radio and Performing Arts =

American nonprofit organization

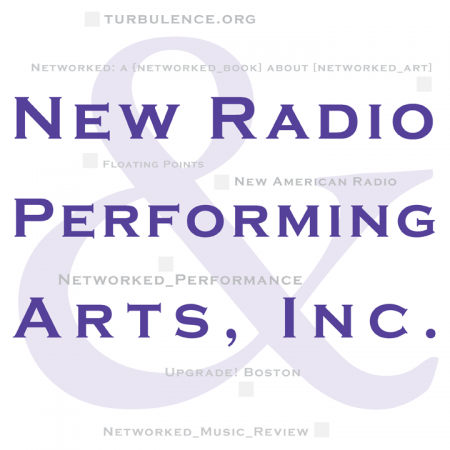
- Founded: 1981
- Founder: Helen Thorington
- Dissolved: 2017
- Type: Art nonprofit
- Location: New York, New York, Boston, Massachusetts United States
- Key people: Helen Thorington, Regine Beyer, Jo-Anne Green

New Radio and Performing Arts, Inc. (NRPA), and its satellite project Turbulence.org, was an American organization that commissioned and archived new and experimental radio art, sound art, net art and mixed reality art. It was founded in 1981 by Helen Thorington. In 2003, NRPA opened an office in Boston, Massachusetts. The organization closed in December 2017.

== New American Radio ==
NRPA is known for its New American Radio series, a weekly public radio program of its commissioned experimental sound art pieces from 1987 to 1998. Their archive, available online since 2002, includes "over 300 works by artists such as Helen Thorington, Gregory Whitehead, Hildegard Westerkamp, Jacki Apple, Pauline Oliveros, Christian Marclay, and Terry Allen". New American Radio is archived at the Library of Congress, Neues Museum Weserburg, Bremen, Germany, Wave Farm, New York and Wesleyan University.

== Turbulence.org ==
With the launch of Turbulence.org in 1996, NRPA expanded its mandate to "regularly commission net art from the US and abroad" and it now holds the largest archive of such work. Through open calls, competitions and awards, the group supports exhibitions "in real space, as well as on the Web," "from full-blown museum exhibitions to esoteric hacks," and acts as an "incubator" for "high-tech art".

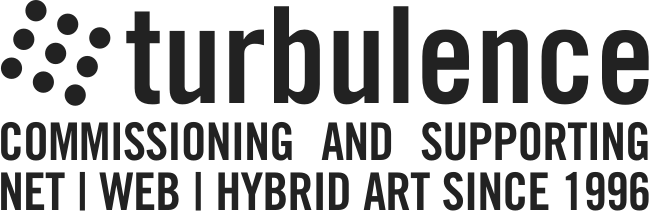

From 1996, NRPA's main focus was on supporting established and emerging artists to create net art/Internet Art or networked hybrid art (art for both virtual and physical space) by: 1) commissioning work for Turbulence.org (over 225 commissions ranging from $1,000-$25,000); 2) providing exhibition venues on- and offline; 3) archiving the work. Notable commissioned artists include Martin Wattenberg, Brooke Singer, Golan Levin, Annie Abrahams, Mary Flanagan, Scott Kildall, Kate Armstrong, Michael Tippett, Nathaniel Stern, Michael Takeo Magruder, Cory Arcangel, Stephanie Rothenberg, R. Luke DuBois, Ursula Endlicher, MTAA, and Zoe Beloff.

In 2018, Turbulence.org was exhibited at The New Art Fest in Lisbon. and Turbulence: Presentación del archivo digital at Extremadura and Iberoamericano Museum of Contemporary Art (MEIAC) Badajoz, Spain. Turbulence.org is permanently archived at MEIAC, the Electronic Literature Organization, the Rose Goldsen Archive of New Media Art, Cornell University, Ithaca, New York and the Library of Congress.

== Collaborations ==
NRPA partnered with many organizations, festivals, galleries, educational institutions Brown University, Cornell University, Emerson College, Wesleyan University) and networks to extend its online activities into the physical world; these included Art Interactive, the Boston Cyberarts Festival, Huret & Spectre Gallery, Lumen Eclipse and Pace Digital Art Gallery. It also partnered with other online platforms, including Ars Virtua, Electronic Literature Organization, Low-fi, MGFest, Rhizome, and Upgrade! International. These activities collectively broadened NRPA's network/audience and, perhaps more importantly, encouraged artists working in more traditional media to experiment with emerging networked technologies.
