= Jo-Anne Green =

American artist (born 1959)

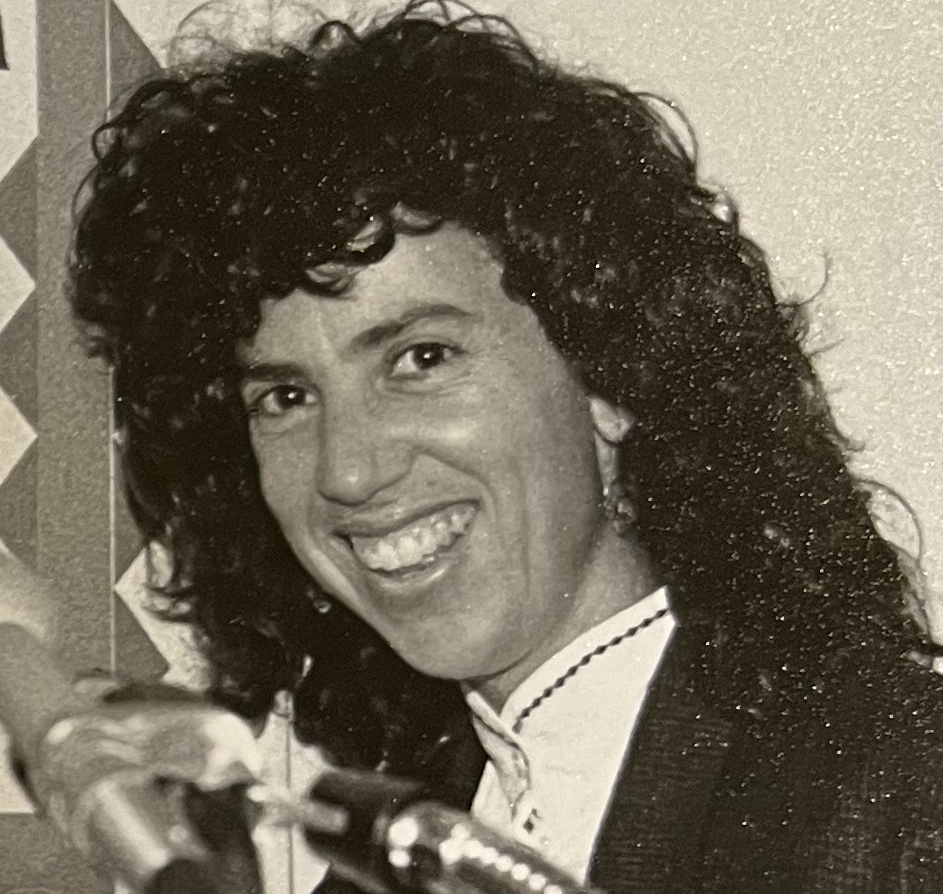
- Green in 1991
- Born: Jo-Anne Green; 14 August 1959; Johannesburg, South Africa
- Died: January 17, 2025 (aged 65); Mancester, New Hampshire, United States
- Education: University of the Witwatersrand (BFA Honors); UMASS Dartmouth (MFA); Lesley University (MS)
- Occupations: Artists Books, Arts Administrator, Digital Artist, Educator, Painter, Photographer, Printmaker, Writer
- Employer(s): School of the Museum of Fine Arts; Emerson College; University of Massachusetts
- Organization(s): Co-Director, New Radio and Performing Arts. Inc. (NPRA) (2002-2017)
- Partner: Helen "Teedy" Thorington
- Website: https://monoskop.org/Jo-Anne_Green https://sympoietic.net/jo/

Jo-Anne "Jo" Green (born August 14, 1959 Johannesburg, South Africa) is a printmaker, visual artist, artist, arts administrator, writer, and educator who lived and worked in Jerusalem; New York City, New York; Albuquerque, New Mexico; and Boston, Massachusetts. She cofounded several non-profit organizations to support net art and experiments in digital and electronic literature and art.

== Education ==
Green attended the University of the Witwatersrand where she graduated with a BFA Honors in Printmaking, majoring in Art History and Painting, in 1981. In 1983, she emigrated to the United States where she attended Southeastern Massachusetts University (now UMASS Dartmouth) and Lesley University, graduating with an MFA in Visual Arts (1989) and an MA in Arts Administration (2003). In 1999, at the University of New Mexico's High Performance Computing Center, Green founded the artist-in-residence program and managed the Art Technology Center until June 2001, when she returned to Boston to complete her MS in Art Administration at Lesley University in 2003. She also taught part-time at Emerson College.

== Personal life ==
Green lived in Boston for thirty-two years and in Albuquerque, New Mexico (UNM) from 1996-2001. She worked as a Graphic Designer at the University of New Mexico’s High Performance Computing Center where she founded the artist-in-residence program that led to the formation of the Art Technology Center (ATC): it was there, in 2001, that she met her life partner Helen L. Thorington. Green was Program Coordinator for both the ATC and the Arts of the Americas Institute at UNM from 1999-2001. She returned to Boston in 2001, and joined New Radio and Performing Arts, Inc. in 2002: she designed websites, brochures, logos and postcards; and engaged in grant writing and fundraising, among other responsibilities.

== Work ==
Green had her first art exhibition, with Kim Berman, in Johannesburg (1982). She made prints, paintings, artist’s books and installations, many of them grappling with Apartheid, violence, and chronic pain which she suffered for more than thirty years. In 1989, her MFA Thesis exhibition was accepted by the Cambridge Multicultural Arts, Center; she participated in numerous group exhibitions in Boston and New York. Her one-of-a-kind artist book, “Waiting and Remembering,” was acquired by the Jack Ginsberg Centre for Book Arts at Wits Art Museum, Johannesburg, South Africa where it was shown at the inaugural exhibition of the collection.

Green co-founded Cultural Resistance in 1985, organizing South African art exhibitions and video screenings, and designing and publishing a monthly newsletter, UNCENSORED, with her collaborators Kim Berman and Rachel Weisz. Cultural Resistance was a project of Fund for a Free South Africa (FreeSA) where she volunteered from 1984-1990, culminating in Nelson Mandela’s visit to Boston.

Green was co-director of New Radio and Performing Arts, Inc. (NRPA) from 2002 to 2016 where she founded Upgrade! Boston and curated exhibitions at Art Interactive, funded by the LEF Foundation) and the Huret & Spectre Gallery (funded by the Andy Warhol Foundation for the Visual Arts). NRPA was founded in 1981 to foster the development of new and experimental work for radio and sound arts. It commissioned and distributed 300 works for New American Radio (newamericanradio.org). While at NRPA, Jo-Anne Green also wrote essays that focused on art processes, including Interactivity and Agency in Real-Time Systems.

In early 1996, NRPA extended its mandate to net art. To achieve this, Helen Thorington founded Turbulence.org and Jo-Anne Green joined her in 2002. Turbulence commissioned, exhibited, and archived 356 works that creatively explored the Internet as a site of production and transmission; and supported experimentation with distributed real-time multilocation performance events. The site was produced in New York and Boston and got about 150,000 to 250,000 visitors per month as of 2006. It was also home to two blogs: Networked_Performance and Networked_Music_Review. Other major projects include Networked: a (networked_book) about (networked_art); Mixed Realities (2007); Pulsed Pull Installation Upgrade! Boston; and New England Initiative II. This site defined network performance as "any work that is enabled by computer networks ... which engage users in a performative experience."

She has also organized several exhibitions at Pace Digital Gallery(PDG), Manhattan, New York as well as Green co-organized multiple symposia at PDG as well as the Floating Points speaker series at Emerson College, Boston Massachusetts.

=== Exhibitions and curations ===
Green used digital technology and her background as a painter and photographer for her art. Green has exhibited her artwork in Johannesburg, Boston, and New York, mounting her first solo exhibition, "Well, as a result..." at Different Angle Gallery in 1990. The exhibition examined the slow transition from oppression to freedom, and was informed by her experiences in her native South Africa. The opening of the exhibition celebrated Nelson Mandela and the African National Congress with a performance of South African music.

Title	Type	Year
Pursuing Reality: Possibilities, Harvard Arboretum ,	Solo	10/20/2023-2/18/2024
Jack Ginsberg Centre for Book Arts Opening Exhibition, Wits Art Museum, Johannesburg, South Africa	Group	2019
Five, Greylock Arts, Adams, Massachusetts, United States	Group	2012
Greylock's Anatomy, Greylock Arts, Adams, Massachusetts	Group	2011
Violence Online Festival 6.0, newmediafest.org	Group	2003
Coming and Going: Beyond the Homeland, Cambridge Multicultural Art Center, Cambridge, Massachusetts	Group	1992
Caution Art, Thomas Segal Gallery, Boston, Massachusetts	Group	1991
Voices From South African Artists, Stuart Levy Gallery, New York, New York	Group	1990
Well, as a result... Different Angle Gallery, Boston, Massachusetts	Solo	1990
Works on South Africa and Slavery, Cambridge Multicultural Art Center, Cambridge, Massachusetts, 1989	Two-person	1989
Five South African Artists, 301 Huron Avenue, Cambridge, Massachusetts	Group	1989
Evils of Power, UMASS Dartmouth Art Gallery, Dartmouth, Massachusetts	Group	1986
Women's Work: Political Art by Women, Femmecore Space, Boston, Massachusetts	Group	1986
Choices: Four South African Artists, Four Walls Gallery, Hoboken, New Jersey	Group	1986
Between the Covers: Artist's Handmade Books, Massachusetts College of Art, Boston, Massachusetts	Group	1985
Symphonies and the System, Trevor Coleman Gallery, Johannesburg, South Africa	Two-person	1982

Curator
Title	Role	Year
KIKI: Migrant Family Life in a South African Compound, a traveling exhibition of photographs by Roger Meintjies; Clark University, Worcester, MA; New England School of Photography, Boston, MA; Pianocraft Gallery, Boston, MA; Boston Public Library, Boston, MA; and Emory University, Atlanta, Georgia	Co-curator	1991
South African Mail: Messages from Within, Boston Public Library, Boston, Massachusetts	Co-curator	1991
An Act of Resistance: Making Community(ies), Mobius, Boston, Massachusetts	Co-curator	1993
DIY or DIE: an Upgrade! New York, Turbulence and Rhizome Net Art Exhibition, IAO Gallery, Upgrade! International Oklahoma City, OK and online at Rhizome.org and Turbulence.org	Co-curator	2006
David Crawford: Retrospective, Pace Digital Gallery, New York, New York	Co-curator	2010
Arrested Time: Nathaniel Stern with Jessica Meuninck-Ganger, Greylock Arts, Adams, Massachusetts	Curator	2010
Networked Realities: (Re)Connecting the Adamses, Greylock Arts and MCLA Gallery 51, Adams, Massachusetts	Co-curator	2008
Internet Art in the Global South, Johannesburg Art Fair, South Africa	Co-curator	2009
Turbulence.org New England Initiative II: Networked Art Commissions, Art Interactive, Cambridge Massachusetts	Curator	2006
