= Bringing Home the Bait =

Studio album by Live Skull
- Released: 1985
- Recorded: 1984
- Studio: Evergreen Studio (New York City, NY)
- Genre: Noise rock, post-punk
- Length: 39:19
- Label: Homestead
- Producer: Live Skull

Live Skull chronology
Live Skull (1984)	Bringing Home the Bait (1985)	Cloud One (1986)

Professional ratings
Review scores
Source	Rating
AllMusic	2/5 stars

Bringing Home the Bait is the debut studio album by New York City noise rock band Live Skull, released in 1985 by Homestead Records.

== Track listing ==
All tracks are written by Live Skull.

Side 1
No.	Title	Length
1.	"Sparky"	3:51
2.	"Brains Big Enough"	5:24
3.	"Glee Product"	1:47
4.	"Ha Ha Ditch"	3:13
5.	"Four"	2:47
6.	"Houseboy"	3:05

Side 2
No.	Title	Length
1.	"Wisdom & Gravy"	3:50
2.	"Common Cruelty"	3:54
3.	"Skin Job"	3:10
4.	"Jerking the Light"	4:25
5.	"Goodbye to the Uninvited Guests"	0:38
6.	"Flake Out"	3:15

CD issue bonus tracks
No.	Title	Length
13.	"Pulverized By Gratitude"	0:38
14.	"Ha Ha Ditch" (live)	4:03
15.	"Glee Product" (live)	1:57
16.	"Houseboy" (live)	2:41
17.	"Flake Out" (live)	3:15
18.	"Brains Big Enough" (live)	5:38
19.	"Bad Hospital"	2:31

== Personnel ==
Adapted from the Bringing Home the Bait liner notes.

Live Skull

- Mark C. – guitar, vocals, photography
- Marnie Greenholz – bass guitar, vocals
- James Lo – drums
- Tom Paine – guitar, vocals

Production and additional personnel

- Martin Bisi – mixing
- Live Skull – production, mixing
- Hahn Rowe – engineering
- Porky – cutting engineer

== Release history ==
Region	Date	Label	Format	Catalog
United States	1985	Homestead	LP	HMS 022
France	2013	Desire	CD, LP	dsr057
