= Live Skull =

American band

- Origin: New York City
- Genres: Post-punk, noise rock, no wave, experimental rock, alternative rock
- Years active: 1982–1990, 2016–present
- Labels: Massive Records; Homestead; Caroline; What Goes On; Desire Records; Bronson Recordings
- Members: Mark C. Richard Hutchins; Dave Hollinghurst; Colyn Hunt
- Past members: Tom Paine; Marnie Greenholz; James Lo; Thalia Zedek; Dan Braun; Julie Hair; Sonda Andersson; Kent Heine

Live Skull is a post-punk/experimental rock band from New York City, formed in 1982.

In an overview of their abrasive no wave-influenced music, Trouser Press said, "As part of the same New York avant-noisy scene that spawned Sonic Youth, Lydia Lunch, and Swans, Live Skull records come complete with creepy lyrics, circular melodies and nod-out drum beats designed to lull you into their macabre world".

== History ==
Live Skull formed in downtown New York City in 1982, founded by tandem guitarists Mark C. and Tom Paine (birth name: Lance Goldenberg). Both had previously been members of San Francisco band Crop along with brothers Ivan and Andrew Nahem (later of Swans and Ritual Tension), before moving to New York in 1980.

Live Skull's earliest lineup included Julie Hair on vocals and Dan Braun (formerly of Spinal Root Gang and Circus Mort) on drums. They were soon joined by drummer James Lo and bassist Marnie Greenholz. With this lineup of the band, lead vocals were shared by Mark C., Greenholz and Paine.

Cover of 1984 Live Skull record by Rick Prol

In 1983, Tom Paine was an executive producer of Speed Trials, a landmark five-day no wave music and performance festival held from May 4–8 at the White Columns gallery in New York City.

In 1984, Live Skull released their self-titled debut 12-inch EP on Massive Records. After signing to Homestead Records, they released their 1985 debut full-length, Bringing Home the Bait.

Tom Paine served as the contributing curator for Tellus Audio Cassette Magazine #10: All Guitars!, a landmark 1985 audio cassette compilation.

The follow-up LP to Bringing Home the Bait was 1986's Cloud One, featured slightly more accessible song structures. A live album titled Don't Get Any on You was recorded at CBGB later that year, followed by the Pusherman 12-inch EP.

Thalia Zedek joined the band as lead singer in 1987, taking over most of the vocal duties so that the other members could concentrate on their instruments. Zedek had previously played in the Boston-area post-punk outfits White Women, Dangerous Birds and Uzi. The band also replaced Lo with ex-Ruin drummer Richard Hutchins. Zedek and Hutchins debuted on 1987's Dusted, which spawned a black-and-white music video for the song "5-D". This video later appeared on the Twelve O'Clock High Volume 1 (1989, Atavistic) video compilation.

The group next signed to Caroline Records, which issued 1988's six-song Snuffer 12-inch EP. Greenholz subsequently left and was replaced by Sonda Andersson, a former member of Rat at Rat R and cousin of avant-garde composer Glenn Branca. Released in 1989, Positraction was a more accessible, song-oriented effort that continued their generally positive critical reaction. Live Skull disbanded in 1990 due to sustained lack of commercial success, with Paine deciding to focus on an alternate career.

== Post-breakup and other activity ==
Mark C. was involved in various other New York music projects, including Spoiler; Int'l Shades (with ex-Sonic Youth drummer Bob Bert), which released the Hash Wednesday album in 2005 on Cass Records; and Outpost 13 (including Kent Heine of The Holy Ghost and Stuart Argabright of Ike Yard).

Paine received a Master of Fine Arts degree in film at the University of South Florida in Tampa, and writes about world cinema.

Braun later played with Swans (for a short time in 1982, and then again on their 1991 album Body to Body, Job to Job), the Del-Byzanteens, Glenn Branca, Radio Firefight and Deep Six.

Hair later played with 3 Teens Kill 4 and Bite Like a Kitty.

Mark C. and Greenholz briefly reunited in the band Fuse, which released a double 7-inch EP, Dana's Room, in 1992 on the PCP Entertainment label.

Greenholz, under the name Marnie Jaffe, co-founded Fairmount Girls in Cincinnati, Ohio, and played on their debut album, Eleven Minutes to Anywhere, released on Deary Me Records in 1999.

Lo later drummed for Wider and then for Chavez in the mid-1990s.

Zedek moved back to Boston and fronted the blues-rock-oriented Come, who signed to Matador Records. She has released several solo albums since Come's 2001 demise.

Hutchins performed for several years in Of Cabbages and Kings, Phideaux and Digitalis. The latter band featured John Meyers (another former Rat at Rat R member) and Reverb Motherfuckers guitarist Skinny John, as well as early Live Skull member Hair. Digitalis split up around 1998, and Hair and Hutchins married in 2000. The couple were both members of Hungry March Band for many years. In the late 2000s, Hutchins was also a member of Lubricated Goat and Lubricated Goat frontman Stu Spasm's side project LoveStruck. Hutchins currently performs in the Art Gray Noizz Quintet and Isolation Society which also features Julie Hair, and Ian Wilson formerly in Star Spangles.

== Reunion ==
On January 16, 2016, Mark C., Jaffe and Hutchins reunited as Live Skull to perform and record several new songs at Martin Bisi's B.C. Studio, as part of the studio's semi-private, 35th anniversary "Recording of the Century" event.

In November 2019, the band released their album Saturday Night Massacre, followed by Dangerous Visions in 2020. The band's current core consists of Mark C., Rich Hutchins, Kent Heine and Dave Hollinghurst. Thalia Zedek and Marnie Greenholz occasionally join them in studio and live shows.

== Band members ==
Current members

- Mark C. – guitar, vocals, synth, harmonica (1982–1990, 2016–present)
- Richard Hutchins – drums (1987–1990, 2016–present)
- Dave Hollinghurst - guitar, vocals (2019–present)
- Colyn Hunt - bass (2024–present)

Former members

- Tom Paine – guitar, vocals (1982–1990)
- Marnie Greenholz – bass, vocals (1982–1988, 2016–2018)
- James Lo – drums (1982–1987)
- Thalia Zedek – vocals, guitar, harmonica, clarinet (1987–1990, 2018)
- Sonda Andersson – bass (1988–1990)
- Julie Hair – vocals (1982)
- Dan Braun – drums (1982)
- Kent Heine - bass (2018–2024)
- Hannah Moorhead – bass (2021; touring member)

== Discography ==
=== Studio albums ===
- Bringing Home the Bait (1985, Homestead Records)
- Cloud One (1986, Homestead Records)
- Dusted (1987, Homestead Records)
- Positraction (1989, Caroline Records/What Goes On Records)
- Saturday Night Massacre (2019, Bronson Recordings)
- Dangerous Visions (2020, Bronson Recordings)
- Party Zero (2023, Bronson Recordings)
- What Could Go Wrong? (2026, Bronson Recordings)

=== EPs ===
- Live Skull (1984, Massive Records)
- Pusherman (1986, Homestead Records)
- Snuffer (1988, Caroline Records/What Goes On Records)

=== Live albums ===
- Don't Get Any on You (1987, Homestead Records)

=== Live videos ===
- Live Skull (1988, Atavistic/Jettisoundz)
- Live Skull Live (1989, Videophile)

=== Compilation appearances ===
- Untitled on Bang Zoom Issue #6 cassette (1983, Bang Zoom)
- Corpse on Tellus #1 cassette (1983, Tellus Audio Cassette Magazine)
- Common Cruelty on Terminal! 8" flexi (1984, Terminal fanzine issue No.18)
- I Was Wrong on Speed Trials (1985, Homestead Records)
- Pulverized by Gratitude on Tellus #8 USA/Germany cassette (1985, Tellus Audio Cassette Magazine)
- Bad Hospital on Tellus #10 - All Guitars! cassette (1985, Tellus Audio Cassette Magazine)
- Flake Out on Plow! (1985, Organik)
- Mr. Evil on Here's Your Meat (Vol. 1) Take Home Treats From I.L.A. cassette (1986, Independent Label Alliance)
- Fort Belvedere on The Wailing Ultimate - The Homestead Records Compilation (1986, Homestead Records)
- Alive Again on Human Music (1988, Homestead Records)
- Paul Revere's Bush (Tree Girl) on Sounds and Shigaku Limited Present: Beautiful Happiness (1988, Sounds and Shigaku Limited)
- 5·D video on Mouthful of Sweat: The Chemical Imbalance Video Compilation (1988, Atavistic Video)
- 5·D video on Twelve O'Clock High (1989, Atavistic Video)
- Safe From Me on Pushing the Limits of Standard Chaos (Sampler NMS '89) cassette (1989, Caroline Records)
- Tri-Power on Like a Girl, I Want You to Keep Coming (1989, Giorno Poetry Systems)
- Details of the Madness on BC 35 / The 35 Year Anniversary of BC Studio (2018, Sleeping Giant Glossolalia/Bronson Recordings)
- Up Against the Wall on BC 35 Volume Two / The 35 Year Anniversary of BC Studio (2019, Bronson Recordings)
- Off the Runway & Debbie's Headache (Live) on Quarantine Tales from the Red Desert (2020, Bronson Recordings)
