= Rádio Zero =

- Lisbon, Portugal; Portugal

Programming
- Language: Portuguese (de facto)
- Format: Campus radio, Experimental, Community radio, Free, Online

Ownership
- Owner: Associação dos Estudantes do Instituto Superior Técnico

History
- First air date: April 26, 2004 (as RIIST); March 6, 2006 (as Rádio Zero)
- Last air date: 2022

Links
- Webcast: radiozero.pt/ouvir
- Website: radiozero.pt

Rádio Zero (also called Zero) was a non-profit webradio with an academic origin and nature, based at the Instituto Superior Técnico in Lisbon. Its stated mission was to serve as a free access to production and broadcast of radio programs by society in general. Its programming was filled with author programmes, ranging from the conventional or informative, to the more experimental where radio is considered an artwork. Zero broadcast online continuously and also did temporary FM events.

Rádio Zero was a founding member of Radia, an international radio network of independent radio stations.

== Background ==
=== Secção Sonora (in the 1950s) ===
In the 1950s there was a section dedicated to classical music broadcasting through the speakers of AEIST building. In his speech at the formal sitting celebrating the centenary of AEIST, Mário Lino, the Minister of Public Works, Transportation and Communication in the 17th Constitutional Government of Portugal, mentioned that he had taken part in activities of this section while a student in Instituto Superior Técnico.

=== Rádio Universidade Tejo (1986–1988) ===
Rádio Universidade Tejo (RUT) was a pirate station started in 1986, that initially broadcast from the AEIST building in 99.5 MHz, and afterwards in 100.7 MHz. It was closed in 1988.

=== RIIST (1995–2000) ===
In 1995 a group of students at the AEIST, created a new campus radio named of Rádio Interna do IST/RIIST (IST Internal Radio), transmitting only through speakers installed in the campus. By the academic season of 1999 / 2000 it became an internet stream as well. This group disappeared in 2000.

== Reactivation ==
=== RIIST (2004–2006) ===
In May 2002, a group of students of IST, composed by Alexandre Rio, André Duarte, André Santos, Bartolomeu Bernardes, Bernardo Mendes, David Santos, Edgar Lopes, Joana Batista, João Aguiar, João Pina, Ricardo Ramires, Ricardo Ressureição and Tiago Carvalho, decided to reactivate the extinct RIIST. Some of them ran for the administration of the student's union AEIST (cultural and creative section), whereas others were non-official supporters of the other candidates. Despite not being elected, the whole group decided in that same September to start the procedures to reopen RIIST. In 2003 several students recovered the radio section. The broadcast restarted on April 26, 2004. In 2005, during the Transmediale in Berlin, the RIIST co-founded and presented along with nine other radio stations (Resonance FM, UK; Bootlab, Germany; Tilos Radio, Hungary; Radio Campus, Belgium; Kunstradio, Austria; Orange, Austria; Radio Cult, Bulgaria; Kanal103, Macedonia; and Oxygen, Albania) the radio network Radia.

=== Rádio Zero (2006–2022) ===
By decision of its members, the RIIST name was changed to Rádio Zero, effective on March 6, 2006.

== Relevant dates ==
- 2004 – Launch emission of RIIST on the 26th April
- 2006 – First edition of the International Festival of Radio Art - RadiaLx
- 2008 – Second edition of RadiaLx
- 2009 – Radio Futura, for Future Places Festival 2009, transmitting non-stop at 91.5 MHz, in Porto (October 14–17)
- 2009 – Release of Zero Labs, a group that develops community radio-related technologies
- 2010 – Third edition of RadiaLx (July 1–3), which included a temporary (June 27 - July 4) broadcast in FM at 99.0 MHz in Lisbon using an authorized power of 5 W and a transmitter installed on the top of the north tower of Instituto Superior Técnico
- 2010 – Radio Futura, for Future Places Festival 2010, transmitting non-stop at 91.5 MHz, in Porto (October 12–16)
- 2011 – Radio Futura, for Future Places Festival 2011, transmitting non-stop at 102.1 MHz, in Porto (October 19–22)
- 2012 - Fourth edition of RadiaLx (June 27–30), which included a temporary broadcast in FM at 88.4 MHz in Lisbon a concert (June 29) happening simultaneously on the top of both towers of Instituto Superior Técnico

== Scientific research ==
Rádio Zero has been a case study in the development of the following scientific researches:

- COSTA, Daniel, Radia Store - Storage and Preservation of Radio Programs (dissertation for obtaining the degree of Master in Computer Engineering), Instituto Superior Técnico, Lisbon, September 2008
- ZACARIAS, Daniel, Radia Source - Information System for Process Management of a Radio Station (dissertation for obtaining the degree of Master in Computer Engineering), Instituto Superior Técnico, Lisbon, September 2008
