= Rat at Rat R =

American no wave band

- Origin: Harrisburg, Pennsylvania, Philadelphia, New York City, United States
- Genres: Noise rock Experimental; Alternative rock Noise Music No Wave
- Years active: 1981 to 1991
- Labels: Neutral Records, Sound League, Ektro Records, Tellus Audio Cassette Magazine
- Members: Victor Poison-Tete (vocals), John Myers (guitar), Sonda Andersson (bass), David Rat (drums)
- Past members: Walter Sisper

Rat at Rat R was a No Wave band formed in 1981 by guitarist Victor Poison-tete. The music of Rat at Rat R can best be described as guitar-oriented noise music or noise rock music.

== History ==
Originally hailing from Harrisburg, Pennsylvania, they initially relocated to Philadelphia, but the band soon relocated to New York City's Lower East Side to join the NYC noise rock scene, with Sonic Youth, Live Skull, and Swans, among their contemporaries. Rat at Rat R were frequent performers at CBGB’s.

Rat at Rat R has musical links to fellow Harrisburg native, the avant-garde No Wave composer Glenn Branca. Branca's cousin, Sonda Andersson played bass in Rat At Rat R until 1988 when she left to play bass in Live Skull. Andersson was replaced by Walter Sipser.

Their self-titled album Rat At Rat R was produced by Barkmarket singer/guitarist David Sardy. David Howard played drums on the 1991 release, replacing David Rat, temporarily.

Their debut album was reissued on Finland´s Ektro Records.

In 2012 the drummer David Rat moved to Argentina to get married, and later moved to Brazil. While living in Buenos Aires he recorded the album The United Hates. A documentary film was made by Ariel Pukacz, called David Rat Got Married.

== Discography ==
=== Albums ===
- Amer$ide / Rock & Roll is Dead, Long Live Rat at Rat R - (LP, Neutral, 1985)
- Stainless Steel - (12″ EP, Purge/Sound League, 1988)
- Rat at Rat R - (CD/LP, Purge/Sound League, 1991)
- Amer$ide / Rock & Roll is Dead, Long Live Rat at Rat R - (CD, Ektro Records, 2012)
