= Soundart Radio =

Dartington, Totnes, Devon, UK; England
- Frequency: 102.5

History
- First air date: 26 January 2009

Technical information
- Transmitter coordinates: 50.4509°N 3.6937°W

Links
- Website: http://www.soundartradio.org.uk

Soundart Radio is an art radio station based in Dartington, Totnes, Devon, UK. Founded as a student radio station in 2006 by two graduates of Dartington College of Arts, Nell Harrison and Lucinda Guy, the station moved onto a full-time Community Radio Licence in February 2009 broadcasting to a 5 km radius around the transmitter at Dartington Hall.

Soundart Radio is a non-profit arts organisation with membership open to all. The station provides training and workshops encouraging creative use of radio and sound.

The station is a member of Radia and defines itself as 'a place to listen, play and experiment'.
