= Dusted (Live Skull album) =

Studio album by Live Skull
- Released: 1987
- Recorded: Mid-1987
- Studios: BC, Brooklyn, NY
- Genres: Noise rock, post-punk
- Length: 36:38
- Label: Homestead
- Producer: Live Skull

Live Skull chronology
| Don't Get Any on You (1987) | Dusted (1987) | Snuffer (1988) |

Dusted is the third studio album by New York City noise rock band Live Skull, released in 1987 by Homestead Records. Thalia Zedek joined the band on vocals.

== Critical reception and accolades ==
Professional ratings
Review scores
| Source | Rating |
|---|---|
| AllMusic | 3/5 stars |
| The Philadelphia Inquirer | 4/4 stars |

Robert Palmer, in The New York Times, listed the album among the 10 best of 1987.

| Year | Publication | Country | Accolade | Rank |
|---|---|---|---|---|
| 1988 | Melody Maker | United Kingdom | "Albums of the Year" | 29 |
"*" denotes an unordered list.

== Track listing ==
All tracks are written by Live Skull.

Side 1
| No. | Title | Length |
|---|---|---|
| 1. | "Machete" | 3:45 |
| 2. | "Cavity" | 3:17 |
| 3. | "Dusted Part 2" | 2:26 |
| 4. | "Kream" | 4:13 |
| 5. | "(X) w/ the Light" | 4:14 |

Side 2
| No. | Title | Length |
|---|---|---|
| 1. | "Slugfest" | 2:12 |
| 2. | "Debbie's Headache" | 3:17 |
| 3. | "Back in the Earth" | 3:09 |
| 4. | "5-D" | 2:49 |
| 5. | "Fat of the Land" | 3:12 |
| 6. | "Dusted Drummer" | 4:06 |

CD bonus tracks
| No. | Title | Length |
|---|---|---|
| 12. | "Alive Again" | 3:50 |
| 13. | "Pusherman" (Curtis Mayfield cover) | 6:31 |

== Personnel ==
Adapted from the Dusted liner notes.

Live Skull

- Mark C. – guitar, vocals, photography
- Marnie Greenholz – bass guitar, vocals
- Richard Hutchins– drums
- James Lo – drums
- Tom Paine – guitar, vocals
- Thalia Zedek – vocals

Production and additional personnel

- Martin Bisi – mixing
- Live Skull – production, mixing

== Release history ==
| Region | Date | Label | Format | Catalog |
|---|---|---|---|---|
| United States | 1988 | Homestead | CD, CS, LP | HMS 090 |
