= M.River & T.Whid Art Associates =

MTAA (M.River & T.Whid Art Associates) is a Brooklyn, New York-based conceptual and new media art duo composed of M.River (Mike Sarff, born 1967) and T.Whid (Tim Whidden, born 1969). The two artists founded MTAA in 1996. Their often-humorous studies of networked culture, the economics of art and digital materials take the form of web sites, videos, installations, sculptures and photographic prints.

A scene from a 2008 participatory show at Light Industry

Their all-time greatest hit is the "Simple Net Art Diagram". Some of their other known web art works are "Five Small Videos About Interruption And Disappearing" and "1 Year Performance Video" commissioned by Turbulence.org. Recent participatory works include "Automatic for the People," commissioned by the San Francisco Museum of Modern Art and included in The Art of Participation: 1950 to Now; "ARTBarn," a group-assembled public building/sculpture; and "All the Holidays All at Once", presented at Aldrich Contemporary Art Museum.

Their work has been presented by institutions like The Whitney Museum of American Art, SFMOMA, The New Museum of Contemporary Art, The Getty Center and Eyebeam Atelier. International exhibitions include the Seoul Net & Film Festival in Korea and Videozone2 - The 2nd International Video Art Biennial in Israel. The collaboration has also earned grants and awards from the Creative Capital Foundation, Rhizome.org, Eyebeam Atelier, New Radio and Performing Arts and the Whitney Museum's Artport website.
