= Ron Kuivila =

American classical composer

- Born: December 19, 1955 (age 69); Boston, Massachusetts
- Occupation: Professor

Ron Kuivila (born December 19, 1955) is an American sound artist from Boston, MA. He is primarily known for his sound installations, performances, and recorded materials that make use of computers, and for his contributions to the SuperCollider audio programming language.

== Biography ==
Kuivila studied under Alvin Lucier at Wesleyan University and graduated with a B.A. in Music and a B.A. in Mathematics in 1977. He went on to receive his MFA from Mills College, studying under Robert Ashley and David Behrman. Kuivila released sound pieces as part of the Tellus Audio Cassette Magazine compilations as well as through Sonic Arts and Lovely Music. In the 1990s Kuivila and David P. Anderson were responsible for creating the software language Formula, which has been used by David Behrman. He currently teaches classes in Experimental Music, Computers in Music, and Studio Recording at Wesleyan University, where he served as the chair of the music department. Kuivila received a 2008 Foundation for Contemporary Arts Grants to Artists Award. In May 2011, he was named University Professor of Music. He currently works with the open-source software SuperCollider.

His works have been installed at the DeCordova Museum, Diapason Gallery, the San Francisco Art Institute, the Los Angeles Institute of Contemporary Art, Media Study/Buffalo, 80 Langton Street, and MoMA PS1. He has performed at The Kitchen, MoMA PS1, PASS, The Experimental Intermedia Foundation, and Bilhaud Gallery.

== Discography ==
- Linear Predictive Zoo on Tellus #22 False Phenomes, 1988
- Blurred Genres, Slowscan, Vol. 6, 1986
- Cannon Y for C.N. on Tellus #9, 1985
- Parodicals on Tellus #9, 1985
- Fidelity, Lovely Music, Ltd. LP 1722, 1985
- TI Intends... (to enforce its intellectual property rights to the fullest extent permitted by law) on Tellus #2, 1984
- Going Out with Slow Smoke, Lovely Music, Ltd. LP 1701, 1982
