= Snuffer (EP) =

EP by Live Skull
- Released: 1988
- Recorded: January 1988
- Studio: BC Studio (Brooklyn, NY)
- Genre: Noise rock, post-punk
- Length: 18:55
- Label: Caroline
- Producer: Live Skull

Live Skull chronology
Dusted (1987)	Snuffer (1988)	Positraction (1989)

Professional ratings
Review scores
Source	Rating
AllMusic	3/5 stars

Snuffer is the third EP by New York City noise rock band Live Skull, released in 1988 by Caroline Records.

== Track listing ==
All tracks are written by Live Skull.

Side 1
No.	Title	Length
1.	"Was"	2:22
2.	"Face"	3:08
3.	"Chair"	4:29

Side 2
No.	Title	Length
1.	"Step"	3:08
2.	"Word"	2:33
3.	"Straw"	3:15

== Personnel ==
Adapted from the Snuffer liner notes.

Live Skull

- Mark C. – guitar, vocals, photography
- Marnie Greenholz – bass guitar, vocals
- Richard Hutchins – drums
- Tom Paine – guitar, vocals
- Thalia Zedek – vocals

Production and additional personnel

- Martin Bisi – mixing
- Live Skull – production, mixing

== Release history ==
Region	Date	Label	Format	Catalog
United States	1988	Caroline	CS, LP	CAROL 1358
