= Lumen Eclipse =

Arts gallery located in Massachusetts

Coordinates: 42.3734°N 71.1191°W

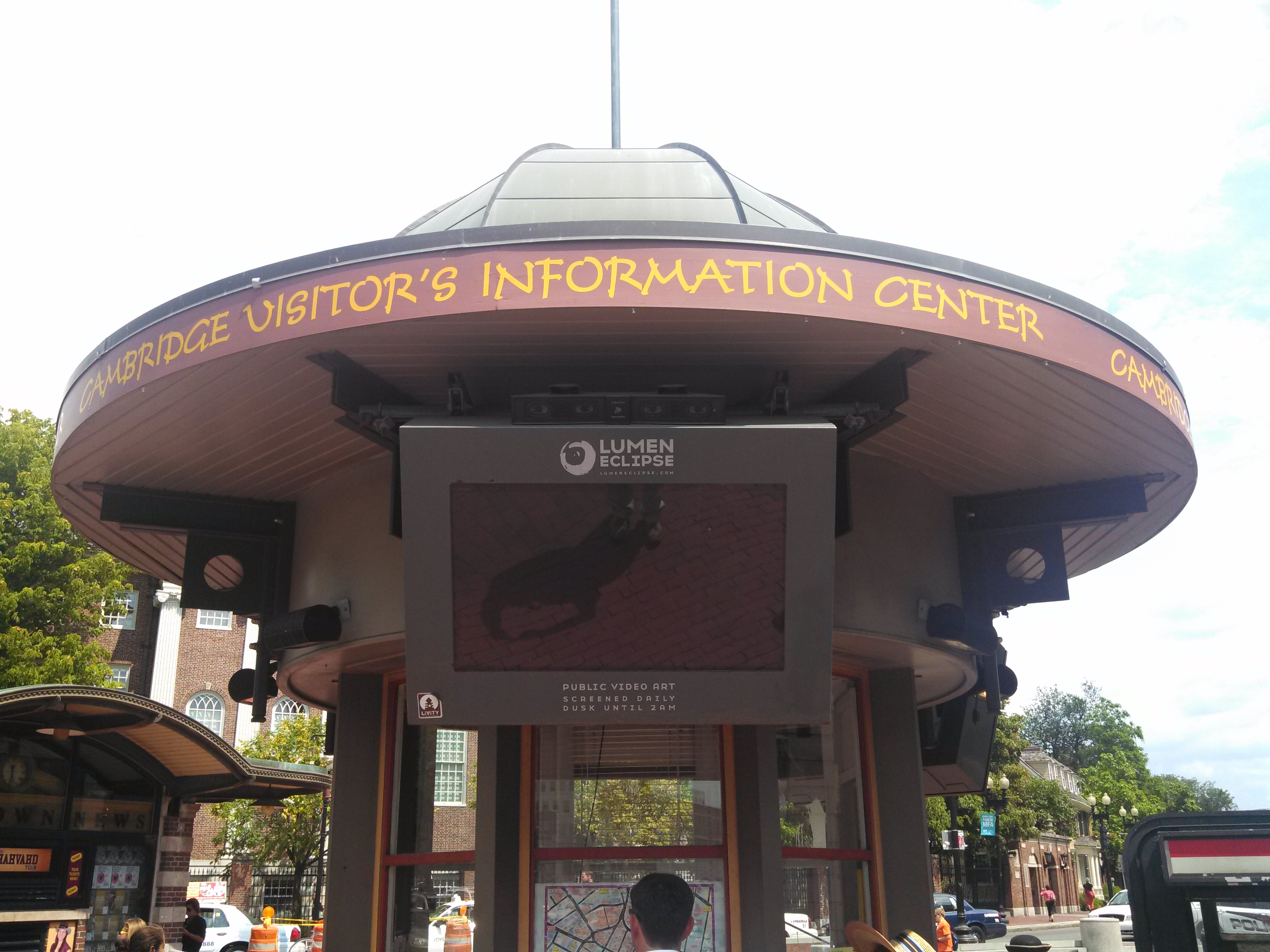
Lumen Eclipse video display in Harvard Square

Lumen Eclipse is a public media arts gallery located in Harvard Square, Cambridge, Massachusetts, founded to expand public awareness of local, national, and international artists. The gallery is situated on two mounted displays on the Tourism Information Kiosk, just outside the Harvard Square MBTA stop, screening motion art daily. The gallery may also be viewed on the Lumen Eclipse website.

== History ==
Lumen Eclipse presents contemporary motion art in public spaces, using outdoor video displays, social venues, and the web. The gallery launched November 1, 2005, in Harvard Square. Lumen Eclipse exhibits 8 works a month, representing over 300 artists since launching in 2005. Participating artists have included: Yoko Ono, Michel Gondry, Miranda July, Max Hattler and Isaac Julien.

Lumen Eclipse also hosts intimate monthly screenings to facilitate dialog between artists and audiences. The Screenings are called "Le Peek" and are held at local social venues in Cambridge MA.

== Facts ==
- In Fall 2005, curator Ryan Hovenweep asked Turbulence.org's Helen Thorington and Jo-Anne Green to recommend works for his December 2005/January 2006 exhibitions. Two Turbulence Artists' Studio works - "Tenderly Yours" by Peter Horvath, and "re_collection" by Michael Takeo Magruder - were included in the December exhibition, which was reviewed by Cate McQuaid for the Boston Globe. A Turbulence.org Commission, "Tap Evol" by Victor Liu, was shown in the January 2006 exhibition. These were the first instances of net art shown as video art in Cambridge, Massachusetts.
- Manhattan's New Museum of Contemporary Art acted as the gallery's first guest curator in February 2006.
- The gallery commissions original work on the theme of life in Cambridge, Massachusetts.
- In June 2006, the gallery's first interactive exhibit – by Massachusetts Institute of Technology’s Nell Breyer – went on display.
- Lumen Eclipse hosts Le:60 their annual 1-minute film festival on Palmer Street in Harvard Square. Le:60

== Works ==
- 57 Things to do for Free in Harvard Square is a compilation/archive of 57 videos that provide humorous yet simple things one can do for fun in Harvard Square. These "things to do" are both simple and silly and could likely be done in any urban environment. The site has a matrix structure, where any point of the site can be accessed from any other point; this form of organization allows the user to jump to any one of the 57 videos from any place on the site at any time.

== Exhibited artists of note ==
- DJ Spooky
- Miranda July
- Yoko Ono
- Tore Terrasi
- Mike Mills
- Michel Gondry
- Hexstatic
- Isaac Julien
- William Kentridge
- Janet Biggs
- Aleksandra Domanovic
- Max Hattler
- Martha Colburn
- Takeshi Murata
- Encyclopedia Pictura
