= Cloud One (album) =

Studio album by Live Skull
- Released: 1986
- Recorded: Fall 1985
- Studio: BC Studio (Brooklyn, NY)
- Genre: Noise rock, post-punk
- Length: 36:02
- Label: Homestead
- Producer: Live Skull

Live Skull chronology
Bringing Home the Bait (1985)	Cloud One (1986)	Pusherman (1986)

Professional ratings
Review scores
Source	Rating
AllMusic	3/5 stars

Cloud One is the second studio album by New York City noise rock band Live Skull, released in 1986 by Homestead Records.

== Track listing ==
All tracks are written by Live Skull.

Side 1
No.	Title	Length
1.	"Fort Belvedere"	4:13
2.	"Cloud One"	3:07
3.	"Bootcamp"	4:42
4.	"Haircut for Pigs"	2:33
5.	"Bell Shaped Heads"	3:03

Side 2
No.	Title	Length
1.	"Sylvester James"	1:02
2.	"I'll Break You"	4:05
3.	"Great Slave Lake"	4:06
4.	"Wallow in It"	4:56
5.	"The Loved One"	4:14

CD issue bonus tracks
No.	Title	Length
11.	"Pusherman"	6:42
12.	"Jerking the Light" (live)	4:25
13.	"Ranters I"	1:03
14.	"Wasp in Your Head"	5:26
15.	"Negative High" (live)	5:06
16.	"The Loved One" (live)	3:49
17.	"Ranters II"	1:11
18.	"Fort Belvedere" (live)	3:45

== Personnel ==
Adapted from the Cloud One liner notes.

Live Skull

- Mark C. – guitar, vocals, photography
- Marnie Greenholz – bass guitar, vocals
- James Lo – drums
- Tom Paine – guitar, vocals

Production and additional personnel

- Martin Bisi – mixing, recording
- Live Skull – production, mixing, recording

== Release history ==
Region	Date	Label	Format	Catalog
United States	1986	Homestead	CS, LP	HMS 056
France	2014	Desire	CD, LP	dsr085
