= Don't Get Any on You =

Live album by Live Skull
- Released: 1987
- Recorded: November 11, 1986
- Studio: CBGB's (New York City, NY)
- Genre: Noise rock, post-punk
- Length: 43:11
- Label: Homestead

Live Skull chronology
Pusherman (1986)	Don't Get Any on You (1987)	Dusted (1987)

Professional ratings
Review scores
Source	Rating
AllMusic	3/5 stars

Don't Get Any on You is a live album by New York City noise rock band Live Skull, released in 1987 by Homestead Records.

== Track listing ==
All tracks are written by Live Skull, except "Pusherman" by Curtis Mayfield.

Side 1
No.	Title	Length
1.	"Debbie's Headache"	3:29
2.	"Sparky"	4:00
3.	"Swingtime"	4:21
4.	"Loved One"	3:47
5.	"Pusherman" (Curtis Mayfield cover)	6:00

Side 2
No.	Title	Length
1.	"Skinjob"	3:23
2.	"I'll Break You"	4:08
3.	"(X) W/ The Light"	5:20
4.	"Raise the Manifestation"	4:21
5.	"Fort Belvedere"	4:22

== Personnel ==
Adapted from the Don't Get Any on You liner notes.

Live Skull

- Mark C. – guitar, vocals
- Marnie Greenholz – bass guitar, vocals
- James Lo – drums
- Tom Paine – guitar, vocals

Production and additional personnel

- Martin Bisi – mixing
- Judy Mareiniss – engineering, recording
- Keri Pickett – photography

== Release history ==
Region	Date	Label	Format	Catalog
United States	1987	Homestead	CS, LP	HMS 083
