= Positraction (album) =

Studio album by Live Skull
- Released: March 6, 1989
- Recorded: 1988
- Studio: BC Studio (Brooklyn, NY)
- Genre: Noise rock, post-punk
- Length: 32:20
- Label: Caroline
- Producer: Martin Bisi, Live Skull

Live Skull chronology
Snuffer (1988)	Positraction (1989)

Professional ratings
Review scores
Source	Rating
AllMusic	4/5 stars

Positraction is the fourth studio album released by New York City noise rock band Live Skull, released on March 6, 1989, by Caroline Records.

== Reception ==
Spin wrote, "It's a festering, appropriately black-colored slab of grinding, slash 'n' drone, East Village-trash-shit noisecluster rock. Junkies and depressants need mood music too."

== Track listing ==
All tracks are written by Live Skull.

Side 1
No.	Title	Length
1.	"Circular Saw"	2:06
2.	"Riches House"	3:39
3.	"Mr. Groove"	2:02
4.	"Hit & Sink"	2:49
5.	"Demon Rail"	3:11

Side 2
No.	Title	Length
1.	"Sunday Afternoon Whiteout"	2:32
2.	"Disengaged"	2:28
3.	"Amputease"	3:33
4.	"Safe from Me"	2:57
5.	"Caleb"	6:58

CD bonus tracks
No.	Title	Length
11.	"Paul Reveres Bush (Tree Girl)"	2:07
12.	"Was"	2:22
13.	"Face"	3:08
14.	"Chair"	4:29
15.	"Step"	3:08
16.	"Word"	2:33
17.	"Straw"	3:15

- Track 11: from Sounds and Shigaku Limited Present: Beautiful Happiness compilation
- Tracks 12–17 from Snuffer EP

== Personnel ==
Adapted from the Positraction liner notes.

Live Skull

- Sonda Andersson – bass guitar
- Mark C. – guitar
- Richard Hutchins – drums
- Tom Paine – guitar
- Thalia Zedek – vocals

Production and additional personnel

- Martin Bisi – production, engineering
- Michael Lavine – photography
- Live Skull – production

== Release history ==
Region	Date	Label	Format	Catalog
United States	1989	Caroline	CD, CS, LP	CAROL 1373
