= Marnie Jaffe =

American musician

Marnie Jaffe (née Greenholz) is an American singer/bassist. She was an early member of New York City noise-rock band Live Skull, and performed on its albums Bringing Home the Bait (1985), Cloud One (1986), Don't Get Any on You (1987) and Dusted (1987), and EPs Live Skull (1984), Pusherman (1986) and Snuffer (1988). She left the group in 1988.

As Marnie Greenholz, she appears in the 1984 Super 8 Kiki Smith/Ellen Cooper underground film Cave Girls.

Jaffe also appears with fellow Live Skull member Mark C. on the Tellus cassette compilation Tellus No. 10 All Guitars!, curated by Live Skull guitarist Tom Paine and released in 1985; the band collectively had previously appeared on the first and eighth volumes in the Tellus series.

Jaffe later moved to Cincinnati and, in 1996, formed indie-pop group the Fairmount Girls, but left the group before the 1999 release of its debut album Eleven Minutes to Anywhere.

On January 16, 2016, she participated in a Live Skull reunion at Martin Bisi's B.C. Studio, as part of the studio's semi-private, 35th anniversary "Recording of the Century" event.
