= Radio Campus Paris =

Paris; France
- Frequencies: 93.9 MHz FM (shared), DAB
- RDS: _CAMPUS_

History
- First air date: 1998

Links
- Website: radiocampusparis.org

Radio Campus Paris is a student radio station in Paris. Created in 1998 as an internet radio station, it established a half-frequency on 93.9 FM in the Paris region in 2004 that it shares with Vivre FM, maintaining their online broadcast 24 hours a day. A member of the Radio Campus France network, the station prides itself on youth culture and eclecticism, hosting around 80 different programs in the 2017–18 season.

== History ==
Radio Campus Paris was founded in 1998 with the aim of creating a new alternative media for all students in the Paris region. In 2003, the station set up its studios at the Maison des Initiatives Étudiantes, in the 3rd arrondissement, broadcasting 24/7 as a strictly web-radio station.

The Conseil supérieur de l'audiovisuel assigned a half-frequency to Radio Campus Paris on the Parisian FM band on September 23, 2004, and since then, the station emits from 5:30 pm to 5:30 am on the 93.9 FM frequency in the Paris region.

Since June 2014 Radio Campus Paris also broadcasts on digital radio on multiplex 4 in Paris.
