= Rick Prol =

Rick Prol's City of Fire invitation card for a Pyramid Club Party following an opening at the East 7th Street Gallery (mid-1980s)

Rick Prol (born 1958) is an American visual artist who came to the foray during the Neo-Expressionism, Street Art, and Graffiti art movements which first took hold in and around the East Village, Manhattan in the 1980s. The style of Prol's work can be compared to German expressionism. Art writer Anthony Haden-Guest has described Prol's works as darkly cartoony.

Prol received his B.F.A. from Cooper Union in 1980. He was a friend of Jean Michel Basquiat and helped him with his artwork in the studio. Martha Schwendener, writing in the New York Times, makes light of this and Prol's artistic output in her review of the show Circa 1985 at the Hudson Valley Center for Contemporary Art stating that "Interestingly, there are no paintings by Mr. Basquiat, who died of a drug overdose in 1988, in Circa 1986 but Mr. Prol's large canvas, I Have This Cat (1985) is an apt surrogate, complete with a primitive figure set against a bleak cityscape marked with graffitilike scrawls. In 1984 Prol's work was included in the exhibition Neo-Expressionists at The Aldrich Contemporary Art Museum in Ridgefield, Connecticut. Prol made the cover art for the first Live Skull record in 1984 produced by Massive Records.

In 2021 Prol's work was the subject of a solo show at the James Fuentes gallery. Also in 2021 Prol had a solo show in Seoul at the Leeahn gallery. In 2024 his work was included in the exhibition Urban Art Evolution at the Nassau County Museum of Art (curated by Christopher Pusey) and then in the corresponding exhibition Boyz from the Museum (curated by Loni Efron) at the Ilon Gallery in Harlem, Manhattan.
