= Jacki Apple =

American artist, writer, composer, producer and educator

Jacki Apple (1941—8 June 2022) was an American artist, writer, composer, producer and educator based in New York and Los Angeles. She worked in multiple disciplines such as performance art and installation art. As well as art making, Apple was also a writer, penning around 200 reviews and critical essays on topics such as performance art, media arts, installation art and dance. Her writing has appeared in publications such as Performing Arts Journal, Public Art Review and The Drama Review.

Apple is the winner of National Endowment for the Arts grants in 1979, 1982, 1984, and 1992 and a New York State Council on the Arts grant in 1981. In 2012, she received a Distinguished Teaching of Art Award from the College Art Association.

== Artworks ==
Jacki Apple's work deals with memory, history, and the interface between nature and culture, the relationship between matter and consciousness, and historical, biological, and geological time, as well as political and social issues. Loss, disappearances, and dislocations are often underlying themes.

The interdisciplinary performance The Amazon, The Mekong, The Missouri and the Nile (1985), a discourse on the nature of colonialism she co-conceived with choreographer Mary Jane Eisenberg and composer-musician Bruce Fowler.

Beginning in 1990, Apple explored subjects such as species extinction (The Culture of Disappearance) and natural disasters (You Don't Need A Weatherman). Archaeology, paleontology, theoretical and astrophysics, earth sciences, and the politics of culture, music and dance have been influential sources. Apple chose physicist David Bohm's Wholeness and the Implicate Order upon which to base her performance spectacle Fluctuations of the Field. Artweek's Judith Spiegel wrote that "it is nothing less than a demonstration, in the language of avant-garde performance, of the nature of reality in both its physical and social manifestations."

== Audio and radio ==
Apple worked on inserting the artist's voice into mass media as well as creating works for installations and performances. Her text/sound/music audio and radio works consist of layered intersecting textual and sonic narratives, and have been broadcast worldwide. She has approached aural space as a multi-dimensional place equivalent to three-dimensional visual space, and radio as a performance space. She creates hybrid forms—talking pictures, orchestrated texts and sonic architecture, to create a perceptual shift and transport the listener to someplace unexpected. The recording studio has been her compositional instrument, and she views producing as a compositional art form.

Works commissioned by New Radio and Performing Arts for New America Radio include the collaborative six-part radio series Redefining Democracy in America 1991–92. In Parts 1, 2, & 3: Episodes in Black and White (1991) Apple and collaborating writer/performers Linda Albertano, Keith Antar Mason, and Akilah Nayo Oliver explored issues of race, sex, money, power, drugs, family, children, violence, language and censorship, and raised questions about who speaks, who is listened to, who is heard, who is silenced. Parts 4 & 5: The Voices of America 1992 produced with KPFK-FM, Los Angeles, posed the questions "What would you say to your fellow citizens if you were running for president? What should we aspire to and how should we get there?" providing a forum for Americans across the political and cultural spectrum to speak to fellow listeners. In Part 6: A Leap of Faith (1992) with writer, performer Keith Antar Mason, a white American woman and an African-American man born in America in the middle of the twentieth century on opposite sides of the dividing line, take an imaginary journey through time.

- 1989 Swan Lake
- 1991 The Culture of Disappearance
- 1991 Voices in the Dark
- 1997 You Don't Need A Weatherman

== Discography ==
- 1978 Black Holes/Blue Sky Dreams, Airwaves, 110 Records, N.Y. LP
- 1980 The Mexican Tapes, LP, 110 Records, New York
- 1983 Idaho (Free Fire Zone) High Performance #23, Astro Artz, L.A. LP
- 1983 The Garden Planet Revisited (excerpts) Live to Air, Audio Arts, London
- 1992 Episodes in Black & White Part 1 (compilation/excerpt) SiteLess Sound Tellus #25, Harvestworks, N.Y. CD
- 1993 "Voices in the Dark” Radius # 2, Nonsequitur (record label), Albuquerque, N.M. CD
- 1995 Thank You For Flying American, Stories and songs 1980-1992, retrospective CD, Cactus/Chronic Interactive, Los Angeles
- 1995 ghost.dances\on the event horizon, CD, Cactus/Chronic Interactive, Los Angeles
- 1996 “A Leap of Faith” (excerpt) Voice Tears, The Drama Review, NYC
- 1998 You Don't Need A Weatherman (excerpt), RAS 3, Centro de Creacion Experimental Taller de Sonido, Cuenca, Spain

== Awards and recognition ==
- ZBS Foundation Residency Grant 1978
- National Endowment for the Arts Visual Arts Fellowship 1979, 1981
- NEA Museum Program project grant 1980
- New York State Council on the Arts Multimedia grant 1981
- National Endowment for the Arts Inter-Arts grant 1984, 1992
- National/State/County Partnership project grant 1987, 1989
- Santa Monica Arts Commission Grant 1989
- VESTA Award in Media Arts 1990
- Los Angeles Cultural Affairs Media Arts grant 1990
- National Endowment for the Arts Inter-Arts grant 1991–92
- California Arts Council Artists Fellowship New Genres 1996
- L.A. Dept. of Cultural Affairs, Public Arts Commissions 1997, 1999, 2000, 2001
- Art Center College of Design Faculty Enrichment Grant 2001, 2007, 2014
- Durfee Foundation Visual Arts Grant 2003, 2008
- 2012 College Art Association recipient Distinguished Teaching of Art Award
