= Aesthetic Journalism =

2009 book by Alfredo Cramerotti

Aesthetic Journalism: How to Inform Without Informing
- Aesthetic Journalism Cover Page
- Author: Alfredo Cramerotti
- Language: English
- Publisher: Intellect
- Publication date: September 2009
- Media type: Print
- Pages: 112 pp
- ISBN: 978-1-84150-268-7

Aesthetic Journalism: How to Inform Without Informing is a book by Italian writer, curator and artist Alfredo Cramerotti. Recognising the "blurring of margins between artistic and information practices" as a main feature in contemporary culture, Cramerotti sets out the Who, What, Where, When and How, and Why of Aesthetic Journalism.

Cramerotti identifies this "investigative approach" in contemporary art and photography as the use of fieldwork, reportage, interviews, document analysis, graphic mapping and information distribution. He cites a number of artists who employ these strategies: Hans Haacke, Martha Rosler, Lukas Einsele, Laura Horelli, Renzo Martens, Alfredo Jaar, Renée Green, The Atlas Group/Walid Raad and Bruno Serralogue. For Cramerotti, Aesthetic Journalism implies the critical use of documentary techniques and journalistic methods where the medium itself undergoes questioning. He posits that aesthetics, understood as a "process in which we open up our sensibility to the diversity of the forms of nature (and manmade environment)" can open up the mechanisms of art and media to expose the limitations of photojournalism, documentation and the ethics of representation. In doing so, Aesthetic Journalism renders productive readings of reality, information, fact, fiction and objectivity.

Although "the process leading up to aesthetic journalism can be considered from both perspectives as art being absorbed by the generalist media, or as journalism becoming a (common) art form", Cramerotti's text speculates on the mutual convergence of art and media into a new cross discipline of Aesthetic Journalism.

The concepts outlined in the book have been a key tool in the development of the Chamber of Public Secrets' curatorial approach for the 8th edition of Manifesta, the European Biennial of Contemporary Art: Manifesta 8 taking place in the region of Murcia, Spain.
