= Wang Li (pianist) =

Wang Li (Chinese: 王犁; born 1974) is a Chinese pianist. Born in Beijing, he began his piano studies under his father, Wang Yanqiao, a composer In China, and was accepted to study at the Central Conservatory of Music in Beijing at the age of 6. His studies later continued in Japan under Hiroko Edo, and in France at the Conservatoire national superiere de musique in Paris, under Brigitte Engerer. He went on to study in Canada at The Glenn Gould School of the Royal Conservatory of Music, where he was a student of James Anagnoson. He currently resides in Toronto, Ontario, Canada.

Wang was awarded both the 2nd prize and Best Concerto Prize at the AXA Dublin International Piano Competition in May 2003. He was also a first prize winner in Brazil's Arts Livre Competition, a Gold Medalist in the First Canadian Chopin Competition (as well as receiving a special prize for both best Mazurka and best Polonaise), a Silver Medalist in the 9th Southern Missouri International Piano Competition, 3rd prize in the 37th Maria Canals International Piano Competition in Barcelona, and a finalist at the Liszt Competition in Budapest.

His playing has been broadcast on CBC and CJRT radio, and both BRAVO! arts channel and City TV. Wang's appearances with orchestra include concertos with the Hungarian Symphony Orchestra, the Sinfonia Cultura Orchestra, and the RTÉ National Symphony Orchestra.
