= Keith Antar Mason =

American performance artist

Keith Antar Mason (born 1956) is an American writer, performance artist, and playwright. He is the founding artistic director of the Black theatrical company Hittite Empire.

== Biography ==
Mason was born on November 3, 1956, in St. Louis, Missouri. He moved to Los Angeles, California in 1985 and founded Hittite Empire in 1987.

== Selected plays and performances ==
- Prometheus on a Black Landscape: The Core (1990)
- 49 Blues Songs for a Jealous Vampire (1992)
- Performance, in LAX: The Los Angeles Exhibition (December 5, 1992)
- Busboy Blues, Atlanta & 4th St. Playhouse (1992)
- In My Living Condition, San Francisco (1992)
- Rachel Ain't Got No Brain, "Issue of Choice," LACE, Los Angeles (1992)
- River, Highways, Santa Monica, California (1992)
- Torn Language, Dialogue of Doubt (collaboration with Elia Arce and Jeff McMahon), Dance Theater Workshop, New York (1992)
- Survival (1995)

== Selected publications ==
- For Black Boys Who Have Considered Homicide When the Streets Were Too Much (1986)
- From Hip-Hop to Hittite and Other Poetic Healing Rituals for Young Black Men: A Retrospective (2005)
- New Wine & Black Men’s Feet (2009)
- Medusa's Children (2020)
