= Harvestworks =

Harvestworks is a not-for-profit arts organization located in New York City. It was founded in 1977 by artists supporting the creation and presentation of art works achieved through the use of new technologies. The Harvestworks TEAM Lab (Technology, Engineering, Art and Music) supports the creation of art works achieved through the use of new and evolving technologies.

== History ==
Founded in 1977 by Gregory Kramer and Gerald Lindahl, Harvestworks has helped many generations of artists to create new work by providing an environment for experimentation with project consultants, technicians, instructors and innovative practitioners in all branches of the electronic arts. Harvestworks has presented many experimental music concerts and is the sponsor of the Tellus Audio Cassette Magazine project. The Interactive Technology Project offers a laboratory-like setting for the development of interactive computer environments, installations and instruments that foster new modes of perception and performance.

In 2014, Harvestworks in collaboration with Vox Novus created the first 60x60 5.1 Surround Sound Mix presented by curator Hans Tammen. 60x60 presented previously only in stereo audio, this collaboration was the first mix to utilize 5.1 surround sound.

== Studio PASS ==
At the inception of Harvestworks, the Public Access Synthesizer Studio (PASS) provided access to electronic synthesizer instruments, and continues as part of Harvestworks' TEAM Lab. In 1986, the studio included “a Fairlight, a Roland Super Jupiter, an E-mu Emulator II, a Yamaha TX816 rack, Apple IIe and Macintosh computers, an Otari eight-track recorder, and a few video recorders, as well as the services of a staff engineer.” Studio PASS changed its name in the early 80s. It is now the sound studio available to independent producers, musicians and artists in residence at Harvestworks. Originally, Studio PASS was located in the Flatiron District in Manhattan at 16 west 22 St. It moved to its current home along with the rest of Harvestworks at 596 Broadway in 1987. The board of directors has included people such as Bob Moog and Suzanne Ciani.

== Major projects and events ==
Harvestworks has sponsored a number of events and projects over the years. In 1983, the Tellus Audio Cassette Magazine was created. The 5th and 6th issues of the magazine in 1984 were compiled into a double issue curated by Claudia Gould, Joseph Nechvatal and Carol Parkinson. The magazine featured Louise Lawler, Richard Prince, Perry Hoberman, David Wojnarowicz, Barbara Barg, Barbara Ess and Rhys Chatham amongst others. In 1987, Harvestworks had its first major show, the Soundwave Exhibition, curated by Gerald Lindahl and Bill and Mary Buchen and exhibited in the former City Gallery at 2 Columbus Circle. In 1992, the first usergroup for the programming language MAX was established at Harvestworks, and an exhibition called “The Interactive Show: New Audio/Video Installation Works” was presented at the Threadwaxing Space.

== New York Electronic Arts Festival ==
NYEAF (New York Electronic Arts Festival) is a biennial new media electronic arts festival produced by Harvestworks centered on Governor’s Island. It started in 2007 and has operated in multiple locations across New York City, often at the same time.
