= Radio art =

Aural art form made with sound

Radio art is an aural art form that uses radio technology (i.e. radio transmission, airwaves) to transmit sound.

== Scope ==
Radio Art contributes to new media art - a digitally driven art movement growing in response to the informative technological revolution we live in. “From the artist's point of view radio is an environment to be entered into and acted upon, a site for various cultural voices to meet, converse, and merge in. These artists cross disciplines, raid all genres and recontextualize them into hybrids.”

The radio medium can be used in ways which are different from what it was intended for. In that sense, the way the message is transmitted and received by an audience is as important as the message itself. "As an aural art form it reaffirms that it's not just what we say, but the way we say it." In Victoria Fenner's words, "Radio art is art which is specifically composed for the medium of radio and is uniquely suited to be transmitted via the airwaves."

== Themes ==
Radio art projects can be collaborative including various professional sources, unifying an audio broadcast with science, experimentation, geography, entertainment, etc." Some have approached radio as an architectural space to be constructed sonically and linguistically; or as the site of an event, an arena, or stage. Some used it as a gathering place, or a conduit, a means to create community. Other artists have employed the media landscape itself as the narrative, while others looked into the body as the site and the source; the voicebox, the larynx become medium and metaphor."

== Styles ==
Styles include radio documentary, radio drama, soundscape, sound art, electroacoustic music, sound poetry, performance, open source, translation, interviews, audio galleries, sound poetry intended for the radio, spoken word, concerts, experimental narratives, sonic geographies, pseudo documentaries, radio cinema, conceptual and multimedia performances intended for the radio.

== Art radio and webradio ==
An art radio is a radio station that would dedicate every second of its transmission time to radio art. Although this kind of project can seem utopian in the traditional state of radio, there are few lasting experiences in the underground or community side such as London's ResonanceFM, and Upstate New York's WGXC which intend to make radio with art and promote the art of listening.

Also, radio had renewed itself through the Internet. The audio streaming technique had replaced the analogue transmitting system and artists can experiment on radio outside the legal constraints of an FM license for example. Among the webradios which are dedicated to radio art, some broadcast pieces like traditional radios. Some others directly experiment with the medium in the more concrete sense. Radio Astronomy broadcast sounds taken from outer space in real time. Le Poulpe is a networking experimental radio that mix several "spaces" processed and streamed through the Internet.
