= List of comics awards =

This list of comics awards is an index to articles about notable awards for comics from around the world. The list includes awards given out for achievements in cartooning, comic books, comic strips and graphic novels. Some works in comics are also eligible for, and in some instances have won literary awards.

== American awards ==
In chronological order from date of first award presentation:

- Pulitzer Prize for Editorial Cartooning — first awarded 1922
- Reuben Award — first awarded in 1946
- Various National Cartoonists Society awards — first awarded in 1948
- Alley Award — first awarded in 1961; ceased in 1969
- Shazam Award — first awarded in 1970; ceased in 1974
- Goethe Award (later renamed "Comic Fan Art Awards") — first awarded in 1970; ceased in 1974.
- Ignatz Awards (OrlandoCon) — first awarded in 1974; ceased in 1994
- Inkpot Awards — first awarded in 1974
- Comics Buyer's Guide Fan Awards — first awarded in 1982; ceased in 2008
- Russ Manning Award — first awarded in 1982
- Jack Kirby Comics Industry Award — first awarded in 1985, ceased in 1987 (split into Harvey Award and Eisner Award)
- Harvey Awards — first awarded in 1988
- Will Eisner Comics Industry Awards — first awarded in 1988
- Compuserve Comics and Animation Forum's Don Thompson Awards (colloquially known as the "Don Thompson Awards") — first awarded in 1992; ceased in 1998
- Wizard Fan Awards — first awarded in 1993; ceased in 2006
- Lulu Awards — first awarded in 1997; ceased in 2011
- Ignatz Awards (Small Press Expo) — first awarded 1997
- Howard E. Day Prize — first awarded in 2001; ceased in 2007 (renamed the "Gene Day Award for Self-Publishing," now part of the Joe Shuster Canadian Comic Book Creator Awards)
- Day Prize/SPACE Prize (Small Press and Alternative Comics Expo)— first awarded in 2001
- Bill Finger Award — first awarded in 2005
- Glyph Comics Awards — first awarded in 2005
- Inkwell Awards — first awarded in 2008
- Ghastly Awards for Excellence in Horror Comics — first awarded 2011; ceased in 2017
- Dwayne McDuffie Award for Diversity in Comics – first awarded in 2015
- Dwayne McDuffie Award for Kids' Comics — first awarded in 2015
- Emerging Artist Prize (Cartoon Crossroads Columbus) — first awarded in 2015
- Ringo Awards (Baltimore Comic-Con) — first awarded in 2017
- Best Digital Comic (New Media Film Festival) — first awarded in 2020

=== Timeline of notable U.S. comics awards ===
The following is a timeline of notable U.S. comics awards that feature multiple categories. Awards voted on by professionals are in shades of blue; fan awards are in shades of red. (The Ignatz Award is a mixture, as the nominees are selected by professionals, but the winners are determined by the attendees of that year's Small Press Expo.)

== Australian awards ==
- Ledger Awards – first awarded in 2004
- Aurealis Award for best illustrated book or graphic novel

== Belgian awards ==
- Bronzen Adhemar – first awarded in 1977
- Prix Saint-Michel – first awarded in 1971
- Atomium comic strip prizes – first awarded in 2017

== Brazilian awards ==
- Prêmio Abril de Jornalismo, category "Comics" — first awarded in 1976; ceased in 1998.
- Prêmio Angelo Agostini – first awarded in 1985.
- Troféu HQ Mix – first awarded in 1989.
- Prêmio DB Artes — first awarded in 2003; ceased in 2010.
- Troféu Alfaiataria de Fanzines — awarded only in 2007.
- Troféu Bigorna — first awarded in 2008; ceased in 2010.
- Prêmio Claudio Seto — first awarded in 2014.
- Prêmio Al Rio — first awarded in 2015; ceased in 2018.
- Prêmio ABRAHQ — first awarded in 2016; ceased in 2017
- Prêmio Grampo — first awarded in 2016.
- Prêmio Dente de Ouro — first awarded in 2016; ceased in 2020.
- Prêmio Jabuti for Best Comic Book — first awarded in 2017.
- Prêmio LeBlanc — first awarded in 2018.
- Dia do Super-Herói Brasileiro — first awarded in 2020.
- Prêmio Odisseia de Literatura Fantástica for Best Comics — first awarded in 2021.
- Prêmio Mapinguari — first awarded in 2022.
- CCXP Awards — first awarded in 2022.

== British awards ==
- Ally Sloper Award — 1976–c. 1982
- Eagle Awards — 1977–1990; 2000–2014 (2014 as "True Believer Comic Awards")
- UK Comic Art Awards — 1990–1997
- Mel Calman Awards/Young Cartoonist of the Year Award — 1995–present
- Cartoon Art Trust Awards — 1997–2017
- National Comics Awards — 1997–1999, 2001–2003
- SICBA (Scottish Independent Comic Book Alliance Awards) — held in conjunction with the Glasgow Comic Con and first awarded 2011; still ongoing
- Excelsior Award — a single award for middle-grade comics/manga; first awarded in 2011 (as the "Stan Lee Excelsior Award"); organized by Paul Register
- British Comic Awards — 2012–2016 (in conjunction with the Thought Bubble Festival)
- The 9th Art Award — inaugural award announced 2013; sponsored by Graphic Scotland
- Comics Laureate — first awarded in 2014; sponsored by Comics Literacy Awareness
- Sophie Castille Awards — first awarded in 2023

== Canadian awards ==
- Prix Bédéis Causa – awarded to French language comics by the Festival de la BD francophone de Québec since 1988
- Bédélys Prize – awarded to French language comics since 2000
- The Doug Wright Awards – first awarded in 2005
- National Newspaper Awards of Canada include a category for Editorial Cartoonist
- Joe Shuster Awards – first awarded in 2005

== Danish awards ==
- Claus Deleuran Prisen – first awarded in 2016
- Det danske tegneseriekonvents pris – first awarded in 1989, ceased in 1995
- Hanne Hansen Prisen – first awarded in 2014, ceased in 2025
- Orla Prisen – first awarded in 2005
- Ping Prisen – first awarded in 1988 – 1996, reinstated in 2012
- Seriejournalens Netkåring – first awarded in 2001, ceased in 2008

== Dutch awards ==
- Stripschapprijs – first awarded in 1974
- Willy Vandersteenprijs – first awarded in 2010
- VPRO Debuutprijs – first awarded in 1994
- Marten Toonderprijs – first awarded in 2009

== French awards ==
- Angoulême International Comics Festival Prizes – first awarded in 1974
- Prix de la critique – first awarded in 1984

== German awards ==
- Max & Moritz Prizes – first awarded in 1984
- Rudolph-Dirks-Award – first awarded in 2016, the aim is to foster the appreciation of graphical literature as an art form; awarded in 18 categories for works and 12 categories for artists.
- Ginco Award – first awarded in 2020
- Sondermann Award – first awarded in 2004
- ICOM Independent Comic Preis – first awarded in 1994

== Greek awards ==
- Greek Comics Awards – first awarded in 2005 and known as Comicdom Awards until 2015

== Hungarian awards ==
- List of winners and nominees of Hungarian comic awards

== Irish awards ==
- The Drunken Druid Awards

== Indian awards ==
- Kalpana Lok Awards
- Indian Comics Fandom Awards
- Comic Con India Awards
- Narayan Debntah Comics Puroskar

== Italian awards ==
- Yellow Kid Award – awarded between 1970 and 2005
- Gran Guinigi Award / Pantera di Lucca Comics – first awarded in 1967
- Attilio Micheluzzi Award (Napoli Comicon prizes) – first awarded in 1998

== Japanese awards ==
- Akatsuka Award – first awarded in 1974
- Dengeki Comic Grand Prix – first awarded in 2001
- Gaiman Award – first awarded in 2011
- International Manga Award – first awarded in 2007
- Japan Cartoonists Association Award – first awarded in 1972
- Kodansha Manga Award – first awarded in 1960
- Manga Taishō – first awarded in 2008
- Tezuka Osamu Cultural Prize – first awarded in 1997
- Shogakukan Manga Award – first awarded in 1955
- Tezuka Award – first awarded in 1971

== Norwegian awards ==
- Sproing Award – first awarded in 1987

== Polish awards ==
- Grand Prix Międzynarodowego Festiwalu Komiksu – first awarded in 1991

== Portugal awards ==
- Prémios Nacionais de Banda Desenhada — First awarded in 1990
- Galardões BD Comic Con Portugal — First awarded in 2015
- Geeks d'Ouro — First awarded in 2018

== Qatar awards ==
- Arab Cartoon Award – 1st in 2012.

== Singaporean awards ==
- ComiIdol – Awarded in three categories via popular vote in 2007

== Spanish awards ==
- Barcelona International Comics Convention Prizes – first awarded in 1988
- Haxtur Awards – first awarded in 1985

== Swedish awards ==
- Adamson Awards – first awarded in 1965
- Urhunden Prizes – first awarded in 1987

== See also ==
- Lists of awards
- List of webcomic awards
- List of media awards
- List of toys and children's media awards
