= De-aging in film and television =

De-aging is a visual effects technique used to make an actor look younger

In motion pictures, whether for film (cinema), television, or streaming, de-aging is a visual effects technique used to make an actor or actress look younger, especially for flashback scenes. This is often done by digitally editing the image or using computer-generated imagery (CGI) overlays or touch-ups. Some media will even create de-aged digital actors from scratch or with a mixture of stand-ins and CGI.

== List of films ==
The following is a list of films, in chronological order of release, that employ de-aging techniques:

Year	Film	Description
2006	X-Men: The Last Stand	Actors Patrick Stewart and Ian McKellen, who play Professor X and Magneto respectively, are de-aged in a flashback scene in which the two work together to recruit Jean Grey as a student.
2006	Click	Adam Sandler, Kate Beckinsale, Henry Winkler and Julie Kavner were de-aged for flashback scenes.
2006	The Departed	Jack Nicholson was de-aged briefly in a flashback set in the early 1980s.
2008	Speed Racer	John Goodman and Susan Sarandon were de-aged for flashbacks as Pops Racer and Mom Racer respectively during Speed Racer's childhood.
2008	The Curious Case of Benjamin Button	Based on a short story in which the protagonist ages backwards, actor Brad Pitt, who plays Benjamin Button, is initially shown as elderly and is gradually de-aged to look progressively younger as numerous decades of the character's life go by.
2009	X-Men Origins: Wolverine	In this superhero film, Patrick Stewart, who plays Professor X, is de-aged for a brief cameo appearance, as the film takes place earlier in the timeline than the previous films of the series in which Stewart participated. Though Danny Huston appears as Major William Stryker in the finished film, his X2 actor Brian Cox initially expressed interest to reprise the role by employing the same CGI program applied to Stewart and Ian McKellen in The Last Stand opening sequence.
2009	Surrogates	Bruce Willis plays an FBI agent who controls a look-alike humanoid robot de-aged to appear in his mid 30s. The effect supervised by visual effects artist Mark Stetson relied on makeup, lighting, and digital effects.
2010	Tron: Legacy	A sequel to Tron (1982), set 28 years later, actor Jeff Bridges, who plays the protagonist Kevin Flynn in the original film, is de-aged to appear as Flynn's younger self in flashbacks and as the corrupt program CLU, a copy of Flynn himself, but decades younger. Rather than using footage from the original Tron as visual reference, Bridges' likeness was recreated with archive footage from Against All Odds (1984). Bruce Boxleitner, who plays the title character of Tron, also appears de-aged in flashbacks; his real world character of Alan Bradley appears as Boxleitner's natural age.
2011	Harry Potter and the Deathly Hallows – Part 2	De-aging technology was used on Alan Rickman to portray Severus Snape at the time of James' and Lily Potter's deaths at Lord Voldemort's hands.
2011	Ra.One	The film centred around a video game, where the characters, G.One and Ra.One takes physical form and enters the real world. Shah Rukh Khan plays a dual role in the film as Shekhar Subramaniam and G.One. Khan was de-aged for the part of G.One to make him look like a video game character.
2011	Hugo	Ben Kingsley was de-aged for flashback scenes of a younger Georges Méliès.
2012	21 Jump Street	Jonah Hill and Channing Tatum were digitally de-aged as their characters Morton Schmidt and Greg Jenko respectively for the film's opening sequence to depict their high school days.
2013	Curse of Chucky	Brad Dourif was de-aged with make-up, lightning and strategic camera angles to make him resemble to how he looked back when he first played Charles Lee Ray / Chucky as a human in the opening sequence of Child's Play (1988).
2013	Grudge Match	A film about Robert De Niro (Billy "The Kid" McDonnen) and Sylvester Stallone (Henry "Razor" Sharp) as boxing rivals. In the beginning of the film, both actors are de-aged to show them fighting each other in their youth/prime. The rest of the film is set several decades later.
2013	The Hobbit: The Desolation of Smaug	This film is set decades before The Lord of the Rings film trilogy (2001–2003); Orlando Bloom reprises his role as the Elf character Legolas and is de-aged in his scenes, to reflect the fact that the film's Elves do not age.
2014	Sex Tape	Cameron Diaz and Jason Segel are slightly digitally de-aged with CGI to play their characters back during their college days in the film's prologue.
2014	Kingsman: The Secret Service	Michael Caine was digitally de-aged for a scene set in 1975 featuring his character Chester King. This scene was ultimately cut from the film and has never been publicly released.
2015	Ant-Man	Michael Douglas and Martin Donovan, who play Hank Pym and Mitchell Carson, are both de-aged by 25 years, in a flashback scene set in 1989.
2015	Joy	Robert De Niro was briefly de-aged for flashbacks.
2016	Pee-wee's Big Holiday	In this comedy film, actor Paul Reubens reprises his role as Pee-wee Herman 28 years after the previous Pee-wee film. De-aging was applied to Reubens to make him appear the same age as he was in his last appearance. During filming, Reubens wore powder and tape on his face.
2016	Fan	In this Indian film, Shah Rukh Khan stars in a double role as film star Aryan Khanna and obsessive fan Gaurav Chandna, who looks like Aryan but is around twenty years younger. Khan was de-aged for the part of Gaurav with a combination of visual effects and prosthetics.
2016	Captain America: Civil War	Robert Downey Jr., who plays Tony Stark, is de-aged in a digital recreation of a pivotal moment from the character's youth. LolaVFX analyzed footage of Downey from Less than Zero (1987) as reference to achieve the youthful appearance Downey had around that period.
2016	American Pastoral	Jennifer Connelly, who plays Dawn, is de-aged to look roughly 25 years younger. LolaVFX took inspiration from her appearance in The Rocketeer (1991), focusing on the volume of her facial features.
2016	Miss Peregrine's Home for Peculiar Children	Terence Stamp, who plays Abe Portman, is de-aged in the scenes in the loop of September 3, 1943, when he was in the army.
2017	Guardians of the Galaxy Vol. 2	Kurt Russell, who plays Ego, is de-aged in a flashback scene set on Earth in 1980. Visual effects supervisor Trent Claus disclosed that director James Gunn desired to use Escape from New York (1981) as a visual reference for Russell's appearance in the film's flashback, but given how Russell's character wore an eyepatch in that film, the VFX crew could just use that film to take notes of how his skin folded and moved, ultimately choosing Russell's appearance in Used Cars (1980) as the base reference. Laura Haddock, who previously played Meredith Quill in Guardians of the Galaxy (2014), was also de-aged, albeit to a smaller degree, so she could portray a young Meredith.
2017	Pirates of the Caribbean: Dead Men Tell No Tales	In this swashbuckler, Johnny Depp, who plays the main character Captain Jack Sparrow, is de-aged for a flashback scene, with Anthony De La Torre standing in for him while wearing a digital replication of Depp's face depicting him as he looked back in 21 Jump Street (1987–1991) and What's Eating Gilbert Grape (1993).
2017	Kingsman: The Golden Circle	Colin Firth was de-aged for a flashback scene, years before the events of Kingsman: The Secret Service (2014).
2018	Ant-Man and the Wasp	Michael Douglas, Michelle Pfeiffer, and Laurence Fishburne who play Hank Pym, Janet van Dyne and Bill Foster, respectively, are de-aged in flashback sequences.
2018	Aquaman	Temuera Morrison and Nicole Kidman are de-aged through CGI, to portray Arthur Curry's parents, Thomas Curry and Atlanna, in opening scenes set during his childhood. In addition, CGI was used to de-age Willem Dafoe for the scene where Nuidis Vulko trains a young Arthur.
2019	Captain Marvel	Samuel L. Jackson and Clark Gregg, who portray Nick Fury and Phil Coulson, are de-aged by 23 years for the entire film as it is set in 1995 (but filmed in 2018), whereas the previous films in which they had appeared in these roles had all been set in the present day. In Jackson's case, according to LolaVFX supervisor Trent Claus, they watched several of Jackson's films from the 1990s to determine which ones they would use as visual reference, ultimately mainly choosing One Eight Seven (1997) and bits of Loaded Weapon 1 (1993) and Die Hard with a Vengeance (1995).
2019	Avengers: Endgame	Multiple actors were digitally de-aged for different sequences. Robert Downey Jr., Chris Evans, Chris Hemsworth, Scarlett Johansson and Jeremy Renner were digitally de-aged for their 2012 appearances that recreate scenes from The Avengers (2012) in which they respectively portray Tony Stark, Steve Rogers, Thor, Natasha Romanoff, and Clint Barton. Michael Douglas, John Slattery and Stan Lee were also digitally de-aged for their 1970s appearances, in which they respectively portray Hank Pym, Howard Stark and a car driver, the latter being Lee's final cameo role. The final cut of the film features 200 de-aging and aging shots.
2019	It Chapter Two	Horror sequel in which child actors Jaeden Martell, Jeremy Ray Taylor, Finn Wolfhard, Chosen Jacobs, Jack Dylan Grazer, Sophia Lillis, Wyatt Oleff and Jackson Robert Scott are digitally de-aged to reprise their roles from It (2017) in flashback scenes, having visibly aged in the two-year interval.
2019	Gemini Man	In this science fiction film, actor Will Smith is de-aged to portray a younger clone of his character.
2019	The Irishman	In this epic crime film, actors Robert De Niro, Al Pacino and Joe Pesci are digitally de-aged to portray younger versions of Frank Sheeran, Jimmy Hoffa and Russell Bufalino respectively.
2021	Coming 2 America	In this comedic sequel, Eddie Murphy and Arsenio Hall are de-aged in a flashback.
2021	Cruella	Emma Thompson as Baroness von Hellman, Mark Strong as John and Emily Beecham as Catherine are all de-aged for the flashback sequence of how Estella Miller / Cruella de Vil was born.
2021	Black Widow	William Hurt is de-aged as Thaddeus Ross for his scenes in the film, which take place concurrently with Captain America: Civil War (2016).
2021	Candyman	Tony Todd, reprising his role as the original Candyman, appears de-aged at the end of the film.
2021	Venom: Let There Be Carnage	Woody Harrelson and Naomie Harris are de-aged as their characters Cletus Kasady / Carnage and Frances Barrison / Shriek respectively for the opening and flashback sequences featuring their characters when they lived at Ravencroft.
2021	Spider-Man: No Way Home	Willem Dafoe and Alfred Molina reprised their roles as Norman Osborn / Green Goblin and Otto Octavius / Doctor Octopus, respectively, and were both de-aged by 19 and 17 years respectively to match their younger appearances from Spider-Man (2002) and Spider-Man 2 (2004), respectively.
2022	Scream	Skeet Ulrich reprises his role of Billy Loomis from the original Scream (1996), de-aged to appear as he did in 1996, in scenes featuring his daughter Sam Carpenter hallucinating with him due to him being her biological father.
2022	The Adam Project	In this science fiction film, actress Catherine Keener is de-aged to portray a younger version of her character.
2022	The Unbearable Weight of Massive Talent	Nicolas Cage portrays Nicky Cage, a figment of Cage's imagination, seen as a younger Wild at Heart (1990)-era version of himself.
2022	Acharya	A de-aged Chiranjeevi appears as a younger version of his character in a flashback scene.
2022	Chip 'n Dale: Rescue Rangers	A de-aged Paula Abdul appears as herself in a flashback scene.
2022	Orphan: First Kill	Isabelle Fuhrman, who portrays Esther, was de-aged with practical effects to make her appear the same age she was in the original film. The techniques used include forced perspective shots, camera angles, and makeup.
2022	Samaritan	A de-aged Sylvester Stallone appears in a flashback scene.
2022	Lifemark	Kirk Cameron and Rebecca Rogers, who play Jimmy and Susan Colton; the adoptive parents of the main character David Colton, were de-aged to make them look roughly 20 years younger to depict them at around the age that Jimmy and Susan would have been when they first adopted David in flashback scenes.
2022	Laal Singh Chaddha	In this Indian Hindi-language comedy-drama film starring Aamir Khan and directed by Advait Chandan, Shah Rukh Khan appears in a cameo appearance, playing a teenage version of himself. He was de-aged to portray the teenage version.
2022	Avatar: The Way of Water	Stephen Lang, Matt Gerald and Giovanni Ribisi are respectively de-aged to match their appearances as Miles Quaritch, Lyle Wainfleet and Parker Selfridge in Avatar (2009) for video recordings the Avatar Recombinants of the former two see that took place prior to the first film's climax. Sigourney Weaver is also de-aged to match her appearance as Dr. Grace Augustine from the original film in a dream sequence her Avatar's daughter Kiri experiences when connecting to Eywa.
2023	Scream VI	Like in Scream (2022), Skeet Ulrich reprises his role of Billy Loomis from the original Scream (1996), de-aged to appear as he did in 1996, in scenes featuring his daughter Sam Carpenter hallucinating with him due to him being her biological father.
2023	Fast X	Joaquim de Almeida is de-aged to reprise his role as Hernan Reyes for flashback sequences taking place during the events of Fast Five (2011), for which Jason Momoa is de-aged as well due to the tenth film's retconning of his character Dante Reyes, Hernan's son, in the fifth film.
2023	The Flash	Michael Shannon is de-aged for the alternate 2013 timeline created by Barry Allen / The Flash to match his appearance as Zod in Man of Steel (2013). Helen Slater and Nicolas Cage are also de-aged for the film for their respective cameos as Supergirl from the 1984 film of the same name and Superman from the unproduced film Superman Lives.
2023	Indiana Jones and the Dial of Destiny	Harrison Ford is de-aged for the film's opening sequence, which consists of a World War II flashback of Indiana Jones fighting Nazis set in 1944, for which Ford was de-aged back to how he looked during the release period of the first three Indiana Jones films to recapture the feeling that the footage was shot in the 1980s. To achieve this, Industrial Light & Magic trawled archive material of a younger Ford and matched it with freshly shot footage in addition to giving Ford the original jacket he used in Raiders of the Lost Ark (1981). Ford was "spooked" a bit with the result, but anyway impressed for its realism, yet affirmed that the technology didn't make him feel nostalgia for his youth. Impressionist Anthony Ingruber served as the character's on-set body double before Ford's likeness and voice were inserted over him through CGI. Mads Mikkelsen was also de-aged to portray his character Dr. Jürgen Voller younger, but through a different method.
2023	Mission: Impossible – Dead Reckoning Part One	Esai Morales is slightly de-aged as Gabriel for a brief flashback scene of Ethan Hunt's past where it is revealed how Gabriel murdered his wife, thus leading him to join the IMF in the first place. While Tom Cruise appears in the scene as well, his youthful appearance didn't require director Christopher McQuarrie to de-age him as well.
2024	A Legend	In this Hong Kong Chinese-language action film starring Jackie Chan and directed by Stanley Tong, He is de-aged for the film's opening sequence with younger version of his character in a flashback scene.
2024	The Greatest of All Time	Lead actor Vijay portrays a dual role in the flim in which he plays one of the role as his own son using the de-aging technology across two phases with one as a teenager aging between 15-18 and another as the main antagonist aging between 22-25.
2024	Beetlejuice Beetlejuice	In this sequel to Tim Burton's original Beetlejuice (1988) film, Michael Keaton and Monica Bellucci are de-aged for the film's flashback about the history between their characters Betelgeuse and Delores back when they briefly married during the Black Plague.
2024	Here	Tom Hanks and Robin Wright are de-aged for director Robert Zemeckis's film adaptation of Richard McGuire's comic strip "Here" (2014): «The new technology that’s being deployed on “Here” is called Metaphysics Live. The tool creates high-resolution photorealistic face-swaps and de-aging effects on top of actors’ performances live and in real-time without the need for further compositing or VFX work».
2024	Gladiator II	In this sequel to Ridley Scott's original Gladiator (2000) film, Connie Nielsen is de-aged as Lucilla for the film's flashback sequence that takes place during the first one's ending, with the likeness of a young Spencer Treat Clark (who was recast with Paul Mescal in the sequel) also being superimposed over that of Alfie Tempest as the former's character Lucius.
2024	765874 – Unification	In this Star Trek short film, William Shatner is de-aged to reprise his role as James T. Kirk, along with Sam Witwer providing the physical performance as Kirk with Shatner's likeness superimposed, opposite a digital recreation of Leonard Nimoy as Spock, with the approval of Shatner and Susan Nimoy,
2025	Ma mère, Dieu et Sylvie Vartan	For a cameo taking place in the 1970s, singer Sylvie Vartan is de-aged from 80 to her 20s, appearing interviewed by the main character, both journalist and a fan.
2025	Le Routard	Christian Clavier is de-aged for a flashback showing, in the 1970s, the job interview of his character at the beginning of his career in a travel guide. His appearance matches his look from his first movies in that decade. Young actor Martin Jouve served as the character's on-set body double before Clavier's likeness and voice were inserted over him through AI CGI.
2025	Ballerina	Gabriel Byrne, Ian McShane and Anjelica Huston are de-aged as the Chancellor, Winston Scott and the Director respectively for the film's opening sequence before the main plot.
2025	F1	Brad Pitt is de-aged as Sonny Hayes in some of the film's flashback sequences.
2025	I Know What You Did Last Summer	Sarah Michelle Gellar is de-aged as Helen Shivers in Danica's nightmare sequence.

== List of television series ==
The following is a list of television series, in chronological order of release, that employ de-aging techniques:

Year	Television series	Description
2009	CSI: Miami	For the eighth season premiere episode "Out of Time", David Caruso's character, Horatio Caine, was made to look twelve years younger in the flashback sequences which take place in 1997.
2009	CSI: NY	For the sixth season episode "Blacklist", Gary Sinise was de-aged for a flashback set in the early 1990s.
2016	Westworld	In the first season episode "The Stray", Anthony Hopkins was de-aged to appear as a younger Dr. Robert Ford in a flashback. Visual effects supervisor Jay Worth stated to figure out how they wanted Hopkins to look like with photography and references, for which they used all movies and photos the actor appeared in before his breakthrough role as Hannibal Lecter in The Silence of the Lambs (1991), Important Looking Pirates took a scan of Hopkins and produced a photorealistic CG version of the thespian that was placed on a stand-in's body.
2017	Twin Peaks	In the third season episode "Part 17", Sheryl Lee was digitally de-aged through a combination of lightning and CGI to appear as a youthful Laura Palmer when Agent Dale Cooper time travels back to the past to save her.
2021	WandaVision	In the episode "Previously On", Kathryn Hahn is digitally de-aged for the opening flashback sequence revealing her character Agatha Harkness' origin story that takes place in 1693's Salem, Massachusetts.
2022	Star Trek: Picard	At the end of the second-season premiere, John de Lancie appears as Q did in Star Trek: The Next Generation (1987–1994) for a few moments, before the character uses his powers to instantly age his physical appearance (reflecting de Lancie's current age) to match Patrick Stewart, who is playing an elderly Jean-Luc Picard. In addition, Stewart and Jonathan Frakes (playing William Riker) were de-aged for several flashback sequences set in the years between TNG's events and the series' present, shown throughout the third season.
2022	Obi-Wan Kenobi	In the episode "Part V", both Ewan McGregor and Hayden Christensen are de-aged 20 to 17 years to match their appearances as Obi-Wan Kenobi and Anakin Skywalker respectively from Star Wars: Episode II – Attack of the Clones (2002) and Star Wars: Episode III – Revenge of the Sith (2005) in flashback scenes which take place during the timeframe of the Star Wars prequel trilogy.
2022	Better Call Saul	While de-aging was not employed for most of the show for characters like Giancarlo Esposito's Gus Fring or Jonathan Banks' Mike Ehrmantraut, episode writer/director Thomas Schnauz confirmed that in the sixth season episode "Breaking Bad", some de-aging was used to erase some lines from the faces of Bryan Cranston and Aaron Paul to enable them to reprise their roles as Walter White and Jesse Pinkman for scenes that take place during the timeframe of the Breaking Bad second season episode "Better Call Saul".
2022	Cobra Kai	In the fifth season episode "Ouroboros", William Zabka is de-aged with the use of a body double to match Zabka's appearance as a younger Johnny Lawrence in The Karate Kid (1984).
2022–2023	The Time Hotel	In this series of fictionalized interviews with dead celebrities, the TV host Thierry Ardisson is de-aged through Mac Guff's FaceRetriever deepfake technology to match his appearance of the late 1990s, era of his talk show Tout le monde en parle.
2022–2023	Willow	For some flashbacks sequences in the series premiere "The Gales" and its second episode "The High Aldwin", Warwick Davis and Joanne Whalley are de-aged to match their appearances as Willow Ufgood and Queen Sorsha in Willow (1988).
2023	Kaleidoscope	In the episode "Violet: 24 Years Before the Heist", Giancarlo Esposito and Rufus Sewell are de-aged to appear as they did 24 years earlier from 2022, in 1998.
2023	Secret Invasion	In the episodes "Promises", "Betrayed" and "Beloved", Samuel L. Jackson and Charlayne Woodard were de-aged respectively to portray younger versions from Nick Fury and Varra / Priscilla Davis during scenes set in 1997, 1998 and 2012.
2023	Ahsoka	In the episodes "Part Four: Fallen Jedi", "Part Five: Shadow Warrior", "Part Seven: Dreams and Madness" and "Part Eight: The Jedi, the Witch and the Warlord", much like in Obi-Wan Kenobi, Hayden Christensen gets de-aged to match his appearance as Anakin Skywalker in Star Wars: Episode III – Revenge of the Sith (2005), such as in the scenes where he meets again with his Padawan Ahsoka Tano in the World Between Worlds, transporting her to scenarios they had during Clone Wars, where Ahsoka is played by Ariana Greenblatt rather than Rosario Dawson.
2024	A Man on the Inside	In the opening scene of the episode "Tinker Tailor Older Spy", Ted Danson is de-aged to match his appearance in the 1980s and 1990s, based on his appearance in Cheers (1982–1993).
2025	Andor	For the second season episode "Make It Stop", Stellan Skarsgård is subtly de-aged as a younger Luthen Rael for Kleya Marki's origin story, which is told throughout the episode's flashback storyline. Light with no make-up was employed for the effect, with Skarsgård making sure his eyes were visible during all of his shots.
2025	Stranger Things	For the fifth season of the show, de-aging is used to give the impression that the younger cast has not aged since the release of the fourth season, as filming on the fifth season delayed thanks to the 2023 SAG-AFTRA strike; producer Shawn Levy has stated that the de-aging used for the actors may involve make-up and costumes, but not the use of artificial intelligence.

== Virtual actors in motion pictures ==
In some cases, a young version of a character is not played by the original actor but by a virtual actor, even though the actor being represented is usually still alive. This is usually accomplished with some combination of CGI, a body double, and a voice double or archival audio. Examples of actors who were replaced by virtual actors to portray their younger selves include:

=== List of films ===
Year	Actor	Film	Description
2009	Arnold Schwarzenegger	Terminator Salvation	The likeness of a younger Schwarzenegger as the T-800 from The Terminator (1984) is virtually recreated, with Roland Kickinger serving as the body double.
2015	Arnold Schwarzenegger	Terminator Genisys	For a scene which depicts the same T-800 from The Terminator, Brett Azar served as body double for Schwarzenegger's 1984 likeness.
2015	Louis de Funès	Animal Kingdom: Let's Go Ape	In this animated motion capture film, the character of Vladimir is inspired by the late comic actor, the animators having used images from his films as reference. The model is then applied to the face and gestures of the impersonator Patrice Thibaud. His voice is recreated through archival radio records via an early voice cloning technology developed by IRCAM, merged with the vocal performance of Thibaud.
2016	Peter Cushing	Rogue One: A Star Wars Story	Cushing's portrayal of Grand Moff Tarkin from Star Wars (1977) is digitally recreated, with Guy Henry serving as both the body and voice double.
2016	Carrie Fisher	Rogue One: A Star Wars Story	In the film's closing scene, Fisher's 1977 likeness as Princess Leia from Star Wars (1977) is digitally recreated, with Ingvild Deila serving as body double and archive audio of Fisher's voice (taken from outtakes of her hologram scene in Star Wars), being used.
2017	Sean Young	Blade Runner 2049	Young's portrayal of Rachael from Blade Runner (1982) is recreated in the scene where a clone of the replicant is created by Niander Wallace and offered to Rick Deckard in an (ultimately rejected) exchange for information. Young's likeness was digitally superimposed onto Loren Peta, who studied Young's performance from the first film to recreate her voice and movements.
2019	Arnold Schwarzenegger	Terminator: Dark Fate	Although all but Furlong appeared in the film as their current ages, virtual actors were used for their characters Terminator, Sarah Connor and John Connor in flashback scenes. Brett Azar, Maddy Curley and Jude Collie served as the three characters' body doubles, respectively.
2019	Linda Hamilton	Terminator: Dark Fate	Although all but Furlong appeared in the film as their current ages, virtual actors were used for their characters Terminator, Sarah Connor and John Connor in flashback scenes. Brett Azar, Maddy Curley and Jude Collie served as the three characters' body doubles, respectively.
2019	Edward Furlong	Terminator: Dark Fate	Although all but Furlong appeared in the film as their current ages, virtual actors were used for their characters Terminator, Sarah Connor and John Connor in flashback scenes. Brett Azar, Maddy Curley and Jude Collie served as the three characters' body doubles, respectively.
2019	Mark Hamill	Star Wars: The Rise of Skywalker	For a brief flashback sequence in this epic space opera film, a young Fisher and Hamill's likenesses as Princess Leia and Luke Skywalker from following Return of the Jedi (1983) are digitally recreated using archival footage – Fisher's daughter Billie Lourd served as body double for her, while Lukaz Leong served as body double for Hamill.
2019	Carrie Fisher	Star Wars: The Rise of Skywalker	For a brief flashback sequence in this epic space opera film, a young Fisher and Hamill's likenesses as Princess Leia and Luke Skywalker from following Return of the Jedi (1983) are digitally recreated using archival footage – Fisher's daughter Billie Lourd served as body double for her, while Lukaz Leong served as body double for Hamill.
2021	Harold Ramis	Ghostbusters: Afterlife	Bob Gunton and producer Ivan Reitman portrayed the living and ghostly versions of Egon Spengler respectively through the use of prosthetics and digital makeup, digitally recreating the likeness of Ramis from Ghostbusters (1984) and Ghostbusters II (1989).
2024	Ian Holm	Alien: Romulus	A character named Rook had the same model as Ash from Alien (1979), with a torso based on a headscan Ian Holm had made for his role of Bilbo Baggins during production of The Lord of the Rings film trilogy (2001–2003). An animatronic was created and actor Daniel Betts provided motion capture and voiceover (enhanced by artificial intelligence) for the character. Holm's likeness from Alien was later applied to the performance.

=== List of television series ===
Year	Actor	Series	Season	Episode	Description
2013	John Hurt	Doctor Who	2013 specials	"The Night of the Doctor"	In the mini-episode, the dying Eighth Doctor (Paul McGann) regenerates into the War Doctor, played by an elderly John Hurt in "The Day of the Doctor". Since regeneration is supposed to rejuvenate the Doctor, the War Doctor is only glimpsed at the very end, in a reflection where McGann's face was replaced with a still image of a younger Hurt's, taken from a photo of him playing Rodion Raskolnikov in the 1979 BBC adaptation of Crime and Punishment.
2020	Mark Hamill	The Mandalorian	Season 2	"Chapter 16: The Rescue"	In "Chapter 16: The Rescue", the sixteenth episode of The Mandalorian (2019–present), a young Mark Hamill's likeness as Luke Skywalker from the decade following Return of the Jedi (1983) is digitally recreated; Max Lloyd Jones served as body double, while Hamill's younger voice was recreated using speech synthesis through machine learning.
2021	Mark Hamill	The Book of Boba Fett		"Chapter 6: From the Desert Comes a Stranger"	In "Chapter 6: From the Desert Comes a Stranger", the sixth episode of The Book of Boba Fett (2021–2022), Hamill's likeness as Skywalker is recreated again; Graham Hamilton was the on-set performer for the character. Skywalker was largely created through visual effects and synthesized speech based on reference images and recordings, respectively, of Hamill.
2022	Millie Bobby Brown	Stranger Things	Season 4		In the fourth season of Stranger Things (2016–present), a younger pre–Stranger Things Millie Bobby Brown as Eleven / Jane Hopper ("El") was digitally recreated, with Martie Blair serving as her body double. Blair stood-in for the 9-year-old version of Eleven, with her face digitally replaced with Brown's own in post-production.
2022–2023	Various celebrities	The Time Hotel		3 episodes	In this series of fictionalized interviews with dead celebrities, singer Dalida, comedians Coluche and Jean Gabin, president François Mitterrand and princess Diana are recreated via Mac Guff's FaceRetriever deepfake technology, their likeness applied on body doubles. Through Mac Guff's Talking Pictures, another deepfake technology, singer Claude François, actors Thierry Le Luron, Louis de Funès, Marlene Dietrich, Michèle Morgan, Steve McQueen, Audrey Hepburn, music producer Eddie Barclay, the Abbé Pierre, journalist Philippe Gildas, film producer Claude Berri, writer Michel Audiard and emperor Napoleon are also digitally recreated, with only their faces appearing on a screen or in moving frames. The voice of Dalida is recreated using the voice cloning technology, based on archival records, developed by IRCAM. The others voices are performed by impressionists.
