= Proprietary House =

Historic house in New Jersey, United States

- The Proprietary House
- U.S. National Register of Historic Places
- New Jersey Register of Historic Places
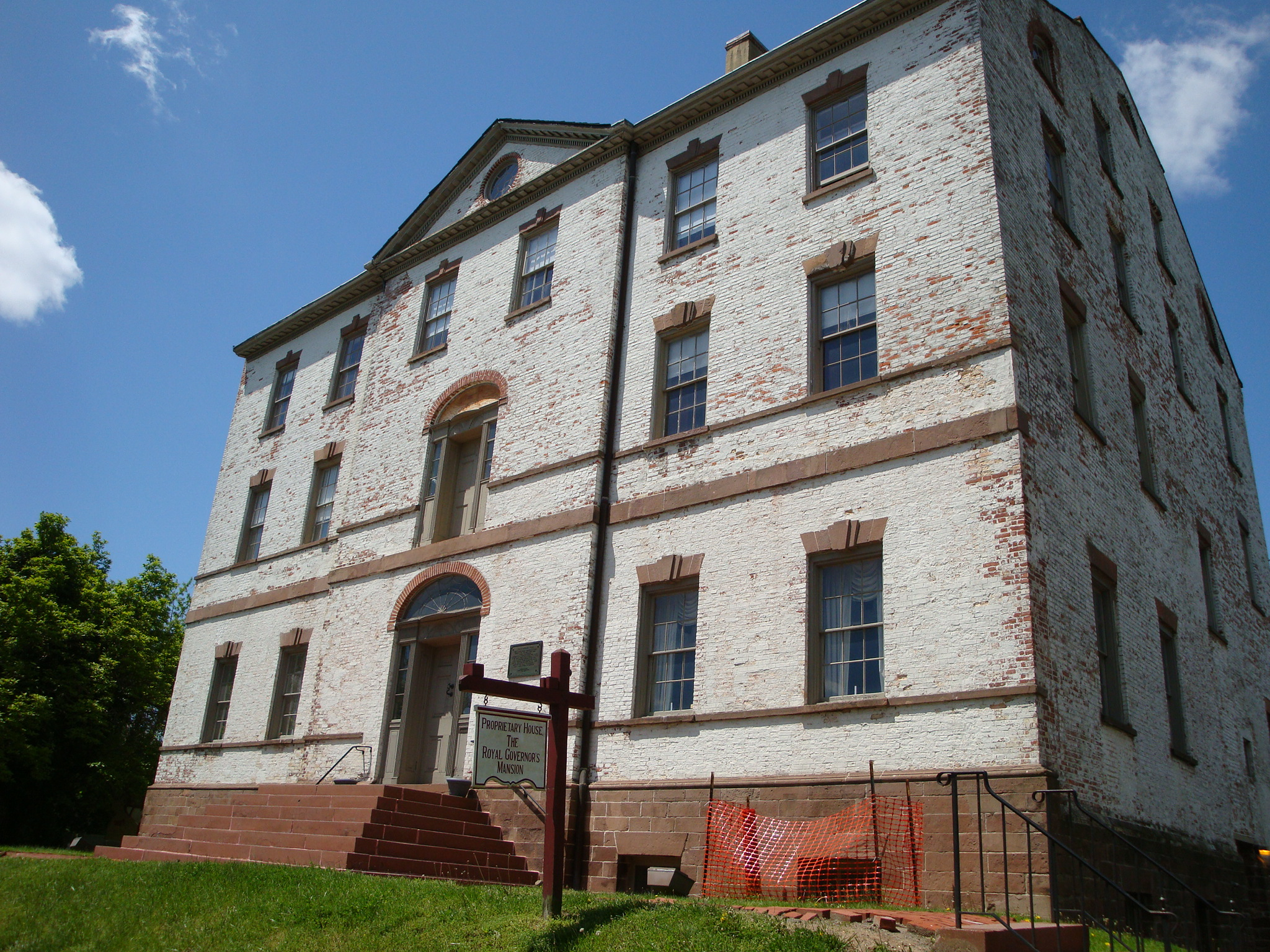
- Proprietary House in 2009

- Location within Middlesex County, New Jersey
- Location: 149 Kearny Ave; Perth Amboy, NJ 08861
- Nearest city: Edison, New Jersey, U.S.
- Coordinates: 40°30′13″N 74°16′09″W
- Area: 0.6 acres (0.0024 km^{2})
- Built: 1762
- Built by: John Edward Pryor
- Architect: John Edward Pryor
- Architectural style: Georgian
- Restored: began in 1985
- Restored by: The Proprietary House Association
- NRHP reference No.: 71000509
- NJRHP No.: 1900

Significant dates
- Designated: February 24, 1971
- Designated NJRHP: September 11, 1970

Proprietary House in Perth Amboy, New Jersey, United States, is a historic proprietary governor's mansion, the only one from the original Thirteen Colonies still standing. Overseen by architect and builder John Edward Pryor, construction began in 1762 and was completed in 1764.

The Georgian style "mansion" was first occupied by Chief Justice Frederick Smyth by rent and approval of "The Proprietors" on April 10, 1766, to 1773. In May 1773, the mansion was repaired and fitted to be the residence of the royal governor of New Jersey, and leased by the proprietors as such.

== History ==
=== 18th century ===
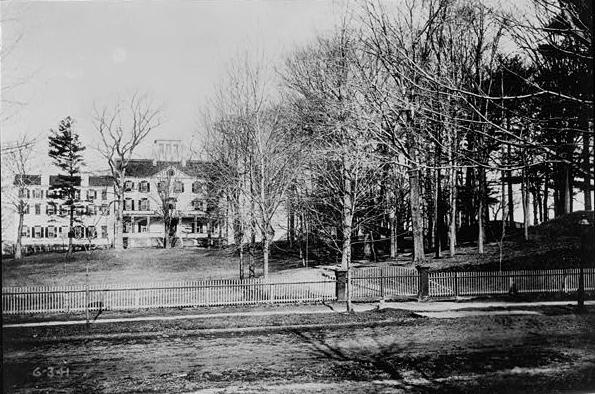
In the late 19th century, Proprietary House was The Brighton, a luxury hotel at the time

The home was occupied temporarily, 1774 to 1776, by the Royal Governor of New Jersey, William Franklin, the illegitimate son of Benjamin Franklin.

==== American Revolution ====
In January 1776, he was ordered to be held under house arrest on order of the Provincial Congress of New Jersey and under guard of the Committee of Safety. In June 1776, after the onset of hostilities between Great Britain and the fledgling nation, he was ordered arrested and taken to Princeton for trial and then imprisoned in Litchfield, Connecticut until his release in a prisoner exchange in 1778.

Either during or after the American Revolutionary War, the House suffered extensive damage. A fire gutted the interior. (Note: In the graphic novel Here, author Richard McGuire shows the house burning in the year 1783.) On February 29, 1792, an ad in the New Jersey Journal and Political Intelligencer stated "to be sold ... eleven acres of land ... the property of the proprietors of East New Jersey.... The remains of the house lately burned, will be nearly sufficient for a new building."

The property was not sold until John Rattoon, later to become mayor of Perth Amboy, New Jersey, purchased it for $1,051 in 1794. (Rattoon, a Perth Amboy merchant, had carefully concealed his work as a spy for the British during the war.) He tore down the damaged rear portion of the upper story, put on a roof, and refurbished the interior.

=== 19th century ===
==== The Brighton Hotel ====
In 1808, Rattoon sold the property to Richard M. Woodhull of New York City, who converted it into a hotel called The Brighton.

In addition to building a three-story wing, Woodhull added two stories to the main block. The smaller lintels of the third-floor windows indicate the change. (During the 1986 restoration, the attic chimneys revealed that the original roof had been only about eight feet lower than the present one.) Woodhull replaced the huge front door, the outline of which is still distinguishable in the brick pattern. The massive brownstone steps were replaced with a two-story porch. A door leading to the second story of the porch replaced the Venetian window. Almost all of the present woodwork dates from the 1808–1809 period. It was then that the two handsome interior arches were constructed.

On May 27, 1809, the New-York Gazette described The Brighton Hotel as a "charming place, magnificent by nature and elegant by art."

The Brighton briefly flourished until the War of 1812 brought an end to tourism and the lifeblood of the hotel.

==== The Bruen House ====
In 1817, it was sold at sheriff's sale to Matthias Bruen, a Perth Amboy merchant who had become one of the wealthiest men in the nation. He resided there until his death in 1846; his descendants made large contributions to America's social and political history.

The Bruen heirs renovated the property and renamed it as The Brighton. It was adapted again as a hotel, but with modest accommodations.

Interruptions caused by the Mexican-American (1846–1848) and Civil Wars (1861–1865), however, doomed the project.

==== The Westminster ====
In subsequent years, the original 11.5-acre site was subdivided. In 1883, the Bruen family conveyed the property to the Presbyterian Board of Relief for Disabled Ministers and the Wives and Orphans of Deceased Ministers, where it was used as a home for the families of deceased ministers. After 20 years, the Presbytery returned the property to the Bruen family.

=== 20th century ===
In 1904, the family sold the property. Most of its eleven acres were divided into building lots, and Kearny Avenue was cut through. The house experienced a series of owners. Over the years, it changed from a comfortable apartment house with a public restaurant to a rooming house.

=== 21st century ===
Now owned by the State of New Jersey, a portion of the building is operated as a museum by the Proprietary House Association. The upper floors of the original building and the 1809 wing are occupied by professional offices.

The first floor and basement of the Proprietary House have been undergoing extensive repairs and restoration by the non-profit Proprietary House Association. The New Jersey Historic Trust and the Division of Parks and Forestry of the New Jersey Department of Environmental Protection, along with private contributors, have greatly supported the effort to restore some of the former glory of the building.

== Restoration ==
In 1914, a group of Perth Amboy citizens founded the Westminster Historical Society to raise funds to purchase and restore the Proprietary House. In the late 1930s, the house was measured and plans drawn by the Historical American Building Survey for a record of this significant property. The plans and photos are held by the Library of Congress in Washington, D.C.

Realizing that the importance of the property was as the Proprietary House and not as the Westminster, the Proprietary House Association was incorporated on September 7, 1966, to succeed the Westminster Historical Society. The state was persuaded to purchase the property, and it was placed on both the State and National Registers of Historic Places.

Mainly with volunteer help, the association cleaned out years of accumulated debris and removed walls that had divided the great rooms. The first two floors were open to visitors in 1976. Gradually, it became recognized that the Proprietary House is of state and national as well as local significance. However, the process of decay continually outpaced the process of restoration. Neither the association or the state were able to pay for historically accurate restoration.

In 1985, the Restoration Partnership of Boston, with William S. Pavlovsky as a principal, proposed a plan under which the partnership would lease the house and 3.5 acres of surrounding land for 25 years. At its cost, the Partnership would restore and renovate the exterior, and finish the interior of the 1809 wing and the upper floors of the main block as offices. Income from the offices would reimburse the partnership. The plan was implemented in 1986. The ground and first floors of the original mansion are leased by the State to the Proprietary House Association, which is charged with raising funds for programming, interpretation, and historically accurate restoration.

In late 2011, a historically accurate re-restoration began. Through paint analysis each room on the first floor and basement levels depicted a colorful timeline of its many past occupants. The color of the rooms could be seen and experienced as they were through the eyes of those viewing them in their era. This museum is a hands-on introduction to the events and people that helped shape this nation's history.

Throughout these phases, the house/museum is always open for tours, events, and exhibits.

== In popular culture ==
The Richard McGuire graphic novel Here is set on the grounds of the Proprietary House, primarily in a family home built on one of the land lots sold in 1904. A flashback sequence briefly depicts the political conflict between Benjamin Franklin and his son William.

== See also ==
- List of colonial governors of New Jersey#Governors of New Jersey only (1738–1776)
- List of the oldest buildings in New Jersey
- National Register of Historic Places listings in Middlesex County, New Jersey
- Perth Amboy City Hall
- Proprietary colony
- Proprietary governor
