= Jingfen =

Jingfen may refer to:

- Empress Dowager Longyu (1868–1913), personal name Jingfen
- Jingfen, a Chinese buzzword created by fans of the webcomic Finnish Nightmares
