= List of winners and nominees of Hungarian comic awards =

This article is a list of winners and nominees of regular Hungarian comic awards, sorted by awards, followed by category.

== Alfabéta Awards ==
Note: the years listed in the following tables marks the year the prize was awarded, the related comics were made in the preceding year.

=== Best Comic ===
(At least 20 pages long.)

==== Winners ====
Year	Translated title	Original title	Artist	Script	Publication title	Publisher
2006	The Haven #1 - The Caller	A Rév: A hívó	Róbert Odegnál	Róbert Odegnál	same as title	Vad virágok könyvműhely
2007	The Bureaucrats	Bürokraták	Brazil (Szabolcs Tebeli)	Balázs Oroszlány, Áron Németh	Roham magazin	Roham
2008	The Gemini file - 1. - Hunting twins	A Gemini-jelentés 1: Ikervadászat	Attila Fazekas	Péter Korcsmáros (based on his novel Antal Bayer)	A Gemini-jelentés 1: Ikervadászat	Képes kiadó
2009	Stroboscopa	Stroboscopa	Iván Kemenes	Iván Kemenes, Péter Varga	Stroboscopa	Self-published
2010	Pestblog.hu	Pestblog.hu	Zsolt Ács	Barnabás Ábrai, Csaba Mikó	Pestblog.hu	Roham
2011	Ágoston, the nuclear poultry	Ágoston, nukleáris baromfi	Róbert Vass	Róbert Vass	same as title	Nero Blanco Comix
2012	Irreversible	Irreverzibilis	Levente Szabó	Levente Szabó		Képes Kiadó
2013	Locke Key Clan	Slusszkulcs Klán	Márton Hegedűs	Márton Hegedűs		Libri
2014	The Fruit of Labor	A munka gyümölcse	Gábor Molnár	Ádám Pádár		5Panels
2015	The Stolen Courier	Az ellopott futár	Zsolt Garisa	Jenő Rejtő, Ferenc Kiss, Zsolt Garisa		Ninth.hu
2016	5Pallos, Part 1	5Pallos, 1. rész	Gábor Molnár	Gábor Molnár		5Panels/EpicLine
2017	Kittenberger I: Fabriqué en Belgique	Kittenberger I.: Fabriqué en Belgique	Szabolcs Tebeli	György Somogyi, István Dobó		OneWay Media
2018	West+Zombies	Nyugat+Zombik	Oliver Csepella	Oliver Csepella		Corvina
2019	New new comics	Új új képregények	Zoltán Koska	Zoltán Koska		
2020	Water fairy	Vízitündér	Anna Júlia Benczédi	Maria Surducan		Illustrart
2021	The big Csé	A nagy Csé	Zoltán Koska	Zoltán Koska		Fiction Observer
2022	Kittenberger III - At Hell's Gate	Kittenberger III. - A pokol kapujában	Szabolcs Tebeli	György Somogyi, István Dobó		OneWay Media
2023	It's a long way home	Hosszú az út hazáig	Brazil/Szabolcs Tebeli	Mervorious		Képes Krónikák
2024	Stories of the Thousand Heads – First: The Hunter	Az Ezerfejű Történetei – Első: A vadász	Márta Gyuricza	Viktória Rédei		
2025	Hungarian Rock History '80-'90	Magyar Rocktörténet '80-'90	Péter Haragos, Miklós Felvidéki	Mihály Kántor		Képes Krónikák
2026	No dizzying height	Semmi szédítő magasság	Kuizs Lilla	Kuizs Lilla		

==== Nominees ====
Year	Translated title	Original title	Artist	Script	Publication title	Publisher
2006	Kalyber Joe #1 - The Beginning	Kalyber Joe 1: A kezdet	Roland Pilcz	Roland Pilcz	same as title	Factory
2006	Captain Perseus Returns	Perszeusz kapitány visszatér	Attila Fazekas	Attila Fazekas	Füles	
2007	Flame Tempest 1956	Tűzvihar 1956	Attila Fazekas	Mór Bán	same as title	Képes kiadó
2007	Kalyber Joe #2 - Rain	Kalyber Joe 2: Eső	Roland Pilcz	Roland Pilcz	same as title	Factory
2008	Tinglitangó	Tinglitangó	Mihály Vass	Mihály Vass	same as title	Képes kiadó
2008	Just an average Monday	Csak egy átlagos hétfő	Imre Fekete	Imre Fekete	Kretén	Adoc-Semic
2008	Kulo City	Kulo City	Attila Stark	Attila Stark	same as title	Roham
2009	Spiral	Spirál	Attila Futaki	Gergely Nikolényi, Attila Futaki	same as title	Athaneum
2009	A Boy named Sue	A fiú, akit Zsuzsinak hívtak	Miklós Felvidéki	Miklós Felvidéki	same as title	Képes kiadó
2009	Navigator Johnny Fellow #0	Johnny Fellow Navigátor #0	Brazil (Szabolcs Tebeli)	Brazil (Szabolcs Tebeli)	same as title	Roham
2010	12 hours	12 óra	Zsolt Ács	Zsolt Ács	Zap	Roham
2010	The Ditch of Babel	Bábel verme	Iván Kemenes	Iván Kemenes, Péter Varga	same as title	Roham
2010	Kalyber Joe #4-5 - Angels in Hell	Kalyber Joe 4-5: Angyalok a pokolban	Roland Pilcz	Roland Pilcz	same as title	Factory
2011	Deveraux 1-2	Deveraux 1-2	Imre Papp	Imre Papp	same as title	by artist
2011	Coldpeace	Hidegbéke	Zsolt Kuczora	Zsolt Kuczora	same as title	by artist
2011	Kalyber Joe #6 - Shadows	Kalyber Joe 6: Árnyak	Roland Pilcz	Roland Pilcz	same as title	Kingpin
2011	Lencsilány	Lencsilány	István Lakatos	István Lakatos	same as title	Nyitott könyvműhely

=== Best Short Story ===
(Between 3 and 19 pages)

==== Winners ====
Year	Translated title	Original title	Artist	Script	Publication title	Publisher
2006	The Sphere	A gömb	Imre Fekete	Ferenc Hauck	Fekete-Fehér Képregényantológia 2	Míves céh
2007	Sunday Safari	Vasárnapi szafari	Richárd Vass	Richárd Vass	Galaktika	
2008	Overtime in the Parliament	Parlamenti túlóra	Jenő Szabó	Tamás Gáspár	Kép, regény szabadság	
2009	Miserere homine	Miserere homine	István Lakatos	István Lakatos	Műút	Műút
2010	Sunday	Vasárnap	István Lakatos	István Lakatos	Pinkhell 6.	MKA
2011	Korhelyhajhászat	Korhelyhajhászat	Zoltán Fritz	Zoltán Fritz	Pinkhell 7.	MKA
2012	Jazz	Jazz	Artúr Haránt	Artúr Haránt, Péter Árva-Szabó	Papírmozi Iss. 4	
2013	Dániel Csordás' comic blog	Csordás Dániel képregényblogja				
2014	The Adventures of Szekerce and Szemerce, Part 1	Szekerce és Szemerce kalandjai, 1. rész	Gábor Molnár	Gábor Molnár	EpicLine Iss. 2	
2015	The Line	A vonal	Áron Kálmán	Máté Matuszka	Assassination in Sarajevo	
2016	It's a matter of time	Idő kérdése	Dániel Csordás	Dániel Csordás	Szépirodalmi Figyelő Iss. 2015/2	
2017	The dots of the cheetah	A gepárd pöttyei	Nóra Vincze	Nóra Vincze	Curved Cat Comics	
2018	Noname	Noname	Miklós Felvidéki	Miklós Felvidéki	SZIF Online	
2019	Between the lines	A sorok között	Gyula Németh	Gyula Németh	Szépirodalmi Figyelő Iss. 2018/6	
2021	Ctrl-N	Ctrl-N	Gréta Fintor	Gréta Fintor	Wave Break	
2022	The Adventures of Zoé and Pamacs: The Spirit of the Aquincum Water Organ	Zoé és Pamacs kalandjai: Az aquincumi víziorgona szelleme	Gergely Oravecz	Móni Hudra	Anziksz Óbuda	
2023	There is no such thing in Pest	Pesten nem él ilyen	Gábor Molnár	Gábor Molnár	Rémképmesék	
2024	Small and big things	Apró és nagy dolgok	Ági Korbuly	Balázs Farkas	Transformations 1	
2025	The voice of nature	A természet hangja	Móni Hudra, Gergely Oravecz	Móni Hudra, Gergely Oravecz	Untold Stories #3	
2026	Pen Determiner	Tollhatározó	Barbara Bernát	Barbara Bernát	Ethno Comix 1.	

==== Nominees ====
Year	Translated title	Original title	Artist	Script	Publication title	Publisher
2006	Ripper jr.	Ripper jr.	Tibor Győri	Tibor Győri	Fekete-fehér képregényantológia 2.	Míves céh
2006	Plea	Fohász	Gábor Péteri	Dávid Cserkuti	Pinkhell 0.	MKA
2006	Tower	Torony	Tamás Gáspár	Tamás Gáspár	Pinkhell 0.	MKA
2007	One way	Csak oda	Tibor Győri	Zoltán Herega	Fekete-fehér képregényantológia 6.	Képes kiadó
2007	The Tower	A torony	Dávid Cserkuti	Imre Fekete	Pinkhell 2.	MKA
2007	The Cases of Detective Apoplectic	Guta nyomozó esetei	Mátyás Lanczinger	Mátyás Lanczinger	Fekete-fehér képregényantológia 5, Pinkhell 2.	Képes kiadó, MKA
2007	The Passenger	Az utas	Attila Futaki	Mátyás Sárközi	Roham	Roham
2008	Noname	Noname	Miklós Felvidéki	Miklós Felvidéki	Pinkhell 3.	MKA
2008	Death and the Compass	A halál és az iránytű	Zoltán Fritz	Zorro de Bianco - based on Jorge Luis Borges' short story	Pinkhell 2-3	MKA
2008	A Sad Monster Story	Egy szomorú szörny sztori	Nóra Vincze	Nóra Vincze	Panel special 1.	
2009	Chorister	Kántor	Péter Kovács	Péter Kovács	Zap	Roham
2009	Whole car	Whole car	Henrik Horváth	Péter Árva-Szabó	Zap	Roham
2009	The Sins of the Fathers	Az apák bűne	Graphit	Zorro de Bianco - based on Christianna Brand's short story	Pinkhell 5.	MKA
2010	Ágoston, the nuclear poultry: Animal memories	Ágoston, nukleáris baromfi: Állati emlék	Róbert Vass	Róbert Vass	Nero Blanco Comix 5.	Nero Blanco Comix
2010	Heavenly Luck	Mennyei szerencs	András Tálosi	András Tálosi	Bóni és Tim kalandjai 2.	by artist
2010	Orlando	Orlando	Graphit	Zorro de Bianco based on Virginia Woolf's novel	Pinkhell 6.	MKA
2010	Short Message Service #4	Short Message Service #4	Brazil	Brazil	Panel special 2.	
2011	The Package	A csomag	Artúr Haránt	Artúr Haránt	Pinkhell 7.	MKSZ
2011	The New Babel	Az új Bábel	Zoltán Koska	Zoltán Koska	Nero Blanco Comix 6.	Nero Blanco Comix
2011	King of Silence	Csendkirály	Henrik Horváth	Péter Árva-Szabó	Nero Blanco Comix 7.	Nero Blanco Comix
2011	Inverse	Inverz	Tamás Vári	Tamás Vári	11 történet	Kingpin

=== Best Comic Strip ===
==== Winners ====
Year	Translated title	Original title	Artist	Script	Publication title	Publisher
2006	Dodo	Dodó	Marabu (caricaturist)	Marabu	Kretén	Adoc-Semic
2007	Dodo	Dodó	Marabu	Marabu	Kretén	Adoc-Semic
2008	Strip	Strip	Péter Haragos	Péter Haragos	Papírmozi, Eduárd fapados képregényújság, Nero Blanco Comix	Képes kiadó
2009	(On) Paper	Papír(on)	Ottó Szentgyörgyi	Ottó Szentgyörgyi	Papír(on)	by artist
2010	Dodo	Dodó	Marabu	Marabu	Kretén	Adoc-Semic
2011	Blossa	Blossza	Gergely Oravecz	Gergely Oravecz	web, Műút	web, Műút

==== Nominees ====
Year	Translated title	Original title	Artist	Script	Publication title	Publisher
Year	Title	Title	Artist	Script	Publication	Publisher
2006	Johnny Smith	Kovács Pistike	Imre Fekete	Imre Fekete	Kretén	Adoc-Semic
2006	Tomster's Unbelievable Adventures	Tomster hihetetlen kalandjai	Tamás Pásztor	Tamás Pásztor		
2006	Rainbow Alley	Szivárvány köz	Zorro de Bianco	Zorro de Bianco	Pinkhell	MKA
2006	Mathematician Dr. Kalman Beer	Dr. Sör Kálmán matematikus	Gergely Göndöcs	Gergely Göndöcs	Kretén	Adoc-Semic
2007	Short Message Service	Short Message Service	Brazil	Brazil	Panel	
2007	Edward	Eduárd	Zsolt H. Garisa	Péter and Gábor Korcsmáros	Eduárd fapados képregényújság	Képes kiadó
2007	Strip	Strip	Péter Haragos	Péter Haragos	Pinkhell	MKA
2007	Johnny Smith	Kovács Pistike	Imre Fekete	Imre Fekete	Kretén	Adoc-Semic
2008	Dodo	Dodó	Marabu	Marabu	Kretén	Adoc-Semic
2008	Tomster's Unbelievable Adventures	Tomster hihetetlen kalandjai	Tamás Pásztor	Tamás Pásztor		
2008	Ash	Pernye	Péter Tikos	Jenő Szabó	Pinkhell	MKA
2009	Strip	Strip	Péter Haragos	Péter Haragos	Pinkhell	MKA
2009	Mathematician Dr. Kalman Beer	Dr. Sör Kálmán matematikus	Gergely Göndöcs	Gergely Göndöcs	Kretén	Adoc-Semic
2009	Weeping Tears	Csöpögő könnycsöppök	Marabu	Marabu	Kretén	Adoc-Semic
2009	Siege of the Naravan - epilogue	A Naravan ostroma	Péter Kovács	Péter Kovács	Panel	
2010	Balázs Gróf's onepagers	Gróf Balázs egyoldalasai	Balázs Gróf	Balázs Gróf	PestiEst	Pesti Est
2010	Tomster's Unbelievable Adventures	Tomster hihetetlen kalandjai	Tamás Pásztor	Tamás Pásztor		
2011	60+	60+	Zoltán Fritz	Zoltán Fritz	web	web
2011	The Fly	A légy	Gergely Fórizs	Gergely Fórizs		
2011	Dániel Csordás' strip blog	Csordás Dániel képreégnyes blogja	Dániel Csordás	Dániel Csordás	web	web
2011	Párkocka strips on hir24.hu		Párkocka group	Párkocka group	hir24.hu	hir24.hu

=== Best Single- or Double-page Comic ===
==== Winners ====
Year	Translated title	Original title	Artist	Script	Publication title	Publisher
Year	Title	Title	Artist	Script	Publication	Publisher
2007	8 minutes	8 perc	Dávid Cserkuti	Dávid Cserkuti	Fekete-fehér képreégnyantológia 5.	Képes kiadó
2008	On the Fifth Day	Az ötödik napon	Péter Kovács	Péter Kovács	Panel special 1	

==== Nominees ====
Year	Translated title	Original title	Artist	Script	Publication title	Publisher
2007	Princess	Királylány	Tamás Gáspár	Barnabás Ábrai (from Levente Király's idea)	Pinkhell	MKA
2007	Nero Blanco: The Consultant	Nero Blanco: A tanácsadó	Mátyás Lanczinger	Antal Bayer	Eduárd Fapados Képregényújság 5	Képes kiadó
2007	Role Modell	Példakép	Imre Fekete	Imre Fekete	Eduárd fapados képregényújság 4.	Képes kiadó
2007	Puzzle	Puzzle	Gergely Göndöcs	Gergely Göndöcs	Fekete-Fehér Képregényantológia 5	Képes kiadó
2008	Johnny Smith	Kovács Pistike	Imre Fekete	Imre Fekete	Kretén	Adoc-Semic
2008	Steve, who's so evil, it's unbearable	Sztív, aki annyira gonosz, hogy az már elviselhetetlen	Róbert Vass	Tamás Kemenes	Panel 5	
2008	This Is Not a Silentplay Prelude	Nem Néma játék előzetes	Miklós Felvidéki	Miklós Felvidéki	Panel 5	

=== Additional Awards ===
Awarded to comics that did not fit into the traditional categories above.

==== Winners ====
Year	Translated title	Original title	Artist	Script	Publication title	Publisher
2020	Everything Fits	Minden belefér	Gergely Oravecz	Gergely Oravecz		Szépirodalmi Figyelő
2025	Circumvented Cruiser	Megkerült Cirkáló	Zsolt H. Garisa, Zoltán Varga “Zerge”	Jenő Rejtő, Zsolt Garisa, Tibor Horváth, Éva Halasi		
2026	Joe Kalyber – From beginning to end	Kalyber Joe – Kezdettől végzetig		Roland Pilcz		

== Ernő Zórád Prize ==
Honoring a comic creator's outstanding yearly achievement. The prize was first awarded at the 100th anniversary of Ernő Zórád's birth with the contribution of the artist's family.

- 2011: Attila Futaki

== Pál Korcsmáros Award ==
The Pál Korcsmáros Award honors outstanding publishing and production of comic books and graphic novels in Hungary.

- 2012: Miklós Felvidéki
- 2013: Attila Fazekas
- 2014: András Tálosi
- 2015: Ferenc Kiss
- 2016: József Haui
- 2017: Marabu
- 2018: József Sváb
- 2019: Lajos Farkas
- 2020: Endre Sarlós
- 2021: Gyula Németh
- 2022: Sándor Kertész
- 2023: Mark Laszlo
- 2024: Levent Németh
- 2026: 5Panels

== Kepregeny.net Audience Polls ==
Every year since 2006, Kepregeny.net gives place to the annual audience polls to record comic book fans' opinion on the preceding year's crop. These polls cover many topics, not only Hungarian comics, but also translated materials, journalists, etc. In the first two years the polls were held on the portal's forum, in 2008 it moved to its opening page.
Note: the year given in each poll refers to the year the comics were published (in contrary to the Alfabéta prize, where the year refers to date the prize was given.)

=== 2005 ===
Best Comic Strip
Ranking	Translated title	Original title	Artist	Script	Publication title	% of votes
1.	Dilidodó	Dilidodó	Marabu	Marabu	Kretén, HVG	63,16
2.	Butapest (a pun mixing Budapest and the word buta, meaning stupid)	Butapest	Balázs Gróf	Balázs Gróf	Est program magazines	30,53

Best Short Story (humor category)
Ranking	Translated title	Original title	Artist	Script	Publication title	% of votes
1.	9 and 1/2 years old Johnny Smith	9 és 1/2 éves Kovács Pistike	Feki (Imre Fekete)	Feki (Imre Fekete)	Kretén	41,77
2.	Kretén editorial stories	Kretén szerkesztőségi történetek	Feki (Imre Fekete)	Feki (Imre Fekete)	Kretén	35,44
3.	Bunny and other stories	Nyúl és egyéb történetek	Róbert Vass	Róbert Vass	Kretén	11,39

Best Comic in Sci-fi Anthology
Ranking	Translated title	Original title	Artist	Script	Publication title	% of votes
1.	Bureaucrats	Bürokraták	Brazil	Balázs Oroszlány, Áron Németh	Roham	67,74
2.	Angelic Peace	Angyali béke	Roland Pilcz	Roland Pilcz	Új Galaxis	20,97

Best Short Story
Ranking	Translated title	Original title	Artist	Script	Publication title	% of votes
1.	The Sphere	A gömb	Imre Fekete	Imre Fekete	Fekete-fehér képregényantológia 2	16,82
2.	Bureocrats #1	Bürokraták #1	Brazil	Balázs Oroszlány, Áron Németh	Roham	15,89
3.	Our Most Precious	Szemünk Fénye	Geek	Geek	Sushi Strip 1	13,08

Best Publication
Ranking	Translated title	Original title	Artist	Script	% of votes	
1.	The Haven #1 - The caller	A Rév 1 - A hívó	Róbert Odegnál	Róbert Odegnál		40,15
2.	Kalyber Joe #1	Kalyber Joe #1	Roland Pilcz	Roland Pilcz		29,2
3.	Pinkhell #0	Pinkhell #0	MKA	MKA		15,33

=== 2006 ===
Favorite Script Writer
Ranking	Name	% of votes
1	Geek (Barnabás Ábrai)	20,97
2	Feki (Imre Fekete)	19,35
3	Balázs Oroszlány, Áron Németh	19,35

Favorite Artist
Ranking	Name	'% of votes
1	Dávid Cserkuti	13,64
2	Zorro de Bianco (Zoltán Fehér)	9,09
3	Attila Fazekas	7,58
3	Brazil (Szabolcs Tebeli)	7,58

Best Single- or Double-page Comic (incl. series)
Ranking	Translated title	Original title	Artist	Script	Publication title	Publisher	% of votes
1	8 minutes	8 perc	Dávid Cserkuti	Dávid Cserkuti	Fekete-fehér képregényantológia 5	Képes kiadó	25
2	Short Message Service	Short Message Service	Brazil	Brazil	Panel 1-3	Zoltán Ádám Szabó	19,74
3	10 minutes	10 perc	Tamás Gáspár	Zorro de Bianco	Pinkhell 3	MKA	10,53

Best Single- or Double-page Comic (humor category, incl. series)
Ranking	Translated title	Original title	Artist	Script	Publication title	Publisher	% of votes
1	What a Flash!	Micsoda flash!	Tamás Gáspár	Geek	Sushi Strip 2	by author	25,35
2	Johnny Smith	Kovács Pistike	Feki	Feki	Kretén	Adoc-Semic	22,54
3	Comic Speech	Comic Speech	Fritz, Lanczinger, Tamási	Fritz, Lanczinger, Tamási	Panel	Zoltán Ádám Szabó	12,68

Best Comic
Ranking	Translated title	Original title	Artist	Script	Publication title	Publisher	% of votes
1	Bureaucrats	Bürokraták	Brazil	Balázs Oroszlány, Áron Németh	Roham	Roham	31,71
2	Media 10	Média 10	Geek	Geek	Sushi Strip 2	by artist	15,85
3	His Majesty's Postal Train	Őfelsége postavonata	Gábor Matheika	Jenő Szabó	Eduárd 6-7	Képes kiadó	13,41
3	Sunday Safari	Vasárnapi szafari	Richárd Vass	Richárd Vass, Gábor Horváth	Galaktika 190-191	Metropolis Media Group Kft.	13,41

Best Short Story
Ranking	Translated title	Original title	Artist	Script	Publication title	Publisher	% of votes
1	One Way	Csak oda	Tibor Győri	Zoltán Herega	Fekete-fehér képregényantológia 6	Képes kiadó	11,94
2	Ace in the Spacesuit	Ász a szkafanderben	Fabe	Geek	Pinkhell 3	MKA	8,96
3	Vogel	Vogel	Zorro de bianco	Tamás Kemenes	Pinkhell 2	MKA	8,96

Best Comic in Crossword Magazine
Ranking	Translated title	Original title	Artist	Script	Publication title	Publisher	% of votes
1	Black Knight	A fekete lovag	Attila Fazekas	Attila Fazekas	Füles	Sonoma	57,58
2	The Diary of Adam and Eve	Ádám és Éva naplója	Gabriella Baracsi	Gabriella Baracsi	Füles	Sonoma	21,21
3	Pleasant Ghosts	Kedélyes kisértetek	Ferenc Podmaniczky	Ferenc Kiss	Füles évkönyv 2007 (Füles yearbook 2007)	Sonoma	21,21

Best Short Story in Crossword Magazine
Ranking	Translated title	Original title	Artist	Script	Publication title	Publisher	% of votes
1	Black Knight	A fekete lovag	Attila Fazekas	Attila Fazekas	Füles	Sonoma	57,58
2	The Diary of Adam and Eve	Ádám és Éva naplója	Gabriella Baracsi	Gabriella Baracsi	Füles	Sonoma	21,21
3	Pleasant Ghosts	Kedélyes kisértetek	Ferenc Podmaniczky	Ferenc Kiss	Füles évkönyv 2007 (Füles yearbook 2007)	Sonoma	21,21

Best Comics Publication
Ranking	Translated title	Original title	Artist, Script	Publisher	% of votes
1	The Adventures of Kalyber Joe #2	Kalyber Joe #2 (37 szavazat [42.05%])	Roland Pilcz	Factory Creative Studio	42,05
2	Pinkhell #1-2	Pinkhell #1-2 (29 szavazat [32.95%])	Various	MKA	32,95
3	Sushi Strip #2	Sushi Strip #2 (16 szavazat [18.18%])	Various	Barnabás Ábrai	18,18

Best Classic Comics Republishing Series
Ranking	Translated title	Original title	Publisher	% of votes
1	Black and White Comics Museum	Fekete-Fehér Képregénymúzeum	Míves céh	53,85
2	The Works of Imre Sebők	Sebők Imre munkái	Windom	23,08
3	Literature's Classics	Az Irodalom klasszikusai képregényben	Képes kiadó	15,38

=== 2007 ===
Best Script Writer
Ranking	Script Writer	% of votes
1	Antal Bayer	18
2	Szabó Jeno (A pilóta hagyatéka, Pernye, Rádiók ostroma, Parlamenti túlóra)	15
2	Kiss Ferenc (A titkos kert, A Fekete Kalóz, A kis tufaárus lány, Kétbalkezes gyilkosság és rengeteg másik rejtvényújságban megjelent képregény	15

Best Artist
Ranking	Script Writer	Comics made that year	% of votes
1	Attila Fazekas	Gemini-jelentés - Gemini File, A csodacsatár - The Miracle Forward	9
2	Róbert Odegnál	A Rév: Nekrológ - The Haven: Necrologue	6
2	Marabu	Dodó, Híres férfiak és a nők - Famous Men and the Women, Zoo	6

Best Comics Journal or Book
Ranking	Publication title	Content	% of votes
1	Panel	(periodical)	54
2	Kult Comix	(book collecting Attila Varró's articles)	19
3	Comics szocialista álruhában	(Sándor Kertész' Hungarian comics history book)	15

Best Comic
Ranking	Translated title	Original title	Artist	Script Writer	Publisher	% of votes
1	The Gemini file 1. - Hunting Twins	Gemini-jelentés: Ikervadászat	Attila Fazekas	Antal Bayer, based on Péter Korcsmáros' novel	Képes kiadó	36
2		Tinglitangó	Mihály Vass	Mihály Vass	Képes kiadó	23
3	Kulo city	Kulo city	Attila Stark	Attila Stark	Roham	18

Best sequentially Issued Comic
Ranking	Translated title	Original title	Artist	Script Writer	Publication title	Publisher	% of votes
1	The Black Pirate	A fekete kalóz	Ferenc Podmaniczky	Ferenc Kiss	Füles évkönyv 2008 (Füles yearbook)	Sonoma	39
2	Just an Average Monday	Csak egy átlagos hétfő	Feki	Feki	Kretén	Adoc-Semic	30
3	The Miracle Striker (a commonly used nickname for Ferenc Puskás)	A csodacsatár	Attila Fazekas	Attila Fazekas	Füles	Sonoma	20

Best Short Story
Ranking	Translated title	Original title	Artist	Script Writer	Publication title	Publisher	% of votes
1	The Haven: Necrologue	A Rév: Nekrológ	Róbert Odegnál	Róbert Odegnál	Eduárd 8	Képes kiadó	22
2	Noname	Noname	Miklós Felvidéki	Miklós Felvidéki	Pinkhell 3	MKA	16
3	My New Roommate Came from Outerspace	Az új lakótársam egy idegen bolygóról jött	Róbert Vass	Róbert Vass	Panel special 1	Zoltán Ádám Szabó	14

Best Short Story in Crossword Magazine
Ranking	Translated title	Original title	Artist	Script Writer	Publication title	% of votes
1	Special Torture Kinds	Válogatott kínzásnemek	Mihály Vass	Ferenc Kiss	Fülesbagoly	12
2	Tale About the Rowdy Mice	Mese a garázda egerekről	Feki	Feki	Fülesbagoly	8
2	The Invincibility	A halhatatlanság	Ferenc Podmaniczky	Ferenc Kiss	Fülesbagoly	8

Best Single- or Double Page Comic
Ranking	Translated title	Original title	Artist	Script Writer	'Publication title	Publisher	% of votes
1	Bigmouth Frog	Nagypofájú béka	Zoltán Fritz	Zoltán Fritz	Panel 5	Zoltán Ádám Szabó	9
2	On the Fifth Day	Az ötödik napon	Péter Kovács	Péter Kovács	Panel special 1	Zoltán Ádám Szabó	8
3	Routine	Rutin	Feki	Feki	Eduárd 8	Képes kiadó	7

Best Comic Strip
Ranking	Translated title	Original title	Artist	Script Writer	'Publication title	Publisher	% of votes
1	Dodo	Dodó	Marabu	Marabu	Kretén	Adoc-Semic	21
2	Tomster's Unbelievable Adventures	Tomster hihetetlen kalandjai	Tamás Pásztor	Tamás Pásztor	Panel	Zoltán Ádám Szabó	17
3	Strip	Strip	Péter Haragos	Péter Haragos	Papírmozi 2, Eduárd 9, Nero Blanco 1	Képes kiadó, MKA	11

Best Classic Comics Republishing Series
Ranking	Translated title	Original title	Publisher	% of votes
1	Literature's Classics	Az Irodalom klasszikusai képregényben	Képes kiadó	25
2	The Works of Imre Sebők	Sebők Imre munkái	Windom	22
3	Botond	Botond	Corvina	20

Best Anthology
Ranking	Title	Editor	Publisher	% of votes
1	Panel különszám 1 (Panel special 1)	Zoltán Ádám Szabó	Zoltán Ádám Szabó	59
2	Pinkhell 4	Zorro de Bianco	MKA	22
3	Nero Blanco Comix 1	Antal Bayer	Képes kiadó	10

Best Comic Publication
Ranking	Translated title	Original title	Artist	Script Writer	Publisher	% of votes
1	Dirty Fred, the Captain	Piszkos Fred, a kapitány	Pál Korcsmáros, Zsolt H. Garisa	Tibor Cs. Horváth, Zsolt H. Garisa	Képes kiadó	19
2	Panel special	Panel különszám	Various - Anthology	Various - Anthology	Zoltán Ádám Szabó	13
3	Gemini-File	Gemini jelentés	Attila Fazekas	Antal Bayer, based on Péter Korcsmáros' novel	Képes kiadó	10

== See also ==
- Hungarian comics
- List of comics awards
