= Comics Literacy Awareness =

UK literacy charity

- Established: 2014
- Mission: Promoting literacy through comic books
- Key people: trustees: Paul Register; Julie Tait; Ian Churchill; Emma Hayley; Dr. Mel Gibson; Bryan Talbot
- Location: United Kingdom
- Website: www.claw.org.uk

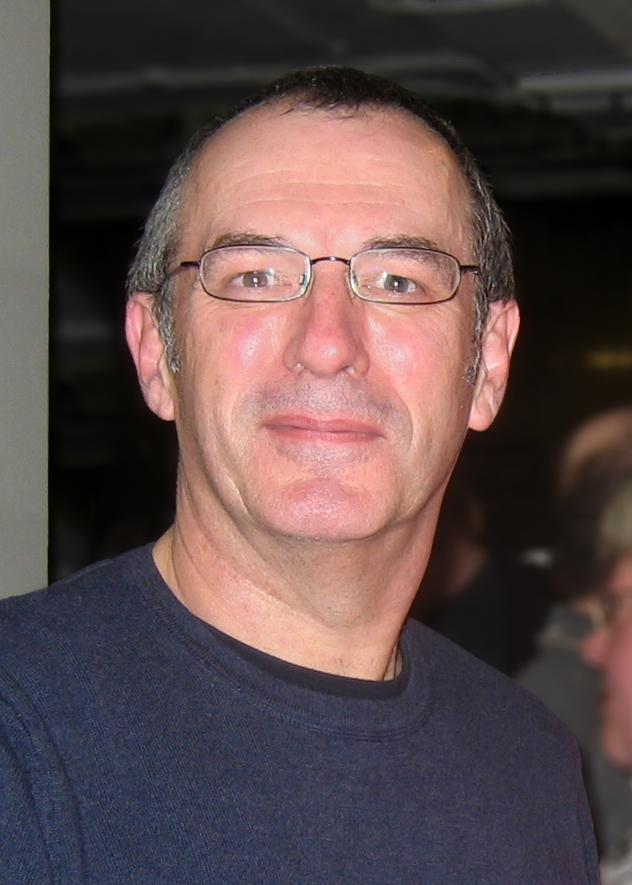
Dave Gibbons, Comics Laureate

Comics Literacy Awareness (CLAw) is a national organization in the United Kingdom promoting literacy through comic books.

Founded in 2014, it is a registered charity under English law and its mission is to raise the literacy levels of UK children through the medium of comics and graphic novels.

CLAw organizes the UK's Comics Laureate, on the model of the Children's Laureate, to act as an ambassador for comic books and their potential to improve literacy. The first Comics Laureate, Dave Gibbons, was selected in October 2014. Subsequent Comics Laureates have been Charlie Adlard (2017–19), Hannah Berry (2019–21), Stephen L. Holland (2021–23) and Bobby Joseph (2023–25).

== See also ==
- Kate Greenaway Medal
- List of comics awards
