= Here (2024 film) =

Film by Robert Zemeckis

- Canadian theatrical release poster
- Directed by: Robert Zemeckis
- Screenplay by: Eric Roth; Robert Zemeckis
- Based on: Here by Richard McGuire
- Produced by: Robert Zemeckis; Jack Rapke; Derek Hogue; Bill Block
- Starring: Tom Hanks; Robin Wright; Paul Bettany; Kelly Reilly
- Cinematography: Don Burgess
- Edited by: Jesse Goldsmith
- Music by: Alan Silvestri
- Production companies: Miramax; ImageMovers
- Distributed by: TriStar Pictures (through Sony Pictures Releasing)
- Release dates: October 25, 2024 (AFI Fest); November 1, 2024 (United States)
- Running time: 104 minutes
- Country: United States
- Language: English
- Budget: $45–50 million
- Box office: $16 million

Here is a 2024 American drama film produced and directed by Robert Zemeckis, who co-wrote the screenplay with Eric Roth, based on the 2014 graphic novel by Richard McGuire. Echoing the source material, the film is told in a nonlinear fashion: using a locked-down or "static shot" technique, the story covers a single plot of land and its inhabitants, from the distant past to the 21st century. During the film, the screen is often subdivided into panes, presenting events from different times simultaneously. The film stars Tom Hanks, Robin Wright, Paul Bettany, and Kelly Reilly, with digital de-aging via generative AI being used on much of the cast to have them portray their characters over time. Here premiered at the AFI Fest on October 25, 2024, before being theatrically released in the United States by TriStar Pictures through Sony Pictures Releasing on November 1, 2024. The film received generally negative reviews from critics and grossed $16 million.

== Plot ==
Dinosaurs are shown roaming an area until they are wiped out, and the ice age takes hold. After the ice age ends, the land turns green again. Much later, the area is home to the Lenni-Lenape people, and a storyline follows a man and woman, their courtship, family, and eventually the woman's death. After his wife's burial the man sees a hummingbird, which is seen periodically throughout the film as a reoccurring theme.

The area is then part of the estate of William Franklin, Benjamin Franklin's son (the last colonial governor of New Jersey from 1763 until 1776). Right around the turn of the 20th century, the home that becomes the center of most of the film's action is built. Its first tenants are John Harter and his wife, Pauline with their daughter. Mr. Harter has a deep passion for flying airplanes that his wife worries will be his death but ironically dies of the Spanish flu.

Later inhabitants of the house include the bohemian couple Leo, an inventor, and Stella Beekman, a pin-up model, who live there in the 1940s before and during World War II. Leo invents what becomes the La-Z-Boy recliner and the couple move to California.

The Young family—originally led by Al and Rose—buy the house in 1945, after the conclusion of World War II. The Youngs raise three children in the house: Richard, Elizabeth, and Jimmy. After an 18-year-old Richard gets his girlfriend Margaret pregnant, they get married and raise their daughter Vanessa in the house.

Sometime in the 1970s, Rose suffers a debilitating stroke and as a result, she and Al move to Florida to check into a rehabilitation facility. Al decides to hand the house over to Richard and Margaret, much to Margaret's chagrin.

In the early 2000s, sometime after Rose's death, Al moves back in. Not long after, Richard and Margaret divorce, though they remain friends. Richard ultimately ends up selling the house after Al dies.

By the mid- to late 2010s, the house is inhabited by African-Americans Devon and Helen Harris and their son Justin. Helen is devastated when their housekeeper, Raquel, dies of COVID-19. In the aftermath, Devon and Helen sell the house as well.

As an elderly man, Richard takes Margaret—who now has dementia—to the empty house in 2024. He tries to remind her of several special events they shared "Here" and the time Vanessa, as a child, lost a blue ribbon from school, which finally triggers all her happy memories of their shared lives. The stationary camera then starts to pan away, and shows the only outside shot of the original house as seen from William Franklin's mansion roof. A hummingbird appears in the final scene.

In a cut scene, in the far future, the home is flooded and then covered by a marsh.

== Cast ==
- Tom Hanks as Richard Young
- Robin Wright as Margaret Young, Richard's wife
- Paul Bettany as Al Young, Rose's husband and Richard's father
- Kelly Reilly as Rose Young, Al's wife and Richard's mother
- Lauren McQueen as Elizabeth Young
  - Beau Gadsdon as teen Elizabeth
- Harry Marcus as Jimmy Young
- Zsa Zsa Zemeckis as Vanessa Young, Richard and Margaret's daughter
- Michelle Dockery as Pauline Harter
- Gwilym Lee as John Harter, Pauline's husband
- David Fynn as Leo Beekman, an inventor
- Ophelia Lovibond as Stella Beekman, a pin-up model
- Nicholas Pinnock as Devon Harris
- Nikki Amuka-Bird as Helen Harris, Devon's wife
- Anya Marco Harris as Raquel, Devon and Helen's housekeeper
- Tony Way as Ted
- Jemima Rooper as Virginia
- Joel Oulette as Indigenous Man
- Dannie McCallum as Indigenous Woman
- Daniel Betts as William Franklin
- Leslie Zemeckis as Elizabeth Franklin
- Keith Bartlett as Benjamin Franklin
- Mohammed George as carriage driver
- Lilly Aspell as Bethany
- Jonathan Aris as Earl Higgins
- Angus Wright as Gilbert Moore, C.H.H.P
- Stuart Bowman as businessman
- Dexter Sol Ansell as boy in dress

== Production ==
The film adaptation of Here by Richard McGuire was announced in February 2022, with Playtone and ImageMovers producing, Eric Roth writing the script, Robert Zemeckis directing, and Tom Hanks set to star. To find investors, an auction for the movie's rights was to be brokered by CAA, which represents Hanks, Playtone and Roth, and WME, which represents Zemeckis and ImageMovers. However, all studios passed on the film at the package stage, seeing it as a risky and difficult movie for broad audiences.

In May 2022, Miramax joined as the financer and international sales agent and Sony Pictures landed distribution rights for the United States. Robin Wright was cast before the investor's announcement; in September, Paul Bettany and Kelly Reilly joined, followed by Leslie Zemeckis in February 2023, and Michelle Dockery and Gwilym Lee in April. It reunites Hanks and Wright, as well as Zemeckis, Roth, cinematographer Don Burgess, and composer Alan Silvestri for the first time in 30 years after the 1994 release of Forrest Gump.

Production began by January 2023 in Pinewood Studios. The production team used a new generative artificial intelligence technology called Metaphysic Live to face-swap and de-age the actors in real time as they perform instead of using additional post-production processing methods.

== Release ==
Here had its premiere at the AFI Fest in the TCL Chinese Theatre as the Centerpiece Screening on October 25, 2024, the day after Zemeckis was honored with a Director's Spotlight by the American Film Institute. The film was theatrically released by TriStar Pictures through Sony Pictures Releasing on November 1, 2024. It was originally set to have its world premiere in Los Angeles and New York on November 15, 2024, followed by a limited release in the United States on November 22, 2024, and a wider release on November 27, 2024. In June 2024, Sony Pictures moved the film's wide release to November 15, 2024, and in August, they brought it forward two weeks to November 1, 2024. Miramax sold the film to other distributors internationally, with Amazon MGM Studios handling the film's sales in the United Kingdom, Australia, New Zealand and German-speaking Europe, and Vertice 360 selling the film in Latin America (through BF Distribution) and Portugal; Vertice self-distributed the film in Spain. Local distributors include Eagle Pictures in Italy, Nordisk Film in Scandinavian territories, VVS Films in Canada, PVR Inox Pictures in India, Shaw Organisation in Singapore, and Huahua Media in China.

== Reception ==
=== Box office ===
In the United States and Canada, Here debuted to $4.9 million from 2,647 theaters, finishing in fifth place. It then finished in eighth with $2.4 million in its second weekend (a drop of 51%), before falling out of the top 10 in subsequent weeks.

=== Critical response ===
On the review aggregator website Rotten Tomatoes, 35% of 187 critics' reviews are positive, with an average rating of 5.0/10. The website's consensus reads: "While it's heartening to see director Robert Zemeckis return to humanistic storytelling, Here's stagey conceit and overabundance of spectacle robs it of emotional resonance." Metacritic, which uses a weighted average, assigned the film a score of 39 out of 100, based on 41 critics, indicating "generally unfavorable" reviews. Audiences polled by CinemaScore gave the film an average grade of "B–" on an A+ to F scale, while those surveyed by PostTrak gave the film a 69% positive score (with an average of three out of five stars).

Peter Sobczynski of RogerEbert.com gave the film one out of four stars and wrote: "Here is a work so cloying and ham-fisted in its attempts to move you that there is a point when you find yourself thinking that the only thing that Zemeckis hasn't thrown into the mix is a needle drop of 'Our House' and then he proceeds to do just that."

Regarding the film's adaptation of the McGuire original and its formalistic aspirations, Rolling Stone wrote: "On the page, the limitations somehow feel groundbreaking and expansive. Onscreen, the film somehow reduces the same notion of one angle/one thousand different moments to little more than a blinkered gimmick. Similarly, The Australian's critic gave the movie 2.5 out of 5 stars, writing: "This film is interesting to look at if you are interested in movie-making technique, but as a drama it is rather undramatic."

Pop culture writer Nathan Rabin also gave the film one out of five stars, writing that "Here fails as a movie, a play, an experiment and an art installation. It fails in every way that a movie can fail" and calling it "another sad illustration of the creative decline of a once-great filmmaker".

=== Accolades ===
Award	Date of ceremony	Category	Recipient(s)	Result	Ref.
Chicago International Film Festival	October 27, 2024	Founder's Legacy Award	Robert Zemeckis	Honored	
Visual Effects Society Awards	February 11, 2025	Emerging Technology Award	Jo Plaete, Oriel Frigo, Tomas Koutsky, Matteo Oliviero Dancy (for "Neural Performance Toolset" )	Won	
