= Dente Feira de Publicações =

Dente Feira de Publicações (Dente Publication Fair, in free translation) was an annual event aimed at independent and authorial production that took place from 2015 to 2019 in Brasília.

== History ==
Dente Feira de Publicações was created by the art collective Dente (formed by eight artists from Brasilia: Ana Terra Fensterseifer, Daniel Lopes, Heron Prado, Livia Viganó, Lovelove6, Lucas Gehre, Diana Salu and Tais Koshino). The event took place annually in Brasília since 2015 and, in addition to the fair with independent artists from all over the country, it also has a schedule of workshops, debates and conversation circles.

Dente also had smaller derivative events with the objective of stimulating the formation of public, such as Dente de Leite (similar to the main fair, but smaller and only with local authors), Feira 1,99 (with independent publications sold for the symbolic price of R$1.99) and Olimpíadas de Zines (with several games related to the production of fanzines).

Due to the COVID-19 pandemic, the Dente Feira de Publicações ceased to be held as of 2020.

== Locations and dates ==
No.	Dates	Location	Reference
1	June 6–7, 2015	Faculdade de Artes Dulcina de Moraes	
2	June 17–18, 2016	Conic	
3	June 17, 2017	Conic	
4	July 5–7, 2018	Conic	
5	June 5–8, 2019	Renato Russo Cultural Center	

== Prêmio Dente de Ouro ==
Prêmio Dente de Ouro
- Awarded for: Brazilian comics and fanzines
- Sponsored by: Feira Dente de Publicações
- Location: Brasília
- Country: Brazil
- First award: 2016
- Final award: 2020

In 2016, the organizers of Dente Feira de Publicações created the Prêmio Dente de Ouro (Golden Dente Award, in free translation), with the aim of rewarding independent authors in the categories of Best Zine, Best Comic and Best Art, Photo, Design, Experimental and/or Conceptual Publication. Entries were made online and the winners were chosen by a jury made up of members of the Dente art collective.

From the following year, only zines and comics were awarded. In addition, three different people linked to each theme were invited to be the judges for each edition. In 2019 the Best Poetry category was created, but it only lasted one edition. Also in 2019, there was a fee waiver policy for black and trans people who wanted to apply for the award.

In 2020, because of the COVID-19 pandemic, the Dente Feira de Publicações was not held and the Prêmio Dente de Ouro was held virtually, with the winners receiving R$1,000 and a "trophy brooch" sculpted by Julia Balthazar. It was also the last edition of the award.

=== Winners ===
2016

- Best Comic: O Ateneu (Mariana Paraizo – Mazô / independent)
- Best Zine: Visões Fantasmagóricas do Outro vol.1 (Fernanda Vallois and Julia Bernardino, org. / Truque)
- Best Art, Photo, Design, Experimental and/or Conceptual Publication: Mineiros Cavam no Escuro (Daniel Eizirik and João Kowacs / independent)

2017

- Best Comic: Magra de Ruim (Sirlanney / Lote 42)
- Best Zine: 11 Real (Charlene Cabral / Vendo Luzes e Meteoro)

2018

- Best Comic: Síncope (Aline Zouvi / independent)
- Best Zine: Mulheres na Tatuagem (Jupiter Coroá / independent)

2019

- Best Comic: Hibernáculo (Amanda Paschoal / independent)
- Best Zine: Pés Pretos Cantam Sonhos (Pedro Silva / AUA)
- Best Poetry: Sangue (Nanda Fer Pimenta / Pepê)

2020

- Best Comic: Pedra Pome (Rogi Silva / independent)
- Best Zine: Black Zine, Black Zone (Gabriela de Jesus Nunes / independent)
