= New York/New Wave =

Art exhibition

New York/New Wave was an exhibition curated by Diego Cortez in 1981. Held at the Long Island City gallery P.S.1, it documented the crossover between the downtown art and music scenes. The show featured a coalition of No wave musicians, painters, graffiti artists, poets, and photographers.

== History ==
The New Wave was a brief underground art and music post-punk pop art scene based around lower Manhattan that reflected the pulse of the late 1970s. By the early 1980s, the interest in it had transitioned from the streets into the art galleries of downtown New York. In June 1980, Colab's The Times Square Show, held in an abandoned multi-story massage parlor on 41st Street and Seventh Avenue, set the precedent as "the first radical art show of the eighties."

Diego Cortez, co-founder the Mudd Club, a venue for underground music and counterculture events, united the downtown scene for a group exhibition titled New York/New Wave. The show held at P.S.1 in Long Island City, Queens from February 15 to April 5, 1981.

The show featured over 100 participants, including Ray Johnson, Lawrence Weiner, William S. Burroughs, Andy Warhol, Jean-Michel Basquiat, Keith Haring, Fab Five Freddy, Futura 2000, Kenny Scharf, Stephen Sprouse, Christopher Makos, Duncan Hannah, Greer Lankton, Maripol, Marcus Leatherdale, William Coupon, Bob Gruen, Kate Simon and Edo Bertoglio. The walls were covered with works of different media hung side by side. The show opened up the New York art scene to the then 20-year-old Basquiat, who participated under the alias of his graffiti tag SAMO.

== Reception ==
John Perreault of the SoHo Weekly News was dumbfounded that the show was a huge hit: "Why so many people? Is the art world eager for a possible new wave slap in the face?" He found it "a plain and timid thing" and mocked the "New Wave" title by calling exhibition a "tidewrack."

Glenn O'Brien took a jibe at Perreault's review in his article for Interview magazine. "This is a tidal wave of art, about to reduce the entire art world to limp rubble, particularly the stuff that floats." He continued: "Here's a whole new art world ready to replace the old one. Of course the old one is not going to just pack up and move to Chicago because of an art show in Long Island City. But I can tell they're scared. And why? I think because here is art based on life, not on art. The public might like it."

== See also ==
- No Wave
- Just Another Asshole
- New wave music
- No wave cinema
- Post-punk
- CBGB
- Tier 3
