= Here (comics) =

6-page comic by Richard McGuire, later expanded into a full-length graphic novel

- Here graphic novel cover
- Date: Dec 2014
- Page count: 304 pages
- Publisher: Pantheon Books

Creative team
- Creator: Richard McGuire

Original publication
- Published in: Raw volume 2, #1
- Date of publication: 1989

"Here" is a 6-page comic story by Richard McGuire published in 1989, and expanded into a 304-page graphic novel in 2014. The concept of "Here" (in both versions) is to show the same location in space at different points in time, ranging from the primordial past to thousands of years in the future. "Here" has been recognized as a groundbreaking experiment with the formal properties of comics. The graphic novel was adapted into a film of the same name, directed by Robert Zemeckis, released in 2024.

== Overview ==
=== Original story ===
The sixth panel of the 1989 version of "Here".

The first panel of "Here" shows an unadorned corner of a room in a house. The 35 panels that follow all show the location in space depicted in the first panel at different points in time, ranging from the year 500,957,406,073 BC to the year 2033 AD. The panels are not ordered chronologically, and most of the panels are subdivided into multiple inset panels to show different points in time within the same panel.

Various people, animals, and furnishings are shown passing through the space, including several recurring characters, such as a woman shown cleaning the room in 1973, 1983, 1993, 1994, 1995, and 1996. The reader also does "get to see the whole life of a character named William, born in 1957, dead in 2027." The corner of the room itself is the most enduring presence in the story; panels show the house being constructed in 1902 and sheltering several generations of occupants before burning in a fire in 2029 and being demolished in 2030. The space is shown to be a barnyard in the 19th century before the house is built, and the site of open-air band concerts after the house has been razed.

=== Graphic novel ===
The graphic novel version expanded the concept to 304 pages in color, featuring 152 spreads, with "the corner of the eponymous room in the bound gutter of the open book." Using the same techniques — pages not ordered chronologically, with most pages subdivided into multiple inset panels to show different points in time within the same panel — it shows views of the same place from 3,000,500,000 BC to AD 22,175, "encompassing the lives of Native Americans and colonialists and moving from pre-human epochs to projected futures and species." The graphic novel establishes that the setting of the story eventually becomes part of the grounds of the Proprietary House, in Perth Amboy, New Jersey, primarily in a family home built on one of the land lots sold in 1904. A sequence of the book taking place in 1775 briefly depicts the political conflict between Benjamin Franklin and his son William, who occupied the Proprietary House. Most of the action of the book is set in the 20th and 21st centuries, when the fixed viewpoint encompasses the living room of a house built in 1907 (and destroyed by a cataclysmic flood in 2111).

== Concept and publication history ==
=== "Here" ===
McGuire discussed his vision of the story in a profile published in The Atlantic:

"If you stop to think about this, the 'now' becomes heightened," he says. "We are so rarely 'in the moment,' we spend most of our time thinking of the past or worrying about the future. The 'now' is the only thing that really exists."

A vital influence on McGuire's concept of "Here"

...came when a friend showed him a computer with some new software he'd never seen before: Microsoft Windows.... I thought, 'With multiple windows, you can have different times in the same space!' Another influence was 'the photographs that my mom used to take in one location, every year, at Christmastime,' of the kids as they grew up, changing over time."

The original six-page black-and-white story was published in Raw magazine volume 2, #1, in 1989. McGuire described the art style he used for it as "generic," saying, "It had to be as easy to read as an instruction manual, so the reader could follow what was happening very clearly when the interlaced time panels start being introduced."

=== Here ===
McGuire embarked on a graphic novel version of Here in 1999. In 2010, McGuire announced a graphic novel version of Here expanded to 300 pages, in full-color. As McGuire describes it,

"The book starts with the question, 'Why did I come in here again?' Which is what I was asking myself when I started this project. It took me a long time to figure out how exactly to make this book.... Going back into the project again was tricky. I felt it had to be similar to the original version, but in a new way. I didn't want to mimic that first approach, I never thought I would merely be adding pages to the original. This was to be a re-invention.... The book ends with a moment of recognition of the 'now.' The person finds the book they are looking for. Which is also my answer, I came back to this idea to make it into a book."

The McGuire profile in The Atlantic explains how the story grew, in fits and starts, into the graphic novel:

"My parents were still living in the house where I grew up, which is kind of the center of Here," he says. Then a few years after they had both passed away, McGuire was awarded The Dorothy and Lewis B. Cullman Center for Scholars and Writers fellowship at the New York Public Library, which gave him the time and resources to get focused on the project again.

As he developed the book, McGuire "built a little version of the room out of foamcore." When he "physically made the corner, or just folded a piece of paper," he came up with the conceit of the gutter of the book being the corner of the room.

The graphic novel, evoking "the feeling of a scrapbook or photo album," was done in tight vector art augmented by watercolors.

Here was published by Pantheon Books in December 2014.

==== Interactive edition ====
An Ebook edition of Here was released on the IOS platform in conjunction with the publication of the graphic novel. Here's non-linear structure made it particularly well-suited for adaptation into new media: the Ebook format deconstructs the traditional book experience, allowing readers to swipe through pages as in the book or explore the narrative more freely; the backgrounds and panels are liberated from their original layouts, enabling unique recombinations and fresh connections. The complete version features subtly timed animated GIFs, such as a curtain moving gently in a breeze, a petal falling, or a reader turning a page, offering unexpected, nuanced movement. To set it apart from film or video, the Ebook version omits sound effects and music to preserve a reading-focused experience.

== Graphic novel plot summary ==
The earliest scenes occur between 3,000,500,000 BCE and 1009 BCE. Earth forms in the Hadean and Archean periods, the area alternates between marsh and rocky terrain, and dinosaurs — including a Tyrannosaurus — roam the land. Much later, a mastodon and then a bison appear; the area evolves into a swamp and then a tree-lined lake.

Beginning in 1203 CE, the Lenape people inhabit the land. A 1352 scene shows a naked woman swimming. Lenape hunters, deer, and a wolf appear; by 1553, a small creek and a forest surround a longhouse. In 1609, a young Lenape couple flirts and playfully wrestles in the woods. The man tells a mythic tale of a beast that eats people and wants to have sex first; the woman mocks him for being "a nasty liar."

In 1624, after the Dutch arrive, Lenapes present a Dutch trader with a bag of dirt. He questions whether it's a joke; the Lenape men smirk. By 1764, the Proprietary House is built, becoming part of the estate of William Franklin, son of Benjamin Franklin (and the last colonial governor of New Jersey). In 1775, William and his wife prepare nervously for a visit from Benjamin and their son "little Billy," who has been living with Benjamin. William and Benjamin are at political odds as the American Revolutionary War looms. During the visit, Benjamin reflects on how life rhymes: now he returns with his grandson to visit his own son. Though everyone hopes to avoid political debate, Benjamin and William eventually clash. In 1783, the Proprietary House is shown on fire.

In 1870, the house is restored, and an artist paints a nearby ridge while ignoring his muse's suggestion to paint her. She walks away after he rebuffs her interest. By 1906, other homes have been built nearby. In 1907, the main house central to the book's action is constructed. In 1910, it is occupied; in 1916, a funeral is held with a mummy-like corpse in a living room casket. In 1924, a woman holds a newborn — possibly the first of many births in the house.

By 1935, a large dollhouse in the home resembles the actual house. In 1938 and 1942, new occupants appear. In the late 1940s or early 1950s, a couple moves in and raises five children: Bobby, Mary, Billy, and two younger siblings.

In 1957, a woman in a pink dress forgets why she entered the room, picks up a yellow book, and remembers. She is shown to be both the first and last person in the book. A painting above the mantel depicts the area before settlement.

In 1986, the woman — now elderly — cleans the room while reflecting: "The more I clean, the more it gets dirty," and, "Eventually I'll know nothing." The doorbell rings, and three people from the archaeological society arrive, expressing interest in the "historic building across the street" (e.g., the Proprietary House) and her property. She welcomes them, noting her love of colonial history. The visitors suspect there may be Native American burial sites nearby. This possibility unsettles her.

In 1999, a woman sits reading a newspaper while three teenage girls watch TV, which discusses the Earth's fate eight million years in the future when the sun becomes a red giant. One girl remarks, "Glad I won't be around for that!"

In 2005, the father of the large family — now quite elderly — suffers an accident, and by 2007 is no longer in the home. The house appears vacant until 2014, when a new couple moves in.

In 2111, a massive flood destroys the house and the surrounding area. By 2213, a marsh has formed, with a boardwalk running through it. A virtual tour guide projects images of the house through time to a crowd of visitors. She remarks that in the 20th century, nearly everyone carried a wallet, watch, and keys.

The book's narrative concludes in the year 22,175. Civilization is gone. A dinosaur-like creature stares at a fish; in the foreground are giant tropical flowers and some pollinating hummingbirds. The creature lifts its head — perhaps calling out.

== Themes ==
In Here, recurring elements such as watches, wallets, and keys; children being born; moments of intimacy, laughter, and insult; and household details like what hangs above the mantelpiece function as narrative motifs that reinforce the graphic novel's central themes of time, continuity, and the human experience within a fixed physical space. These motifs appear across disparate eras, lending cohesion to the book's fragmentary, non-linear structure. Domestic objects and repeated actions — sleeping, dreaming, dancing, playing games — highlight the cyclical and universal aspects of life, while moments of conflict and loss emphasize its transience and unpredictability.

By weaving these elements through centuries of scenes in the same location, McGuire evokes a sense of historical layering, where individual moments echo one another across time. For example, people in costumes: these moments introduce playful temporality — people temporarily becoming someone else, echoing how the house "wears" different time periods. Costume play becomes a metaphor for the shifting masks of history. The effect is a meditation on impermanence and recurrence: though the characters and technologies change, certain human behaviors and emotional responses remain constant. This interplay of permanence and ephemerality underscores the book's larger inquiry into memory, place, and the passage of time.

=== Autobiographical content ===
Elements of the graphic novel are autobiographical, particularly the house built in 1907 across from the Proprietary House that McGuire admits is essentially the house he grew up in Perth Amboy, New Jersey. Similarly:

"There's a moment in the book where these archeologists come to the house, and they're talking about digging up the back yard. That really happened," he said. His mother loved history and would take him, as a kid, to see Washington's headquarters, where he'd look at a velvet rope blocking off a historic room and imagine who had been there. "But she drew the line at the idea of digging up her garden. When they left, she told me that they said there were Indian bones in the backyard. I never looked at my backyard the same way."

The motif of photographs that were taken by his family "'in one location, every year, at Christmastime,' of the kids as they grew up, changing over time,... [also] appear[s] in the graphic novel."

== Reception ==
The 1989 original story has been recognized as a groundbreaking experiment with the formal properties of comics. Douglas Wolk wrote that its "influence has echoed through art comics for decades." Its influence is particularly notable in the work of Chris Ware, who wrote a lengthy essay on it in the magazine Comic Art #8 (2006). The original story was reprinted for the first time in that issue. It has been frequently anthologized since its original publication.

Writer Lee Konstantinou's analysis of the 2014 version of the story came to the conclusion:

More so than the original Raw six-pager, the book version of Here dwells on the radical (because intrinsic) destructibility of life.... Though we get a glimpse of what might be some sort of utopian future, Here's human story ultimately stands against a stark background largely devoid of human presence. That is, a yawning cosmic indifference bookends the life of McGuire's little house.

The New Yorker's Sarah Larson felt differently about the book's tone, writing:

The inclusiveness of McGuire's approach, and his careful observational humor, feels affectionate and empathetic.... The book is mesmerizing in a different way from its pen-and-ink source: because it feels three-dimensional while you're reading it, the book almost becomes your home. It's soothing and full-color, with soft hues and a visual style somewhere between a picture book and a graphic novel. (Some of the colors evoke those in faded photographs.)

The French edition of the graphic novel, titled Ici and published by Éditions Gallimard, was given the Angoulême International Comics Festival Prize for Best Album in 2016. Here was given a 2nd-place award at the 2017 Gaiman Awards. The Portuguese-language edition, titled Aqui and published by Cia. das Letras, was given the Silver Prêmio Grampo in Brazil in 2018.

The opening segment of the 2022 British animated anthology television special The House was inspired by Here. As animator Marc James Roels relates, his and Emma de Swaef's story segment came from the desire to tell "the story of the house before there was a house.... I had been reading a graphic novel by Richard McGuire called Here, in which you see a corner of the world and how it changes through millennia. You see it as farmland, and when it was inhabited by Native Americans, and before that when there were dinosaurs. And then suddenly you're in the 1950s and someone's vacuuming the floor. And it kind of sparked off an idea, like what was there before the house?"

== Film adaptations ==
In 1991, a six-minute short film adaptation of the original six-page 1989 comic was produced at RIT's Department of Film and Video by students Timothy Masick and Bill Trainor for their senior thesis project.

An immersive VR film based on the 2014 graphic novel version was conceived and created by British design and production company 59 Productions under the direction of Lysander Ashton with original music by Anna Meredith, which opened at the 2020 Venice Film Festival. The performances were filmed at Intel Studios in Los Angeles using volumetric capture technology.

A film adaptation began development in 2022 with Robert Zemeckis directing and co-writing with Eric Roth, and Tom Hanks starring; Robin Wright joined the cast reuniting the four for the first time in thirty years after Forrest Gump in 1994. Zemeckis and Hanks' studios ImageMovers and Playtone produced the film. Miramax came on board as financier and international sales agent, and Sony Pictures acquired U.S. distribution rights to the film before the Cannes Film Market. The film was released on November 1, 2024.

== Museum exhibition ==
In 2014, in commemoration of the publication of the graphic novel, the Morgan Library & Museum (collaborating with the New York Public Library) launched the exhibition "From Here to Here: Richard McGuire Makes a Book," which tracked the process behind McGuire's story and expansion of the story to a full-length work. McGuire relished the synchronicity of "having the exhibition in a one-room gallery that is about a book that takes place in one room."

== See also ==
- Walt Disney's Carousel of Progress — similar concept of a single home seen at various points in time
