= Gaiman Award =

Japanese comics award

The Gaiman Award (Japanese: ガイマン賞, Hepburn: Gaiman-shō) is a Japanese award given since 2011 to comic books created outside Japan and translated to Japanese. The word "gaiman" is a shortening of gaikoku no manga (foreign manga), encompassing styles like American comics, French bande dessinée and Korean manhwa. The award is sponsored by Kyoto International Manga Museum, Kitakyushu Manga Museum and Meiji University's Yonezawa Memorial Library of Manga and Subculture and was created to raise awareness of non-Japanese comics in Japan.

== Winners ==
Year	1st place	2nd place	3rd place	Kosei Ono Special Prize
2011	Arrugas by Paco Roca (Spain)	Civil War by Mark Millar and Steve McNiven (United States)	Le Bibendum céleste by Nicolas de Crécy (France)	(not awarded)
2012	Les Cités Obscures by François Schuiten and Benoît Peeters (Belgium)	Superman: Red Son by Mark Millar, Dave Johnson and Killian Plunkett (United States)	Muchacho by Emmanuel Lepage (France)	(not awarded)
2013	A Taste of Chlorine by Bastien Vivès (France)	I Kill Giants by Joe Kelly and Ken Niimura (United States)	Neet Metal by Daniel Ahlgren (Sweden), Black Hole by Charles Burns (USA) and Superman for All Seasons by Jeph Loeb and Tim Sale (United States)	(not awarded)
2014	Hawkeye:My Life as a Weapon, by Matt Fraction (United States)	The Kampung Boy, by Lat (Malaysia)	Beautiful Darkness (Jolies Ténébres), by Kerascoët (pen name of Marie Pommepuy and Sébastien Cosset) and Fabien Vehlmann (France/Belgium)	Little Nemo 1905-1914, by Winsor McKay (United States).
2015	Sayonara September by Åsa Ekström (Sweden)	The New 52: Shazam, by Geoff Johns and Gary Frank (United States)	Transformers: All Hail Megatron, by Shane McCarthy and Guido Guidi (United States)	Town Boy, by Lat (Malaysia)
2016	Grayson by Tim Seeley & Tom King (writers), Mikel Janin and Stephen Mooney (art) (United States)	Lastman #1, by Bastien Vivès, Balak and Michael Sanlaville (France)	Gotham Academy, by Becky Cloonan, Brenden Fletcher and Karl Kerschl (United States)	(not awarded)
2017	Finnish Nightmares, by Karoliina Korhonen (Finland); Cable and Deadpool:The Burnt Offering, by Fabian Nicieza and Patrick Zircher (Readers' choice)	Here, by Richard McGuire (United States); Get Jiro, by Anthony Bourdain, Langdon Fosse and Ale Garza (United States- Readers' choice)	DC Universe: Rebirth, by Geoff Johns, Gary Frank, Ivan Reis, Ethan van Sciver and Phil Jimenez (United States); Son of Superman, by Peter J. Tomasi, Patrick Gleason, Doug Mahnke and Jorge Jimenez (Readers' choice).	Le Piano Oriental, by Zeina Abirached (France)
2018	Spider-Man/Deadpool: Bromance; Spider-Man/Deadpool: Sidepieces, and Spider-Man/Deadpool: Itsy-Bitsy by Joe Kelly, Ed McGuiness, Scott Aukerman, Reilly Brown and Scott Koblish (United States)	The Unbelievable Gwenpool, by Christopher Hastings, Gurihiru, Danilo Beyruth and Irene Strychalski (United States)	Madgermanes, by Birgit Wehye (Germany)	Fun Home: A Family Tragicomic, by Alison Bechdel (United States)
