= Richard McGuire =

American illustrator, comic book artist, children's book author, and musician

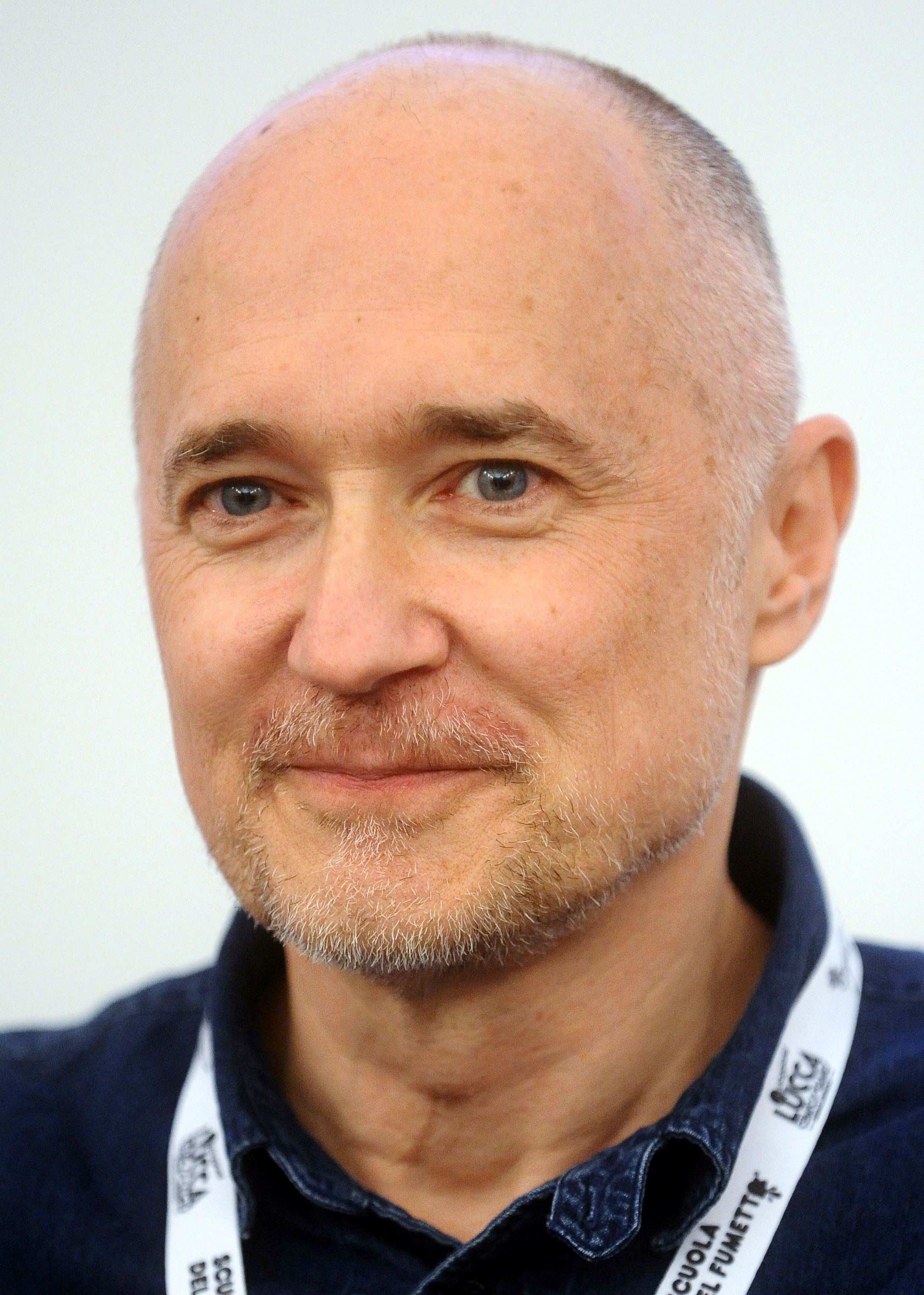
- McGuire in 2015
- Born: 1957 (age 68–69); New Jersey, US
- Education: Rutgers University
- Known for: Graphic novel
- Notable work: "Here"

Richard McGuire (born 1957 in New Jersey) is an American graphic novelist, artist, and musician. His illustrations have been published in The New York Times, The New Yorker, and Le Monde, and his work is in the collections of the Museum of Modern Art and the Morgan Library & Museum. His comic "Here" received critical acclaim, and was later adapted into a film of the same name directed by Robert Zemeckis and starring Tom Hanks..

== Biography ==
McGuire was born and raised in Perth Amboy, New Jersey. He graduated from Rutgers University.

Soon after graduating college, McGuire and a group of friends formed the band Liquid Idiot before relocating to Manhattan in 1979. There, the group reformed as the dance-punk band Liquid Liquid, with McGuire serving as the band's bassist. Liquid Liquid is best known for the song "Cavern", whose bass line has been frequently sampled. The group disbanded in 1983, later reforming in 2008.

McGuire's early art career was as a street artist in the 1980s East Village scene. He participated in the landmark 1981 "New York/New Wave" group exhibition at PS1 in Long Island City, alongside notable figures such as Robert Mapplethorpe, Jean-Michel Basquiat, and David Byrne.

McGuire was a key contributor to the 1995 chain story / comic jam The Narrative Corpse, shepherded by Art Spiegelman and Robert Sikoryak. McGuire was brought in to link Strand 2 of the story back to Strand 1 (bridging the contributions of Carol Swain and Drew Friedman).

McGuire was the designer of the logo of PBS Kids, which was used from 1999 to 2022.

McGuire's first cover for The New Yorker was published in 1993; from 2006 to 2011 his work appeared regularly on the magazine's covers.

In 2001, McGuire made two limited-edition, screenprinted artist's books for the French publisher Cornelius. The first one, Popeye and Olive, was an "abstract love story". In the second book, P + O, McGuire "rearranged the silhouetted shapes of the two characters into new combinations which became a 'vocabulary of the relationship'." In 2023 an offset edition of Popeye and Olive was published by Fotokino.

In 2009, McGuire was awarded The Dorothy and Lewis B. Cullman Center for Scholars and Writers fellowship at the New York Public Library.

== Bibliography ==
=== Comics ===
==== Short stories ====
- "The Dot Man," 1 pg. from Bad News #3 (Fantagraphics, 1988)
- "Here", 6 pgs. from RAW vol. 2 #1 (1989) (ISBN 9780140122657). Reprinted in An Anthology of Graphic Fiction, Cartoons and True Stories vol. 1 (Yale University Press, 2006) (ISBN 9780300111705) and Comic Art #8 (Buenaventura Press, 2006) (ISBN 9781584232575)
- "The Thinkers," 1 pg. from RAW vol. 2 #2 (1990) (ISBN 9780140122657)
- "Bon appétit," fold-out comic booklet from 2wBOX Set I (Switzerland: Bülb Comix, 2002)
- "ctrl," 6 pgs. from Timothy McSweeney's Quarterly Concern#13 (2003) (ISBN 9781932416084)

==== Graphic novels ====
- Here (Pantheon: 2014) (ISBN 9780375406508)

=== Children's literature ===
- The Orange Book (New York: Children's Universe, 1992) (ISBN 9780847814657)
- Night Becomes Day (New York: Viking, 1994) (ISBN 9780670855476)
- What Goes Around Comes Around (New York: Viking, 1995) (ISBN 9780670863969)
- What's Wrong With This Book? (New York: Viking, 1997) (ISBN 9780670868520)
- PBS Kids logo 1999 to 2022 (1999)

=== Artist's books ===
- Popeye and Olive (Paris: Cornelius, 2001) (ISBN 9782909990620)
- P+O (Paris: Cornelius, 2002) (ISBN 2909990605)
- Listen (Marseille: Fotokino, 2021) (ISBN 978-2-902565-16-0)

== Filmography ==
- "Micro Loup" (7-minute short from Loulou et autres loups, 2003)
- Peur(s) du noir (16-minute untitled segment, 2007)

== Awards ==
- 2009 Dorothy and Lewis B. Cullman Center for Scholars and Writers fellowship at the New York Public Library
- 2016 Angoulême International Comics Festival Prize for Best Album for the French edition of Here, titled Ici and published by Éditions Gallimard
- 2017 Gaiman Award 2nd place for Here
- 2018 Prêmio Grampo Silver for the Portuguese-language edition of Here, titled Aqui and published by Cia. das Letras

== Public exhibitions ==
- 1981 "New York/New Wave" (PS1, Long Island City) — group show curated by Diego Cortez
- 2014 "From Here to Here: Richard McGuire Makes a Book" (Morgan Library & Museum, New York City)
- 2018–2019 "Richard McGuire: The Way There and Back" (The Aldrich Contemporary Art Museum, Ridgefield, Connecticut) — exhibition of 60 tabletop sculptures
- 2021 "Sound and Vision" (Fotokino, Marseille, France)
- 2024 "Richard McGuire: Then and There, Here and Now" (Cartoonmuseum Basel – Centre for Narrative Art, Basel, Switzerland)
