= Prêmio Grampo =

Prêmio Grampo de Grandes HQs
- Awarded for: Brazilian comics
- Sponsored by: Ramon Vitral, Lielson Zeni and Maria Clara Carneiro
- Location: São Paulo
- Country: Brazil
- First award: 2016

Prêmio Grampo de Grandes HQs (Grampo Awards for Great Comics), also just called Prêmio Grampo, is a comics award aimed at choosing the best comic books and graphic novels published in Brazil each year. Considered one of the most important awards in the Brazilian comics market, it was created by journalist Ramon Vitral and editor Lielson Zeni in 2015 (with the first award taking place at the beginning of the following year), and has professor and translator Maria Clara Carneiro in the organization since the second edition. The inspiration for the award was the "Best of the Year" lists made annually by journalist Télio Navega on his blog Gibizada (which ended in 2015) based on rankings made by people connected to the Brazilian comics scene.

The three first places (classified, respectively, as Gold, Silver and Bronze) are chosen from a selection of all the comics launched in Brazil based on individual lists with 10 titles in order of preference prepared by 20 guest judges (usually comic artists, editors, journalists, researchers and entrepreneurs linked to the Brazilian comics market).

All comics released in Brazil, whether national or foreign, independent or by a publishing house, are eligible for the award. The only requirement is that they are so far unpublished in the country (republications are allowed as long as they are in a new format or translation). The result is released at the beginning of each year, with reference to publications launched between January 1 and December 31 of the previous year. In addition to the results of the three best-placed works, the "top 20" and the individual ranking of each judge are also presented.

== Winners ==
2016

- Gold: Aventuras na Ilha do Tesouro, by Pedro Cobiaco (Mino)
- Silver: Talco de Vidro, by Marcello Quintanilha (Veneta)
- Bronze: Dupin, by Leandro Melite (Zarabatana)

2017

- Gold: Bulldogma, by Wagner Willian (Veneta)
- Silver: Você é um Babaca, Bernardo, by Alexandre S. Lourenço (Mino)
- Bronze: Desconstruindo Una (Becoming Unbecoming), by Una, translated by Carol Christo (Nemo)

2018

- Gold: Angola Janga - Uma História de Palmares, by Marcelo D'Salete (Veneta)
- Silver: Aqui (Here), by Richard McGuire, translated by Érico Assis (Cia das Letras)
- Bronze: Mensur, by Rafael Coutinho (Cia das Letras)

2019

- Gold: Ayako, by Osamu Tezuka, translated by Marcelo Yamashita Salles and Esther Sumi (Veneta)
- Silver: A Arte de Charlie Chan Hock Chye (The Art of Charlie Chan Hock Chye), by Sonny Liew, translated by Maria Clara Carneiro (Pipoca & Nanquim)
- Bronze: Eles Estão por Aí, by Bianca Pinheiro and Greg Stella (Todavia)

2020

- Gold: Minha Coisa Favorita É Monstro (My Favorite Thing Is Monsters), by Emil Ferris, translated by Érico Assis (Companhia das Letras)
- Silver: Luzes de Niterói, by Marcello Quintanilha (Veneta)
- Bronze: Intrusos (Killing and Dying), by Adrian Tomine, translated by Érico Assis (Nemo)

2021

- Gold: Sabrina, by Nick Drnaso, translated by Érico Assis (Veneta)
- Silver: A Solidão de um Quadrinho Sem Fim (The Loneliness of the Long-Distance Cartoonist), by Adrian Tomine, translated by Érico Assis (Nemo)
- Bronze: Mau Caminho (Bad Gateway), by Simon Hanselmann, translated by Diego Gerlach (Veneta)

2022

- Gold: Escuta, Formosa Márcia, by Marcello Quintanilha (Veneta)
- Silver: Manual do Minotauro, by Laerte Coutinho (Companhia das Letras)
- Bronze: Carniça e a Blindagem Mística - Parte 2: A Tutela do Oculto, by Shiko (independent)
