= Prêmio LeBlanc =

- Awarded for: Brazilian comics, animation, fantastic literature and games
- Sponsored by: ECO-UFRJ and UVA
- Location: Rio de Janeiro
- Country: Brazil
- First award: 2018
- Website: Link

Prêmio LeBlanc (LeBlanc Awards) is a Brazilian award created in 2018 and intended to reward national works in the areas of comics, animation, fantastic literature and games (this one, from the second edition onwards). The name of the award pays tribute to the Haitian artist André LeBlanc, who lived and worked for many years in Brazil and the United States.

The award is organized by the Graduate Program in Creative Media from School of Communication of the Federal University of Rio de Janeiro and by the Veiga de Almeida University, institutions also responsible for the Semana Internacional de Quadrinhos (SIQ), an academic event on comics held at UFRJ during which traditionally takes place the trophy presentation ceremony.

Voting takes place in two stages: first, a popular vote defines the three finalists of each category who are later analyzed by a technical jury that defines each winner. Any works released between January 1 and December 31 of the year preceding the award can be nominated, as long as they are relevant to the category.
