= Finnish Nightmares =

2015 stick figure webcomic

- Logo
- Author(s): Karoliina Korhonen
- Website: finnishnightmares.blogspot.com
- Current status/schedule: Ongoing
- Launch date: 2015

Finnish Nightmares is a webcomic by Karoliina Korhonen, presenting the daily life and struggles of Matti, a socially awkward Finn. The webcomic is particularly popular in China, where the Finnish vision of privacy and personal space struck a chord with people living in crowded cities.

== Overview ==
Matti gets anxious when people around him are loud in public.

Finnish Nightmares is an English-language stick figure webcomic initially developed by Korhonen with the goal of entertaining herself and her friends. The cartoon stars Matti, a socially awkward character who prefers minimal contact and avoids social situations. Korhonen describes the character as "a stereotypical Finn who appreciates peace, quiet and personal space. Matti tries his best to do unto others as he wishes to be done unto him: to give space, be polite and not bother with unnecessary chit chat." The character comes across as perpetually uncomfortable who hides from his neighbors and hates being singled out. Korhonen wrote on her blog that some traits associated with introversion are part of Finnish culture and code of conduct, such as giving others a large amount of personal space. Ephrat Livni of Quartz noted that Matti seems introverted even by Finnish standards.

== Popularity in China ==
Privacy and personal space are often unfamiliar luxuries to people living in crowded Chinese cities. Finnish Nightmares became strongly popular on Chinese online platforms in 2019. Matti's fear of crowds and small talk resonated with many Chinese readers who experience anxiety in the overpopulated streets of Chinese cities. Many of these readers are appealed to Finnish culture as presented in the webcomic; a culture in which privacy and personal space are considered important and commonplace. Fans of the webcomic coined the Mandarin word jīngfēn (Chinese: 精芬; lit. 'spiritually Finnish') to describe people who, like Matti, dislike socializing and long for more personal space.

Korhonen was surprised by her webcomic's popularity in China. Writing to Sixth Tone, she said "I thought Chinese people might be used to crowded places." Korhonen supports the term jingfen, noting that "everyone can have a little bit of Matti in them, regardless of where they are from."

== Publication ==
Korhonen launched her webcomic in 2015 on Blogspot. The webcomic was adapted into a comic book in 2016 and published by Atena. A second adaptation of Finnish Nightmares, titled Matti in the Wallet, was published by Atena in Q2 2019. Both books were listed on the Bookstore Federation charts for several months in 2019. The webcomic was internationally published in August 2019 as a 96-page humorous guidebook, titled Finnish Nightmares: An Irreverent Guide to Life's Awkward Moments.

Finnish Nightmares was translated into Chinese and Japanese, and has possibly also been translated into Korean. Sales expectations in these regions were high, as Atena received exceptionally high advances on translations. Matti is Still Depressed Today won a Gaiman Award in Japan in 2017.
