= Renato Russo Cultural Center =

- Espaço Cultural Renato Russo
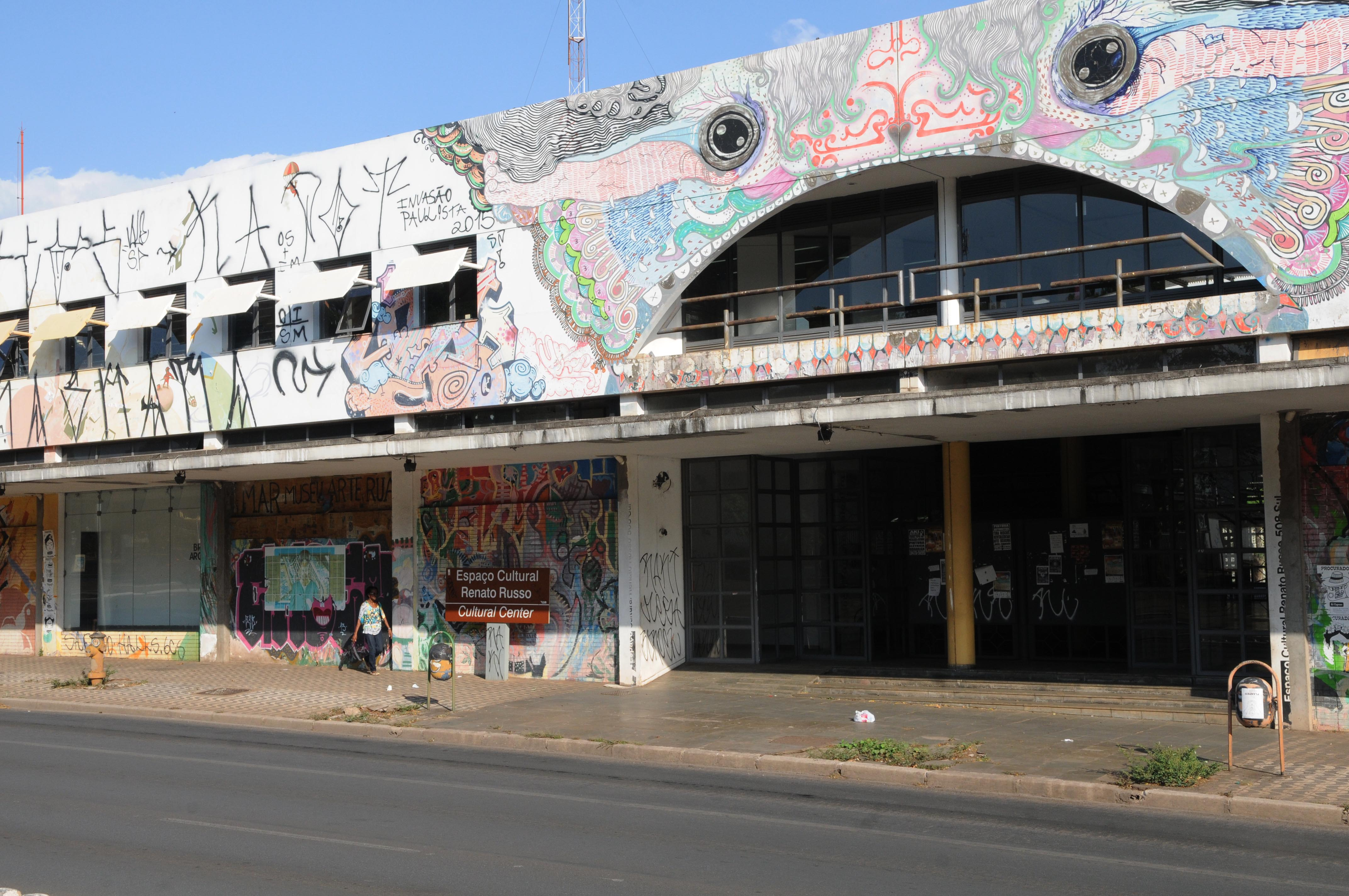
- Interactive map of Renato Russo Cultural Center
- Etymology: Renato Russo

General information
- Type: Cultural center
- Location: W3 Sul, 508, Asa Sul, Brasília
- Coordinates: 15°48′46″N 47°54′21″W
- Inaugurated: 1974
- Owner: Secretariat of Culture of the Federal District

The Renato Russo Cultural Center is a cultural institution run by the Secretariat of Culture of the Federal District. It is a public cultural center and agency belonging to the structure of the Federal District's Secretariat for Culture and Creative Economy. It is located in Brazil's capital, Brasília, in the Federal District.

The Center has many interconnected buildings. The oldest of them dates back to the 70s, when it housed the headquarters of the Cultural Foundation of the Federal District. Other structures were gradually incorporated over time, including the Center for Creativity. In the 80s, the Cultural Center faced difficult times, but the local community gave support in its reactivation. The building was renovated based on a project signed by Antonio Eustáquio, subsidized by the Mokiti Okada Foundation. It was re-inaugurated on September 13, 1993. Simultaneously, it received its current name, a tribute to the singer Renato Russo (1960-1996), the former member of the musical group Legião Urbana, nationally known in Brazil.

The Renato Russo Cultural Center comprises the Galpão Theater, a multipurpose room, a video room, a movie theater, a shed for workshops, a library, a mezzanine, a laboratory and administrative offices.

Since December 20, 2013, the Cultural Center has been closed due to its poor physical conditions. The list of problems is substantial: cracks, exposed wires, damaged doors, and lack of accessibility, as well as serious inadequacies in hydraulic, electrical and structural parts of the building. Although the situation was informed to the district agencies which are responsible for the place, the Government of the Federal District still hasn't concluded the works announced in 2015, nor reopened the facilities.

A group of Renato Russo fans wants to transform the Renato Russo Cultural Center into a memorial in honor of the musician.
