= Prêmio Al Rio =

- Awarded for: Brazilian comics
- Sponsored by: GeekExpo
- Location: Fortaleza
- Country: Brazil
- First award: 2015
- Final award: 2018

Prêmio Al Rio (Al Rio Award) was a Brazilian award to honor Brazilian comic book artists with prominence in the national and international comics industry. The name was a tribute to the cartoonist of the same name. The laureate artists received trophies of revelation and of regional, national and international prominence.

The award was associated with GeekExpo, then the main geek event in Ceará, whose first edition took place in 2015. Trophies for Al Rio winners were handed out during the event. The last edition of the award took place in 2018, when happened also the last edition of GeekExpo, which was "absorbed" by the Sana Fest event this year.

== Winners ==
2015

- Revelation: Sirlanney
- Regional Prominence: Mino
- National Prominence: Adão Iturrusgarai
- International Prominence: Cris Peter

2016

- Revelation: Talles Rodrigues
- Regional Prominence: Daniel Brandão
- National Prominence: Lu Cafaggi
- International Prominence: Ed Benes

2017

- Revelation: Blenda Furtado
- Regional Prominence: Geraldo Jesuíno
- National Prominence: Vitor Cafaggi
- International Prominence: Geraldo Borges

2018

- Revelation: Ise Nishi
- Regional Prominence: JJ Marreiro
- National Prominence: Fabio Coala
- International Prominence: Dijjo Lima
