= Galerie Richard =

Contemporary art gallery

Galerie Richard is an international art gallery that specializes in contemporary art founded in 1989 by Jean-Luc and Takako Richard. It is located in Paris at 74, rue de Turenne. The gallery represents emerging and established artists from various countries with an emphasis and how digital art connects to painting. It is a member of the Professional Committee of Art Galleries and participates in international art fairs. It also publishes a collection of monographs on various artists and their work.

== History ==
Jean-Luc and Takako Richard opened their first gallery in September 1989 under the name of Galerie OZ in the Bastille area of Paris. Galerie Oz first promoted new digital art with Vera Molnar and Artus Pixel. Galerie OZ established its reputation by bringing together New York New Wave artists such as Arch Connelly, Rhonda Zwillinger, Christopher Tanner, Pepon Osorio, for the first time in Paris. Galerie OZ also represented Robert Groborne, Milan Kunc, Joost Van den Toorn, Robert Kushner, Choi Jeong Hwa, Attila Richard Lukacs, Christophe Avella-Bagur, Stefan Hoenerloh, Laszlo Feher and Rainer Gross. Additionally, Galerie OZ exhibited photographers such as Erwin Olaf, Bae Bien-u, and Jacqueline Hassink.

In 2002, the gallery moved to Île Saint-Louis and adopted the new name of Galerie Jean-Luc & Takako Richard as well as a new exhibition program that focused on new painting at a time when painting was considered dead. The gallery mostly organized solo shows with artists Shirley Kaneda, Paul Henry Ramirez, Tim Bavington, Carl Fudge, Kiyoshi Nakagami, Adam Ross, Beverly Fishman, Yuichi Higashionna, Alice Stepanek & Steven Maslin, Christoph Wedding and Scott Anderson.

In 2006, the gallery moved to its current Parisian location at 74, rue de Turenne in The Marais. In 2007, the gallery doubled its space size to a 400-square-meter exhibition space there and added the following artists: Benjamin Edwards, Pedro Barbeito, Sven-Ole Frahm, Joseph Nechvatal and Marcus Sendlinger. The gallery also exhibited established artists like Frank Stella, Bram Bogart, Ron Gorchov, Alain Kirili and Judy Pfaff. In the exhibition The Incomplete - Paris the gallery featured 28 artists collected by Hubert Neumann.

Before closing the New York Gallery in 2021 during the COVID-19 epidemic, in 2011, Galerie Richard opened a gallery in Chelsea, Manhattan. On this date, the gallery name was changed to Galerie Richard. Takesada Matsutani had a retrospective exhibition in Paris in 2012 and his first solo and first retrospective exhibition in New York in 2013 during the Solomon R. Guggenheim Museum's Gutai Art Association exhibition. In addition to Olaf Rauh, the gallery developed a program with figurative digital photography including Dionisio González from 2012, Yang Yi from 2013, Lauren Marsolier from 2014, and Li Wei from 2015. Peter Rogiers, William Bradley, and Norio Imai joined the gallery. Galerie Richard organized the Norio Imai retrospective exhibitions in New York in 2014 and in Paris in 2015 and in 2014 Galerie Richard celebrated a 25th anniversary by organizing an extensive exhibition of 40 exhibited artists. The same year the gallery presented a provocative duo show John Armleder - Jean Carzou in New York, Paris and at the Untitled Art fair in Miami.

In 2015 the New York gallery moved to 121 Orchard Street on The Lower East Side before closing there in 2021. Artists shown there include Bram Bogart, Stefan Hoenerloh, Joseph Nechvatal and Li Wei.
