= Viral symphOny =

Electronic noise music symphony

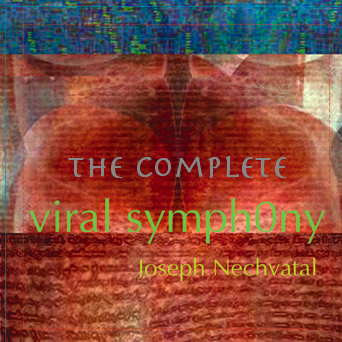
Full viral symphOny cover: art by Joseph Nechvatal

viral symphOny is a collaborative electronic noise music symphony created by the postconceptual artist Joseph Nechvatal. It was created between the years 2006 and 2008 using custom artificial life C++ software based on the viral phenomenon model. It is 1 hour and 40 minutes in length. The first movement of viral symphOny - and raw viral field material - was released in 2006 as a CD by The Institute for Electronic Arts in Alfred, New York. A low resolution extract from the pOstmOrtem section of viral symphOny was published in NME (The New Musical Express) magazine.

== Awards and acknowledgements ==
- January 2009 viral symphOny was selected by artist/musician James Hoff for inclusion into UbuWeb's Top Ten
- viral symphOny was chosen as prize winner at the 9th Festival Internacional de Investigación Artística de Valencia, After The Net, 5–29 June 2008, Valencia, Spain
- viral symphOny was voted #2 in the top ten at free103.9 radio in 2007
- SoundLAB VI selected artist: Joseph Nechvatal

== Movements ==
- Movement 1 : the enthrOning (28.10 min)
- Joseph Nechvatal : original concept viral structures
- Matthew Underwood : nano, micro, meso and macro structures
- Andrew Deutsch : meso and macro structures
- Stephane Sikora : C++ programming
- Steven Mygind Pedersen : IEA project technician
- Movement 2 : murmuring tOngue Of Ovid (20.53 min)
- Joseph Nechvatal : original concept, viral structures, & synthesizer
- Matthew Underwood : nano, micro, meso and macro structures
- Stephane Sikora : C++ viral programming
- Ovid's Metamorphoses : text
- Jane Lawrence Smith : voice
- Movement 3 : pastOral pleasures (12.08 min)
- Joseph Nechvatal : original concept, viral structures, and text
- Matthew Underwood : nano, micro, meso and macro structures
- Stephane Sikora : C++ programming
- Movement 4 : viractual terminate (10.10)
- Joseph Nechvatal : original mix concept
- Matthew Underwood : nano, micro, meso and macro structures
- Andrew Deutsch : meso and macro structures
- Stephane Sikora : C++ programming
- Kevin Harkins: orchestration for percussion, didgeridoo, piano, violin and strings
- pOstmOrtem (28:10)
- Joseph Nechvatal : original mix concept
- Matthew Underwood : nano, micro, meso and macro structures
- Andrew Deutsch meso and macro structures
- Stephane Sikora : C++ programming
- Kevin Harkins: orchestration for String Section (Violins, Cello and Bass), Dijeridoo, E-pad (sort of harmonium-ish) Air Pizz (hammered calliope, sometimes including the hammered operator), Grand Piano, Orchestral Percussion Section, English Horn, Bassoon, Harp and Horn Section (French Horns, Trumpets, Trombone)

== Performance history ==
- July 2, 2021 (7pm) Cramer Âû Florian played on Radio WORM Rotterdam the complete viral symphOny
- On June 23, 2020 Harvestworks broadcast the 28.10 min Movement 1 : the enthrOning from the viral symphOny CD on Twitch.tv, with an excerpt introduction from a 2009 video interview of Joseph Nechvatal with Anthony Masterson.
- On June 6, 2020, Wave Farm Radio WGXC 90.7-FM broadcast the complete viral symphOny from 10pm-11:59pm, and subsequently archived the broadcast.
- In May 2020, White Page Gallery at Fuori Visioni art center in Piacenza Italy exhibited the first movement of viral symphOny online with a digital animation. Piacenza is one of the Northern Italian cities that had the world's largest coronavirus outbreaks.
- On October 3, 2013, Gen Ken Montgomery performed and recorded 3 pOstmOrtems (for Robert Rauschenberg) - an adaptation of the last movement from viral symphOny - as part of his Generator Sound Art exhibition held at Audio Visual Arts gallery (AVA) in New York City.
- viral symphOny was re-mastered into 5.1 surround sound and presented by Joseph Nechvatal as an immersive concert on April 12, 2012, at Harvestworks in New York City.
- The complete viral symphOny was performed as the soundtrack to a digital art projection by Joseph Nechvatal on April 28, 2012, at Galerie Richard in New York.
- The complete viral symphOny was performed at Diapason at 882 Third Avenue, Brooklyn, New York on Friday February 13, 2009.
- In 2010, the first three movements of viral symphOny were net broadcast by WebSYNradio four times a day from September 30 to October 7.
- In 2010, viral symphOny was web cast in its entirety as part of the W2F Festival.
- Viral Concerto by Rhys Chatham (based on the viral symphOny) was performed at Galerie Richard Paris on September 26, 2010.
- The complete viral symphOny was performed as the soundtrack to a digital art projection by Joseph Nechvatal on September 26, 2010, at Galerie Richard in Paris.
- In 2008 viral symphOny was uploaded to archive.org and made downloadable for free by Joseph Nechvatal. Included here is an extensive music review of viral symphOny by Laurent Fairon from the Continuo music blog.

== Orlando et la tempête viral symphOny redux suite ==
In 2020, Joseph Nechvatal and Andrew Deutsch went back to virus-modelled audio material unused in the creation of viral symphOny and reworked it into the Orlando et la tempête viral symphOny redux suite by also integrating an anonymous reading of the novel Orlando, written by Virginia Woolf in 1928. Orlando et la tempête viral symphOny redux suite was created in connection with Joseph Nechvatal's art exhibition Orlando et la tempête, held in the Fall of 2020 at Galerie Richard Paris and was broadcast and archived on January 16, 2021, at 4pm on WGXC 90.7-FM: Radio for Open Ears.

Orlando et la tempête viral symphOny redux suite is one of the two LP vinyl records that make up Nechvatal's 2022 release The Viral Tempest on Pentiments Records. The other being pour finir avec le jugement de dieu viral symphOny plague.

In 2024 an audio art installation was created by Nechvatal mixing the two LPs called Le mariage d’Orlando et Artaud, même at La Générale Nord-Est: Laboratoire artistique politique et social in Paris.

Tracklist:

- 1. wOOlf wOrdings Of OrlandO
- 2. OrlandO et la tempête viral symphOny redux
- 3. rampage at the capitOl OrlandO viral tempest
- 4. OrlandO shOegazer strides tOwards fiascO
- 5. slOw OrlandO Of cOntestatiOn and decOmpOsitiOn
- 6. OrlandO undOne by scOrnful dOg star

== Selected Sound Works (1981-2021) ==
In 2021, a retrospective of Joseph Nechvatal's sound art, that included multiple aspects of viral symphOny, was produced by Pentiments Records as a 28 track 60minute audio cassette with digital download at Bandcamp with Liner Notes by Laurent Fairon. It was released on October 15, 2021.

Tracklist:

- 1. Crown of Thorns (1981)
- 2. Ego Masher (1983)
- 3. Announcing Tellus Audio Cassette Magazine Party at Paradise Garage (1983)
- 4. chOke (1983)
- 5. Excerpt from Sleep (1983)
- 6. Excerpt I from Reckless (1984)
- 7. Excerpt II from Reckless (1984)
- 8. Dalychtocracy (1985)
- 9. Excerpt from Absurd (1985)
- 10. mOther :: Excerpt from Absurd (1985)
- 11. Excerpt from TRUE and FALSE (1985)
- 12. How to Kill (1986)
- 13. Psychedelic Hermeneutic (1988)
- 14. Excerpt from Information Noise Culture (1990)
- 15. Excerpt from Endless Entertainment (1990)
- 16. cOre (2000)
- 17. rainOnme (2001)
- 18. cOde flOw (2002)
- 19. 13:25, 27 November 2021 (UTC)13:25, 27 November 2021 (UTC)13:25, 27 November 2021 (UTC)~~venus©-~Ñ~vibrator, even 01 (2003)
- 20. Excerpt from viral symphOny (2006)
- 21. degeneratiOns (2006)
- 22. Excerpt from cOncertO viral (2010)
- 23. trail Of tears (2013)
- 24. viral symphOny compressed (2018)
- 25. viral sympOny13:25, 27 November 2021 (UTC)13:25, 27 November 2021 (UTC)~~vibrator, even (2011)
- 26. viral symphOny redux (2020)
- 27. on the defeat of don the con (2020)
- 28. pour finir avec le jugement de dieu viral symphOny plague 1 (2021)

== Recording reference ==
- viral symphOny (first movement only) CD Produced in 2006 at The Institute for Electronic Arts* viral symphOny (28'09") and murmuring tOngue Of Ovid (20:53) web published at UbuWeb
- A three-minute excerpt from viral symphOny was included on Master Cactus, a special edition issue cassette release curated by Gen Ken Montgomery Cassette
