= Ilona Granet =

American artist

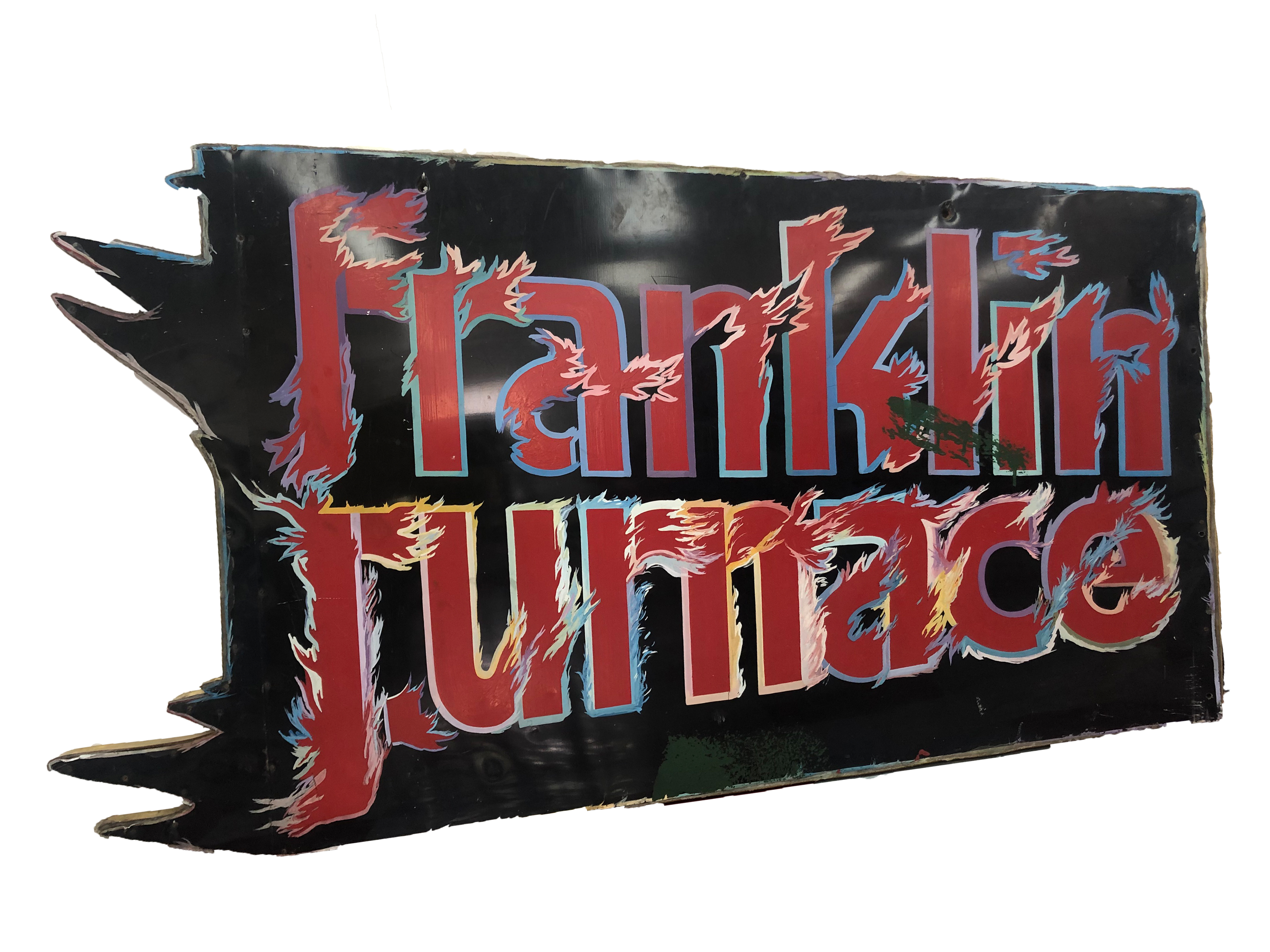
Created and hung through 1980 to 1985 for Franklin Furnace Archive, Inc.

Ilona Granet (born 1948) is a contemporary American artist. Granet is known for her works, which stem from her experience as a sign painter. As a feminist, she has collaborated with local communities and the New York City Department of Transportation for her most renowned works, which addressed women's safety in the streets. Her work is included in the collections of the Whitney Museum of American Art and the Pennsylvania Academy of the Fine Arts. She also appeared in the 1984 Super 8 film Cave Girls, starring Kiki Smith and Ellen Cooper.
