= Jane Lawrence =

American actress (1915–2005)

- Lawrence in 1944
- Born: Jane Brotherton; February 3, 1915; Bozeman, Montana, U.S.
- Died: August 5, 2005 (aged 90); New York City, U.S.
- Occupations: Actress, opera singer
- Spouse: Tony Smith
- Children: 3, including Kiki Smith and Seton Smith

Jane Lawrence Smith (February 3, 1915 – August 5, 2005), born Jane Brotherton, was an American actress and opera singer who was part of the New York art scene beginning in the 1950s.

== Life and work ==
Jane Brotherton was born in Bozeman, Montana, and grew up in Mount Vernon, Washington. Her father was Lawrence Langham Brotherton, a founder of the Bozeman Canning Company. She attended Mount Vernon High School and the University of Washington School of Drama.

In 1943 she, created the small role of Gertie in Oklahoma! on Broadway. The same year, she married Tony Smith, an architect who later achieved fame as a minimalist sculptor. Her close friend Tennessee Williams was best man at her wedding. The Smiths became the parents of three daughters, Kiki Smith, Seton Smith and Beatrice (Bebe) Smith Robinson.

She performed the lead role in the no wave opera XS: The Opera Opus (1984-6) that was created by composer Rhys Chatham and artist Joseph Nechvatal.

Her only film role was that of Clementine Brown in Sailor's Holiday (1944) opposite Arthur Lake and Shelley Winters and in which she was credited as June Lawrence.

She died at age of 90 on August 5, 2005, at her home in Greenwich Village, NY.

== Broadway appearances ==
- Oklahoma! (1943) as Gertie Cummings (opening night cast)
- Inside U.S.A. (1948) in multiple roles (opening night cast)
- Where's Charley? (1948) as Donna Lucia D'Alvadorez (opening night cast)
