= 8BC =

1980s Manhattan nightclub

- 8BC Gallery, exterior view, 1984, from the Archives of American Art
- Interactive map of 8BC
- Location: Manhattan, New York, U.S.
- Coordinates: 40°43′39″N 73°59′09″W
- Owner: Cornelius Conboy; Dennis Gattra
- Type: Nightclub, Art gallery
- Events: Punk; Contemporary art

Construction
- Opened: October 31, 1983
- Closed: October 22, 1985

8BC was a nightclub, performance art and music concert space, and art gallery located at 337 East 8th Street in the East Village neighborhood of New York City. Founded in 1983, the space closed in late 1985.

== History ==
In 1980, co-founder Cornelius Conboy purchased the building with the intention of opening a theatre. During his time working on Theatre Row, Conboy became aware of the lack of experimental performance support in the area. He came across the space, a former farmhouse, in an area of the East Village described as "Little Dresden" due to the large quantity of burnt out and abandoned buildings. He intended the facility as a casual performance-oriented club space rather than a formal theater. His partner in the venture was Dennis Gattra, a member of a traveling circus and road manager for The Flying Karamazov Brothers.

The space opened on October 31, 1983, with Ucci's Circus Romanus, a four-hour variety show. The small space had a capacity of 200 people and a very large stage, which was longer than the main room of the club, and allowed for large performances. Large murals decorated the exterior and interior, and rotating exhibitions were held showcasing local and regional artists. The space relied solely on cover charges and bar sales, paying its performers a percentage of the admission revenues. 8BC was awarded a Bessie Award for its contributions to the local art community in 1985.

Having never obtained a certificate of occupancy to operate and violating zoning regulations for the neighborhood, the space closed on October 22, 1985, by agreement with the New York City Department of Buildings. A few days after the closing, a front-page article in The New York Times about the demise of 8BC and several other East Village clubs and performance spaces speculated that an era of small downtown New York clubs was being eclipsed by larger enterprises such as Palladium, The Limelight and Area. In 2000, Conboy donated his materials related to 8BC to the Archives of American Art.

== Performers ==
During its first year the space showcased over 650 performances ranging from punk rock and no wave bands to cultural performances such as Japanese Butoh. Notable performers included Karen Finley, Steve Buscemi, John Zorn, They Might Be Giants, Leisure Class, Ethyl Eichelberger, Holly Hughes, Charles Busch, Raging Slab, Rhys Chatham's XS: The Opera Opus, and k.d. lang.

== In popular culture ==
8BC is mentioned in the song "La Vie Bohème" in the musical Rent.
