= Leisure Class (band) =

American rock band

Leisure Class is an American rock band. Formed in Detroit in 1977 as Mr. Unique & the Leisure Suits, the band got their start as the opening act for The Mumps (featuring Lance Loud) and local favorites like Flirt and Destroy All Monsters. They released their debut record, the four-song EP, "Mr. Unique & the Leisure Class" in 1983. Dennis Loren, reviewing it in the Metro Times, found "something to offend everyone".

The band moved to New York City in 1984 and made their debut at CBGB. They also played at 8BC, SNAFU, the Henry Street Settlement, The Kitchen, the Gas Station, the Lone Star Roadhouse, Under Acme, Woody's, Beowulf, and Tramps. Their performances featured, at various times, writer Herbert Huncke, impaled goat heads, and a two-story prison (designed and built by conceptual artist and photographer Misha Gordin).

The limited edition two-CD compilation, Leisure Class Recordings 1979–1994 was released in 2004. The following year, Leisure Class was profiled on the National Public Radio show, Day to Day. Lead singer and lyricist Dimitri Mugianis was the subject of the 2009 documentary film by Michel Negroponte, I'm Dangerous With Love. The 2010 compilation Parents Night at the Leper Colony was called "a splendid one hour introduction to this criminally overlooked band".

== Lineups ==
=== 1977–1978 ===
- Dimitri Mugianis – Vocals
- Glenn Johnson (Wild Man Fischer) – Drums, Vocals
- Jeff Mullins – Guitar
- Brian Garwood – Bass
- Ted Moniak (Kevin Renick, Randy Herman and the Sceptre of Benevolence) – Mandolin, Guitar, Vocals

=== 1978–1979 ===
- Dimitri Mugianis – Vocals
- Glenn Johnson – Drums, Organ, Vocals
- James Myers – Guitar, Bass
- Dave Rice (Algebra Mothers, L-Seven, The Blind) – Guitar, Bass
- Ted Moniak – Mandolin, Vocals

=== 1979–1980 ===
- Dimitri Mugianis – Vocals
- Glenn Johnson – Drums, Vocals
- Howard Glazer aka John E. Louder – Guitar
- Bob Godwin aka Scotch Hiballs – Bass

=== 1981 ===
- Dimitri Mugianis – Vocals
- Glenn Johnson – Drums, Percussion, Piano, Vocals
- Dan Porvin – Guitar
- Michael Tudor aka Sal Monella – Guitar
- Greg Gilmore – Bass
- Dan Matuszczak aka Matthew J. Karp – Saxes, Flute, Bass Clarinet
- Stan Johnson – Trumpet

=== 1981–1983 ===
- Dimitri Mugianis – Vocals
- Glenn Johnson – Drums, Percussion, Piano, Organ, Harmonica, Tin Whistle, Vocals
- Dan Porvin – Guitar
- Michael Tudor aka Sal Monella – Guitar
- Chris McGorey (Dog Latin) – Bass
- Dan Matuszczak aka Matthew J. Karp – Saxes, Flute, Bass Clarinet
- Stan Johnson – Trumpet
- Guy Zublin – Trumpet

=== 1984–1989 ===
- Dimitri Mugianis – Vocals
- Glenn Johnson – Drums, Percussion, Piano, Organ, Synthesizers, Tin Whistle
- Dan Porvin – Guitar
- Sal Monella (Michael Tudor) – Guitar
- Marc Dannenhirsch – Guitar
- Chris Hunt – Guitar
- Dave Boonshoft (John Phillips, Naked Music, Aguilar Amplification) – Bass
- Ric Frank (Jambalaya Brass Band) – Tenor Sax and Flute
- Mike Walters – Tenor Sax and Flute
- J. J. Silva (Ten Wheel Drive) – Trumpet, Trombone
- Leonard Belota – Trumpet
- Leif Arntzen – Trumpet
- Pat McCarty – Trombone
- Paul Romero – Vocals
- Kevin Weist (The Lemmings, The Groove Barbers) – Vocals
- Melissa Schaffer – Vocals
- David Lawton – Vocals

=== 1990–1995 ===
- Dimitri Mugianis – Vocals
- Glenn Johnson – Drums, Percussion
- Dan Porvin – Guitar
- Al Korosy (Dion) – Guitar
- Dave Boonshoft – Bass
- Bob Marx – Tenor Sax and Flute
- Russ Johnson – Trumpet
- Pat McCarty – Trombone
- Paul Romero – Vocals
- Kevin Weist – Vocals
- David Lawton – Vocals
- Angel Jemmott (Angela on Sesame Street) – Vocals

== Discography ==
- Mr. Unique and the Leisure Class (Leisureco LC 1) 1983
- Leisure Class Recordings 1979–1994 (Leisureco LC 002) 2004
- We Went and Recorded It Anyway: The Best of Pop-Punk and Power Pop 1977–84 (Brutarian: BRUT CD-009) 2009
- Parents Night at the Leper Colony (Leisureco LC 003) 2010
