= XS: The Opera Opus =

1980s American no wave avant-garde music and art performance

XS the Opera: Shakespeare Theatre, Boston

XS: The Opera Opus was a no wave avant-garde music and art performance created by Rhys Chatham and Joseph Nechvatal in the mid 1980s. Jane Lawrence Smith sang the lead role in the Boston performance and Yves Musard danced the main role. Its theme was the excess of the nuclear weapon buildup of the Ronald Reagan presidency.

== XS: The Opera at Shakespeare Theatre, Boston ==
XS: The Opera, Shakespeare Theatre, Boston was the final production and consisted of three soprano singers, 4 trumpets, six electric guitars. bass, drums, 35 mm slide projection and dance. The duration was 90 minutes. Choreography: Yves Musard, 35 mm cross-fade art slides: Joseph Nechvatal

Musicians: Rhys Chatham (conductor) with Pamela Fleming, Steven Haynes, Ben Neill, James O'Connor, David Wonsey, Karen Haglof, Robert Poss, Mitch Salmon, Bill Brovold, Tim Schellenbaum, Conrad Kinard, J.P., Peggy Ackerman, Jane Lawrence Smith, Elly Spiegel.

== Centre Pompidou recognition ==
The history of XS was included with an XS Exemplification sound slideshow in the No Wave art exhibition Who You Staring At?: Visual culture of the no wave scene in the 1970s and 1980s at Centre Pompidou in Paris in 2023. A video documenting the Centre Pompidou, Paris March 8th, 2023 event XS: The Opera Opus: An Operatic Transvaluation of No Wave Aesthetics by Joseph Nechvatal and Rhys Chatham was held and has been published online at the Centre Pompidou website.

== Performance history ==
XS: The Opera performance at the XS the Pyramid Club 1984

- 1986
- XS: The Opera, Shakespeare Theatre, Boston
- 1985
- XS: Night of Power, 8BC, New York, NY
- XS: Night of Power: art installation, Quando, New York, NY
- XS: art installation, Gray Art Gallery, East Carolina University
- 1984
- XS: The Opera Opus, Pyramid Club, New York, NY
- XS: The Opera Opus, Club Danceteria, New York, NY
- XS: The Opera Opus, 8BC, New York, NY
- XS: The Opera Opus, Elaine Dannheisser Foundation, New York, NY

== See also ==
- Post-punk
- Postminimalism
- Campaign for Nuclear Disarmament
- No wave
- Opera
