= Seton Smith =

American artist

- Born: 1955 (age 70–71); Newark, New Jersey, U.S.
- Known for: Photography, installation art

Seton Smith (born 1955) is an American artist photographer.

== Early life and education ==
Smith was born in 1955 in Newark, New Jersey. Her father was artist Tony Smith and her mother was actress and opera singer Jane Lawrence. Although Seton's work takes a very different form than that of her father, early exposure to his process of making geometric sculptures allowed her to experience minimalist and formal issues in art firsthand. She had a twin sister who died of AIDS, actor Beatrice "Bebe" Smith, and is also the sister of Kiki Smith, who is also an artist.

Seton Smith went to public school in South Orange, New Jersey. She subsequently attended Sarah Lawrence and Bennington College, moving to New York City in 1979

== Public collections ==
Smith is in the collections of the International Center of Photography, New York, George Pompidou Center, Paris; The Whitney Museum of American Art, New York; Los Angeles County Museum, L.A.; the Musee d’Art Moderne de la Ville de Paris
