= Beverly Fishman =

American painter and sculptor

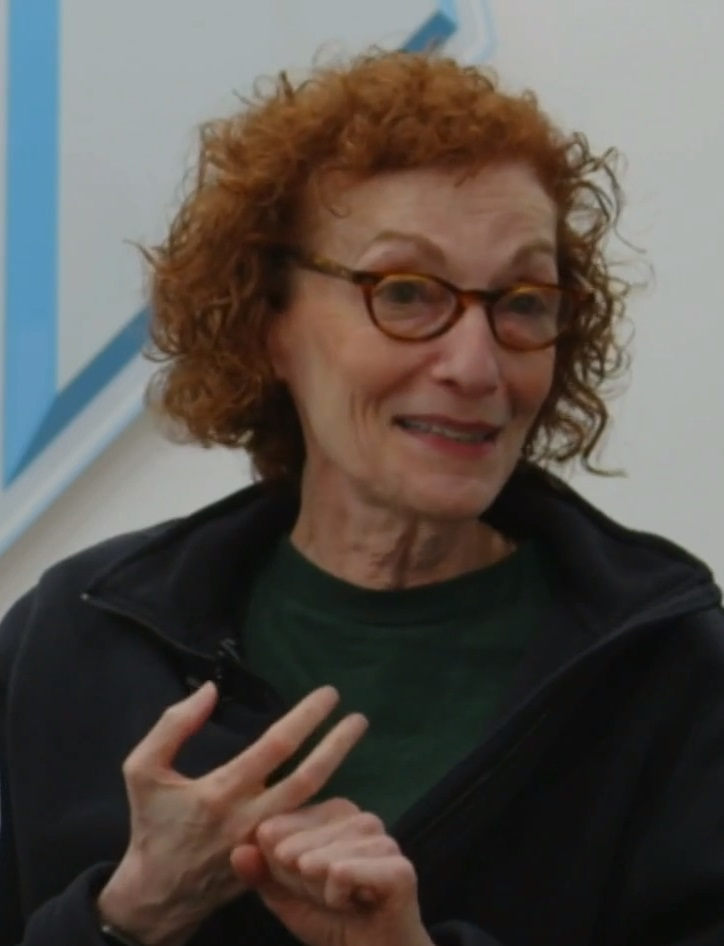
- Beverly Fishman at the Contemporary Dayton, Ohio, 2023.
- Born: 1955 (age 70–71); Philadelphia, Pennsylvania
- Education: Philadelphia College of Art (BFA), Yale University (MFA)
- Known for: painting
- Awards: Anonymous Was a Woman; Guggenheim Fellowship (2005)

Beverly Fishman (born 1955, Philadelphia, Pennsylvania) is an American painter and sculptor whose work explores science, medicine, and the body. She is a Guggenheim Fellow, a National Academy of Design Academician, an Anonymous Was a Woman awardee, and was Artist-in-Residence at Cranbrook Academy of Art between 1992 and 2019, where she was Head of the Painting Department. Although best known for her painted reliefs based on the forms of drugs and pharmaceuticals, Fishman has consistently worked in multiple media, such as cast-resin and glass sculpture, as well as silkscreen painting on metal, large-scale wall painting, and outdoor murals. While Fishman's artworks often look abstract, they are based on appropriated shapes, patterns, and images drawn from the pharmaceutical and illicit drug industries as well as multiple forms of scientific and medical imaging. As she noted in 2017, "Although they look abstract, my paintings are tied to problems like attention-deficit disorder, opioid addiction, anxiety, and depression. Their forms connect them to the social problems of today."

== Early life and education ==
Beverly Fishman was born in Pennsylvania where she pursued painting from an early age. She received her BFA in 1977 from the Philadelphia College of Art, where she studied with Ree Morton, and her MFA in 1980 from Yale University, where she worked with Elizabeth Murray, Mel Bochner, and Judy Pfaff.

== Work of the 1980s ==
While at Yale, Fishman began to explore sculpture, an investigation that occupied her intensely for the first half of the 1980s. Made of burlap, plaster, plastic, chicken wire, rope, and various types of paint, Fishman's sculptures resembled violently disassembled bodies, referencing the history of post-minimalism as well as contemporaneous feminist critiques of the patriarchal view of women as primarily corporeal and abject. As Fishman later recalled, "Looking at anatomy books and everything under the skin, I was interested in the body as viscera. I created large, abject sculptures that showed human beings as internal, biological, and centered in the flesh. I was interested not in what we looked like externally but in what we were as material, chemical, and electrical organisms. As a feminist, I was also highly aware of how society tried to reduce women to physical and emotional characteristics. In part, my sculptures were a way to highlight and subvert those readings of women as (mere) bodies." Working generatively (using earlier artworks as the starting point for new ones), Fishman began to make large-scale drawings based on the sculptures, reimagining her organic forms and socially-critical concepts in a new medium. In particular, these expressionistically-rendered, brightly-colored pastel "bodyscapes," which Fishman pursued between 1985 and 1987, were constructed so as to undermine distinctions between inside and outside worlds.

During the late 1980s, Fishman switched processes again and began to create mixed-media paintings on wood that incorporated collage elements made with photocopier machines. "Appropriating and abstracting images of [human] cells, I sought to link the reproduction of images to mutation and biological development. Living in New York during the AIDS crisis, I was aware of how a virus could define one’s identity. I wanted to represent the body while engaging with the technologies through which our interiors were visualized and reproduced." As a result of this focus technologically-mediated vision and the parallels between organic and technological forms of reproduction, the shapes of Fishman's mixed-media paintings began to morph, referencing the history of the shaped canvas, while mimicking the forms of microscopes, telescopes, and petri dishes.

== Work of the 1990s ==
In the early 1990s, Fishman began to mix appropriated images of stars and nebulae with her cellular imagery to suggest more analogies between the body and space, micro- and macrocosm. These tondo-shaped canvases culminated in large-scale installations like Intervention at the Detroit Institute of Arts in 1995, which incorporated the DIA’s great entrance hall—lined with vitrines containing medieval armor—to evoke questions about how human beings continuously change their identities through science and technology. In the mid-1990s, Fishman began creating installations of cell-like modules consisting of photo-collage, acrylic, and resin. Referencing post-minimalism, feminism, and commodity art, she explored shaped module as a mixture of appropriated and hand-painted elements, while simultaneously using grid-like installations to present the body as commodity as well as to destabilize oppositions between biological and technological modes of reproduction. New forms of cluster paintings emerged in the late 1990s, in which up to 100 elements were combined into single, multi-component works. Suggesting organic development, mutability, and transformation, these cluster paintings engaged with the history of the shaped canvas as well as multiple traditions of representation and abstraction in contemporary art.

== Work of the 2000s ==
In the early 2000s, Fishman diversified her artistic practice still further. “Around 2000 I turned from an image bank evoking disease to one that visualized pharmaceutical cures. Using cast resin with pigment, I created new forms of cluster paintings: sculptural works that hung on the wall and that further undermined distinctions between painting, sculpture, installation, and environment. The early resin clusters appropriated the shapes of pills in order to raise questions about our stereotypes of sickness and health, normal and abnormal. The clusters in turn evolved into glow-in-the- dark pharmaceutical installations that explored color and form as they changed under different environmental conditions. Appropriated images of ecstasy pills, which revealed the designing and branding of illegal drugs, became part of the mix in 2007.” Also in the early 2000s, Fishman began to create modular metal paintings that combined different scientific and medical representations of the body—sound waves, molecules, DNA helixes, and EKG and EEG patterns—with the logos of different pharmaceutical brands, like Valium and Haldol. Initially, these paintings were made by collaging industrial sign-vinyl onto powder-coated aluminum rectangles, but in 2008, Fishman began screen-printing multiple layers of enamel on polished stainless steel, creating a quasi-reflective surface that incorporated both viewers and the environment. Introducing additional trace representational elements culled from circuit diagrams, Bar and QR codes, and DNA notation, Fishman’s paintings enveloped and refracted their audiences, representing them as if on multiple screens. Suggesting that we are constantly being quantified by different forms of scientific and commercial imaging, they radiated ambivalence about technology and in particular the medical and pharmaceutical industries.

== Work of the 2010s ==
In 2011, Fishman debuted her first Pill Spill at the Toledo Museum of Art’s Glass Pavilion. Part of a series she began in 2010, Fishman’s Pill Spills are large, floor-based installations composed of 80 to 120 blown-glass capsules, each six to fifteen inches in length, rendered in vivid color and articulated with moiré patterns. Installed in the Pavilion’s curved glass hollows along the façade and lobby, Fishman’s initial Pill Spill treated the building, which was designed by Tokyo-based SANAA, Ltd., as a living organism—an architectural body into which pharmaceuticals were released. A slightly smaller reconfigured iteration of Pill Spill was installed at the Detroit Institute of Arts in 2011, and then a new, more formally complex spill, Artificial Paradise, a reference to Les Paradis Artificiels (1860), Charles Baudelaire's book about opium and hashish intoxication, appeared at Wasserman Projects in Detroit in 2013.

For Fishman, the two-part capsule served as both a symbol of medicine’s paradoxes and a vehicle for abstraction, generating endless permutations of color and pattern. As critics noted, the Pill Spills evoke the idea of medicine as pharmakon—both poison and cure—a concept first articulated in Plato’s Phaedrus and later elaborated by Jacques Derrida in “Plato’s Pharmacy” to signify the unstable duality of substances, images, and technologies as simultaneously remedial and toxic. By invoking the pharmakon, Fishman underscored the ambivalence of pharmaceutical culture and its oscillation between healing and harm. Fragile yet substantial, these glass forms—scattered and accumulated on the floor—challenged the preciousness of their material while dissolving boundaries between interior and exterior, consciousness and the unconscious. Fishman later extended the series by adding glass tablets and placing capsules in vitrines or “pillboxes,” evoking luxury product displays and bespoke “drug cocktails” for collectors. For Fishman, science and medicine represent humanity’s highest yet most ambivalent achievements—life-saving, terrifying, and creative at once. In transforming the capsule into a medium rather than a subject of art, Pill Spill asked what it means when a form of technological healing becomes a site of aesthetic and philosophical reflection.

In 2012, informed by sustained research into the design strategies of pharmaceutical corporations, generic manufacturers, and producers of illicit drugs, Beverly Fishman initiated the series of polychrome reliefs in wood and urethane paint for which she has since become best known. These meticulously fabricated wall works—ranging in scale from approximately twenty-five inches to fifteen feet—translate the formal and chromatic vocabularies of prescription pharmaceuticals into the language of contemporary abstraction. While the earliest examples isolated the image of a single pill, Fishman’s subsequent reliefs combined enlarged fragments of capsules and tablets into increasingly complex compositional structures. The resulting configurations evoke the pharmacological “cocktail” and the condition of polypharmacy: the simultaneous consumption of multiple medications. Although especially prevalent among older adults, polypharmacy has become a widespread feature of modern life across age groups, emblematic of a culture in which chemical enhancement and dependence are mutually constitutive.

In a related body of work, Fishman appropriated the distinctive silhouettes of ecstasy tablets, exposing how the illicit drug market deploys the visual logics of corporate branding—logos, icons, and cartoon imagery—to market illegal substances and cultivate consumer loyalty. By situating these forms within the lineage of Pop art, she reveals the porous boundary between the aesthetics of counterculture and those of advanced capitalism.

Formally, Fishman’s reliefs stage a dynamic interplay between glossy and matte surfaces. Their chromatic range—derived in part from the spectrum of human skin tones and in part from the synthetic palette of technological and industrial production—project an aura of both seduction and control. The beveled edges of the works, which extend slightly from the wall, generate radiant halos that appear to animate the reliefs from within. In doing so, they blur the conventional boundaries between painting, sculpture, and architectural space, producing an environment charged with optical and affective intensity.

As Fishman herself has noted, these works “explore our contemporary global condition in which drugs construct and contest our identities, and in which the production and consumption of art can seem like an addiction.” By mobilizing strategies of appropriation and bodily reference, she reconfigures the legacies of geometric and hard-edge abstraction and Pop art to address the pharmacological dimensions of subjectivity in late capitalism. The resulting objects operate simultaneously as seductive surfaces and critical propositions—reflecting on the intertwined promises and dangers of pharmaceutical culture, and on the pervasive influence of both legal and illicit drugs in shaping the psychic, aesthetic, and material contours of contemporary existence.

== Exhibitions ==
In 1986 her art was in the show Sydney Blum/Petah Coyne/Beverly Fishman at P.S. 122, New York. In 2002 she had a solo show at Galerie Jean-Luc & Takako Richard, the gallery which was formerly known as Gallery Oz and subsequently known as Galerie Richard. Her solo show Focus: Beverly Fishman was featured at the Eli and Edythe Broad Art Museum at Michigan State University. The exhibition Beverly Fishman: Dose, curated by Nick Cave was exhibited in 2017. In 2018 she exhibited Chemical Sublime at Kavi Gupta Gallery in Chicago. In 2019, she exhibited Future Perfect at Kavi Gupta.

In 2020, she exhibited “I Dream of Sleep” at the Miles McEnery Gallery.

== Related publications ==
Fishman's art has been the subject of major reviews by art critics Donald Kuspit and Jason Stopa in Art in America. Dorothy Mayhall published the exhibition catalog for the show Beverly Fishman: Paintings, Drawings and Sculpture, shown November 4 – December 6, 1985 at the Housatonic Museum of Art.

Fishman was interviewed by Leslie Wayne of the online magazine Art Critical about three solo shows: Pain Management at the Library Street Collective in Detroit, Michigan; Another Day in Paradise at the Abroms-Engel Institute for the Visual Arts in Birmingham, Alabama, and Dose, curated by Nick Cave at the CUE Foundation in NYC.

In 2017 Zachary Small reviewed Beverly Fishman: Color Coding Big Pharma for art21 magazine, and she was interviewed by Jason Stopa for Art in America magazine about her abstract art derived from a focus on pill and medication addictions. Stopa wrote that Fishman "creates powerful abstract paintings that address technology and the pharmaceutical industry" and adds, "Fishman is a painter with the concerns of a sculptor, making paintings that require high levels of production. Her studio practice includes manufacturing uniquely shaped supports and consulting with automotive paint specialists to get the background she needs to achieve industrial finishes."

== Awards and honors ==
Fishman was awarded an Anonymous Was A Woman Award in 2018. Fishman received her BFA from Philadelphia College of Art (now the University of the Arts) in 1977. Fishman received her MFA degree from Yale University in 1980. At Yale she studied under Judy Pfaff and Elizabeth Murray. Her work is included in the Hallmark Collection. She was awarded a Guggenheim Fellowship in 2005.
