= Cave Girls =

1984 film

Cave Girls (1982)

Cave Girls is a 1984 New York No Wave underground film by Kiki Smith (co-directed with Ellen Cooper) created on Super 8 between 1981 and 1984. that makes use of Stan Brakhage-like montage cutting.

== Cave girls collective ==
Cave Girls, as an independent film, emerged out of a loose New York City female collective that included Kiki Smith, Ellen Cooper, Cara Brownell, Bush Tetras, Ilona Granet, Marnie Greenholz, Julie Harrison, Becky Howland, Virge Piersol, Judy Ross, Bebe Smith, Teri Slotkin, Y Pants and Sophie VDT. All women appear in the film and in photographic stills.

== Screenings ==
Cara Brownell and Julie Harrison produced a video broadcast of Cave Girls for Colab's artists’ TV series on Manhattan Cable called Potato Wolf. Cave Girls was also shown at the Edinburgh Film Festival.

== Synopsis ==
Partially inspired by the Raquel Welch performance in the 1966 film One Million Years B.C., in the Cave Girls film, young women speak about the idea of cave girls as a defense mechanism against street harassment by men and fantasize about a matriarchal society free of all men. Kiki Smith refers to Cave Girls as an unfinished ersatz documentary, like the 1964 A Hard Day’s Night movie, that starred the Beatles. Conceived as a spoof on the apocalyptic, there are sections of Cave Girls where the women artists talk about how the film is going and how the film concerns the survival of young women and the survival of the very film they are making.

== Music ==
Part of Cave Girls includes Bush Tetras music playing over long passages of out of focus, foggy, visually noisy, action.

== Locations ==
Part of the film was shot in a downtown loft, in the countryside in New Jersey, and at the bombed out looking backyard of ABC No Rio.
