= Dimitri Mobengo Mugianis =

American harm reductionist

Dimitri Mugianis (born August 4, 1962) is a harm reductionist, activist, musician, poet, writer, anarchist, and psychedelic practitioner.

== Early life ==
Dimitri was born in Detroit, Michigan to a politically leftist Greek American family. While still a teenager, Dimitri began writing poetry and songs, and using drugs. The first great artistic and personal influence on his life outside of his family was the late photographer Misha Gordin, with whom he collaborated with on film projects and performances culminating in a special homecoming show at Saint Andrews Hall in Detroit in 1985.

In 1977, Mugianis formed a band with Glenn Johnson called Mr. Unique & the Leisure Suits, later renamed Leisure Class. The band experimented with a very wide range of styles, from punk rock and rock opera to "Weimar oompah," often inciting rage in their audiences.

In 1983, Leisure Class moved to New York City where Dimitri's heroin use increased along with the band's popularity. The Beats were a major influence on him, in terms of both his performance style and his drug use. He became involved with members of the Beat scene, notably Herbert Huncke and Gregory Corso. During this time Dimitri supported himself by working as a bike messenger and a dishwasher. He also worked in the mailroom and loading docks of the publisher Time, Inc., and became a representative for The News Guild of New York, Local 31003 CWA.

In the 1990s, Dimitri moved back to Detroit for a couple of years in an attempt to get clean. He worked at Another Fucking Bar and Heaven, two legendary after-hours clubs in Detroit he ran with his brother.

== Ibogaine ==
While Dimitri was in Detroit, his common law wife died of drug-related causes while pregnant. He moved back to New York City, and by 2002, his daily $150–$200 heroin habit had grown to also including cocaine and 100 mg of methadone. The musician Adam Nodelman was the first to tell Dimitri about ibogaine, a hallucinogen that is the key sacrament in the Central African religion Bwiti, and known to interrupt dependence on opiates without withdrawal—but was illegal in the United States. Dimitri also met Allan Clear, who worked at a syringe access program that provided other harm reduction services to drug users during the early years of the AIDS epidemic, and was a major influence to Dimitri's approach to drug addiction treatment.

In an effort to cease his drug use, Mugianis traveled to the Netherlands for ibogaine treatment. During his ibogaine-induced hallucinations, he saw his Greek ancestors, his own future, and Papa Andre, the Gabonese shaman he would work with later. He then traveled to Icaria, his ancestral homeland on the Aegean Sea. He has not used methadone, heroin, or cocaine since his treatment.

== Life after drugs ==
Inspired to help others in need, Dimitri made plans to become an underground ibogaine provider, focusing on detoxing hardcore addicts. Howard Lotsof, father of the American ibogaine movement and discoverer of its anti-addiction properties, became Dimitri's mentor and friend. In 2005, having already completed hundreds of ibogaine treatments, Dimitri was approached by Michel Negroponte, director of Methadonia, who wanted to document his work with addicts. Negroponte followed Dimitri on his first journey to Gabon to film his initiation into Bwiti, and showed how Dimitri incorporated the spiritual practices of Bwiti into his detox treatments.

In 2006, Mugianis began to critique the commodification of psychedelics and ritual, shifting from advocate to a concerned practitioner with a critical eye—while plant medicines open the mind and spirit, and offer new possibilities by inviting people to reimagine themselves in the world around them, societal structures surrounding that world typically work toward the consolidation of social power and have a negative impact on humanity. These two pathways operate at odds with one another.

In 2009, Mugianis began to change his relationship with Bwiti, distancing himself from its hierarchal structure and rudimentary interpretations of addiction that didn't connect with the complexities of trauma suffered by the addicts he was working with. He stopped focusing exclusively on Ibogaine, re-contextualized his practice, and began incorporating MDMA and psilocybin in his treatments abroad. Moving away from result-oriented, linear ways of healing, he studied sound therapy with Alexandre Tannous, and began to meld his Bwiti ceremonial training in Gabon with what he learned from performing in night clubs for 20 years—to utilize harm reduction as a nonlinear approach to healing, with an ethos of self love and forgiveness. Dimitri's concept of radical hospitality honors the individual and amplifies the self healing instinct that brings people to seek psychedelic medicines to begin with, while reinforcing that there is nothing inherently wrong with the ego. He considers it the antidote to the shaming that often occurs in the psychedelic space around the idea of ego dissolution—or letting the ego die. His mantra to the approach is “there’s no wrong way for one to do this wrong.”

Dimitri was an early member of Voices Of Community Activists & Leaders (VOCAL-NY), a statewide grassroots membership organization that builds power among low-income people affected by HIV/AIDS, the drug war, mass incarceration, and homelessness in order to create healthy and just communities. In 2009, he spoke about the dangers of medicalizing Ibogaine as a panelist of the VOCAL-NY Users Union talk at The international Ibogaine conference in Sayulita Mexico. He was also active during the formation of HRI (Harm Reduction International), a leading NGO dedicated to reducing the negative health, social, and legal impacts of drug use and drug policy. Mugianis has advocated for the human rights of drug users on a global scale, speaking at numerous international conferences.

In 2011, Dimitri and two others were arrested by a DEA task force and accused of arranging an Ibogaine intervention for an addict referred to them by her doctor. The three were represented by legendary civil rights attorney Tony Serra, and after a year-long court battle they were eventually convicted of a misdemeanor drug charge and served 45 days house arrest.

Since 2011, Dimitri has worked at the non-profit organization New York Harm Reduction Educators (NYHRE). Over the course of several years, Mugianis, along with psychotherapist Brian Murphy and acupuncturist Juan Cortez, developed holistic offerings including weekly ritual ceremony, acupuncture, massage, Tai Chi, gong yoga, sound therapy, and nature trips for active drug users, sex workers, the homeless, and previously incarcerated people seeking help—a first-of-its kind program for a vulnerable and socially excluded population.

His work at NYHRE made him a hallmark of harm reduction, a movement many consider integral to improving the state of addiction in the US. Mugianis also continued to work with psychedelics abroad during this time, including an Ibogaine clinic in Costa Rica.

In 2014, Mugianis founded Plant Medicine in Recovery, a mutual aid group composed of people who had used psychedelics and plant medicine to recover from addiction. This group morphed into Psychedelics in Recovery, an International organization that is a 12 step, 12 tradition fellowship, which welcomes members from any 12 step group, regardless of their addictive patterns, and incorporates psychedelics in their recovery process.

Inspired by the Krishnamurti quote, “It is no measure of health to be well adjusted to a profoundly sick society”, Dimitri and Brian Murphy formed the Psychedelic Disintegration support group in 2019, in reaction to the normalization of the psychedelic experience emphasis in psychedelic renaissance that is placed on “integration”.

Art and performance are still remain an important part of Dimitri's life. In August 2020, he participated in the Duende Reading Series at Primitive Grace in NYC, and read an excerpt from the autobiography that he is currently writing.

On August 6, 2021, Mugianis released a public statement on TikTok stating his belief that "when you die your soul goes up onto the roof and stays there for eternity" and that "the soul stays stuck up there until someone knocks it down with a long pole and your new life begins".

== Media interest ==
Dimitri's story and work have been featured in numerous media outlets including the New York Times, Village Voice, Rolling Stone, NPR, VICE News, Salon.com, The Daily Beast, DoubleBlind Magazine, and The Psychedelic Times, and he was the subject of the 2009 documentary “Dangerous with Love '' by Michael Negroponte. I'm Dangerous With Love ran the festival circuit in 2009-2010 and was released on DVD in April 2011. Dimitri is featured in Season 2, Episode 9 of the Crimetown podcast by Gimlet Media.
