= Paul Henry Ramirez =

American contemporary artist

- Born: 1963 (age 62–63); El Paso, Texas, United States
- Known for: Painting, Drawing, Printmaking, Sculpture, Site-specific installation
- Awards: The Aldrich Contemporary Art Museum Emerging Artist Award

Paul Henry Ramirez (born 1963 in El Paso, Texas, U.S.) is an American contemporary artist known for his biomorphic abstractionist paintings. As his figural based paintings evolved to include geometrics, in 2010, Ramirez coined the term "biogeomorphic abstraction" to describe his own bold painting style, a fusion of biomorphic and geometric forms. He also gained notability for his site-specific installations as his paintings began to expand outside the confines of the canvas edges onto the walls of the gallery space. These site-specific installations gradually evolved to encompass the whole gallery space, creating a full environmental experience. Donald Kuspit, scholar and art critic, describes Ramirez as “an important new kind of abstract painter . . . an abstractionist playing with color and form to exciting imaginative effect.”

== Work ==
Ramirez began creating site-specific installations in 1994, combining drawings, paintings, objects, sculpture, music, dance, and furniture in dialogue with architectural space and architectural elements, sometimes in collaboration with sound designers, dance choreographers, costume designers, and furniture designers. His "total environments" are intended to invite viewers to experience in addition to observe, to feel as if “they are coming into the belly of a painting” as they enter his world — his installation. These were first featured in New York City alternative exhibition spaces including the Drawing Center (1994), Clock Tower Gallery (1995) and Franklin Furnace (1995); and at Caren Golden Fine Art, New York (1998).

== Career ==
Ramirez moved from his native Texas to New Jersey in 1985, then to New York City a few years later to design window and interior displays for retailers Henri Bendel, Charivari, and Takashimaya. In 1994, he set up a studio in the Greenpoint neighborhood of Brooklyn, NY, later moving his studio to the Motor Arts Building studio complex at the Grounds For Sculpture, Hamilton, New Jersey. He is represented by Ryan Lee Gallery, New York.

== Collections ==
Ramirez's work can be found in the permanent collections of the Austin Museum of Art, Corcoran Gallery of Art, Crocker Art Museum, El Paso Museum of Art, Hammer Museum, Hirshhorn Museum, Kresge Art Museum, Newark Museum, Smithsonian American Art Museum, Smithsonian’s National Air and Space Museum, Tarble Arts Center, The Hyde Collection, and Whitney Museum of American Art.
