= Shirley Kaneda =

Japanese artist (born 1951)

Shirley Kaneda (born 1951) is an abstract painter and artist based in New York City.

== Early life ==
Shirley Kaneda is an American artist who was born in Tokyo to Korean-born parents. She was educated in English attending The American School in Japan. She came to New York in 1970 to attend Parsons School of Design and has since lived and worked in New York City. She became a naturalized American citizen in 1986.

== Work ==
Shirley Kaneda started exhibiting her work in the late 1980s in New York at such venues as White Columns as well as in the landmark show, Conceptual Abstraction at Sidney Janis Gallery. She has had numerous solo exhibitions both nationally and internationally at such venues as Jack Shainman Gallery, Feigen Contemporary, Danese Gallery and Gallery Richard in New York as well as Mark Moore Gallery in LA, Bernard Jacobson Gallery in London, Annandale Gallery in Sydney, Australia, Raffaella Cortese Gallery in Milan, Galerie Schuster in Germany, Centre d’Art D’Ivry in Paris and Centre d’Art Contemporain in Sete, France, among others.

The critic, Matt Biro has said, “For more than three decades Shirley Kaneda has expanded the possibilities of abstract painting in a number of unique and thought-provoking ways. An artist who pushes the limits of painterly form today, Kaneda is an analytical and historically informed painter. She excels in juxtaposing a wide variety of gestures, shapes, and patterns in a manner that suggests an archaeology of twentieth century modernism.”

In rethinking abstraction, she has focused on two of its greatest deficits—its inherent decorativeness and opticality. "By re-establishing the content of the aesthetic or how it’s addressed, the range of qualities represented by the decorative can be utilized, which appeal primarily to the senses to establish a form of signification for them that will make their content and presence tangible." Furthermore, in discussing her work, she has said, “The idea of regaining art's importance in the area of aesthetics through the decorative is linked to the view that art may still show us a way of intensifying our perception and reflexivity. One of the reasons for constructing my paintings the way I have is that I hope they will hold back automatic responses, disrupting expectations, and pre-conceptions, hopefully connecting the viewer with overlooked or unconscious modes of thought. In my view this can open up the supposedly closed system of abstract painting's subjects and aesthetics. And in terms of how the decorative can be understood metaphorically in my painting, I use it to promote such non-heroic themes as, beauty, fluidity, variation and so on. By exploiting and building on discriminatory concepts, I hope to continue the process of demystifying such traditionally masculine values as the heroic, the aggressive, and the rational.”

Kaneda was a Guggenheim Fellow in 1999, and has received grants from the National Endowment for the Arts, Pollock-Krasner Foundation, the Elizabeth Foundation, as well as The American Academy of Arts and Letters Purchase Award, and CCA Andratx Artist Residency. Her work has been reviewed in various publications such as The New York Times, Art in America, The New Yorker, Art News, Time Out, Contemporary, Art Critical, Huffington Post, Art Issues among many others. Her works are in the collection of such museums as The American University Museum at the Katzen Art Center, Neuberger Museum of Art, Suny Purchase, David Winton Bell Gallery, Brown University, Escalette Collection of Art, Chapman University, Princeton University Art Museum, and Virginia Museum of Fine Arts as well as in many private and corporate collections. She has also written essays and criticism for Arts Magazine, Art Journal, Journal of Contemporary Painting, Women and Performance among others. In 1991, she wrote the essay, “Painting and Its Others, The Feminine in Abstract Painting", for ARTS MAGAZINE which has been anthologized in “PAINTING,” edited by Terry R. Myers, in the series Documents of Contemporary Art, published by White Chapel Gallery and the MIT Press. She has also conducted many interviews for Bomb Magazine since 1991 with artists such as Jonathan Lasker, Philip Taaffe, Valerie Jaudon, Shirley Jaffe, Robert Mangold, Mira Schor, and Charline Von Heyl among others. Kaneda was Asst. Professor at Virginia Commonwealth University as the Thalheimer Faculty Fellow (1999–2001), Associate Professor at Claremont Graduate University (2001–2003), and was tenured Professor of Painting at Pratt Institute in New York from 2003 to 2017.
