= Stefan Hoenerloh =

German painter

- Born: 1960s Karlsruhe, Germany
- Known for: Painting

Stefan Hoenerloh is a contemporary German-born painter of cityscapes. He lives and works in East Berlin. His work has been exhibited globally in several art galleries, great contemporary art fairs, and art centres such as the 'Hamburger Akademie der Kuenste' in 2008.

== Biography ==
Hoenerloh was born in Karlsruhe in the 1960s. He studied History of Art, Philosophy, Music Science, and Germanistik (German Studies). In 1980 he moved to East Berlin where he has lived and worked ever since. In 1986 he started painting one-layer paintings with oil colour. Since 1992 he has been working with several layers of oil and acrylic. Since 2002 Hoenerloh constantly broadened his method by using epoxy and alkyd resin and tempera.

== Art and style ==
At first sight his cityscapes appear to be faithful views of urban scenes when in reality they are pure fiction. Hoenerloh manages to produce this impression of reality thanks to his infallible sense of urban spaces and architectural compositions. His paintings are characterised by immaculate architectural details. For all that a closer look at his pictures shows how close they are to the limits of the subject, the limits of what is plausible, both from the architectural and town planning point of view as from the point of view of color and light.

== Sources ==
Stefan Hoenerloh: Paintings / drawings of decaying buildings in imaginary cityscapes. Berlin. 1993 ASIN: B000NAHEXS
