= Kiki Smith =

American artist (born 1954)

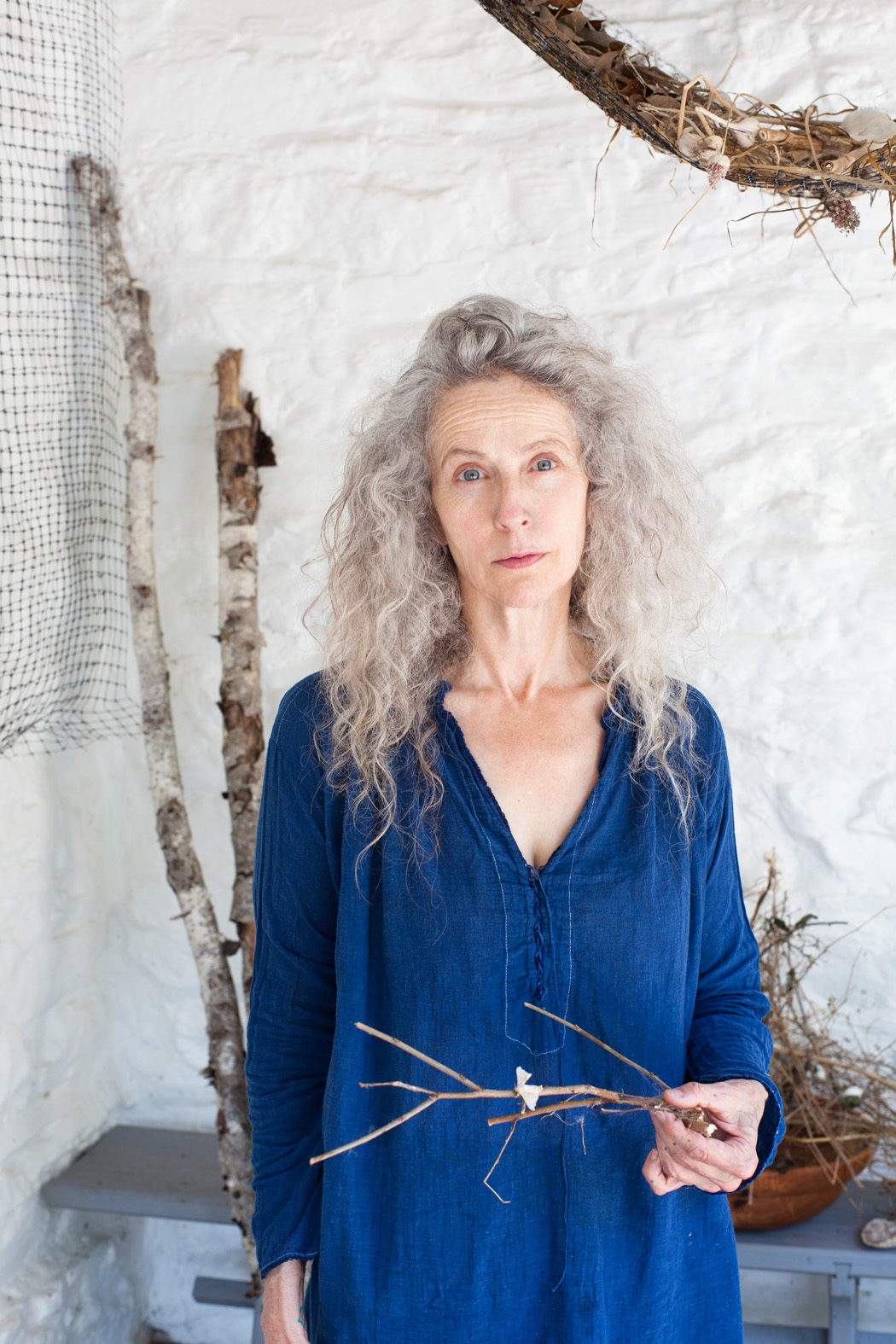
- Kiki Smith in 2013
- Born: January 18, 1954 (age 72); Nuremberg, West Germany
- Known for: Printmaking, sculpture, drawing

My Blue Lake, photogravure with lithograph by Kiki Smith, 1995, Wake Forest University Art Collections

Kiki Smith (born January 18, 1954) is a German-born American artist whose work has addressed the themes of sex, birth and regeneration. Her figurative work of the late 1980s and early 1990s confronted subjects such as AIDS, feminism, and gender, while recent works have depicted the human condition in relationship to nature. Smith lives and works on the Lower East Side of Manhattan in New York City, and in the Hudson Valley.

== Early life and education ==
Smith's father was artist Tony Smith and her mother was actress and opera singer Jane Lawrence. Although her work takes a very different form than that of her parents, early exposure to her father's process of making geometric sculptures allowed her to experience Modernism's formal craftsmanship firsthand. Her childhood experience in the Catholic Church, combined with a fascination for the human body, shaped her artwork conceptually.

Smith moved from Germany to South Orange, New Jersey, as an infant in 1955. That same year, her sisters, Seton Smith and Beatrice (Bebe) Smith, were born in Newark, New Jersey. Smith subsequently attended Columbia High School, but left to attend Changes, Inc. Later, she was enrolled at Hartford Art School in Connecticut for eighteen months from 1974 to 1975. She then moved to New York City in 1976 and joined Collaborative Projects (Colab), an artist collective. The influence of this radical group's use of unconventional materials can be seen in her work. For a short time in 1984, she studied to be an emergency medical technician and sculpted body parts. By 1990, she began to craft human figures.

== Work ==
=== Themes ===
Prompted by her father's death in 1980, and the subsequent death of her sister the underground actress Beatrice "Bebe" Smith, due to AIDS in 1988, Smith began an ambitious investigation of mortality and the physicality of the human body. She has gone on to create works that explore a wide range of human organs; including sculptures of hearts, lungs, stomach, liver and spleen. Related to this was her work exploring bodily fluids, which also had social significance as responses to the AIDS crisis (blood) and women's rights (urine, menstrual blood, feces).

=== Film ===
In 1984, Smith finished a definitively unfinished feminist no wave super8 film, begun in 1981, entitled Cave Girls. It was co-directed by Ellen Cooper.

=== Printmaking ===
Smith has experimented with a wide range of printmaking processes. Some of her earliest print works were screen-printed dresses, scarves and shirts, often with images of body parts. In association with Colab, Smith printed an array of posters in the early 1980s containing political statements or announcing Colab events, such as her The Island of Negative Utopia poster done for ABC No Rio in 1983. In 1988 she created All Souls, a fifteen-foot screen-print work featuring repetitive images of a fetus, an image Smith found in a Japanese anatomy book. Smith printed the image in black ink on 36 attached sheets of handmade Thai paper.

MoMA and the Whitney Museum both have extensive collections of Smith's prints. In the Blue Prints series, 1999, Kiki Smith experimented with the aquatint process. The Virgin with Dove was achieved with an airbrushed aquatint, an acid resist that protects the copper plate. When printed, this technique results in a halo around the Virgin Mary and Holy Spirit.

Since 2015 Kiki Smith has donated her oeuvre of published prints to the Staatliche Graphische Sammlung München: single sheets, series, and artist's books. With an exhibition in 2019 and an online catalogue raisonné, the Staatliche Graphische Sammlung München is honoring Kiki Smith. The artist's generosity extends into the future as well, since she intends to donate a copy of every new edition to Munich.

On October 22, 2026, the New York Public Library announced a gift of 250 Kiki Smith prints, a gift of her sister Seton Smith. Seton Smith has also promised the Library any future prints given to her by Kiki.

=== Sculpture ===
Mary Magdelene (1994), a sculpture made of silicon bronze and forged steel, is an example of Smith's non-traditional use of the female nude. The figure is without skin everywhere but her face, breasts and the area surrounding her navel. She wears a chain around her ankle; her face is relatively undetailed and is turned upwards. Smith has said that when making Mary Magdalene she was inspired by depictions of Mary Magdalene in Southern German sculpture, where she was depicted as a "wild woman". Smith's sculpture Standing (1998), featuring a female figure standing atop the trunk of a Eucalyptus tree, is a part of the Stuart Collection of public art on the campus of the University of California, San Diego. Another sculpture, Lilith (1994), a bronze woman with glass eyes, is on display at the Museum of Fine Arts in Boston. Lilith is an arresting figure, hanging upside down on a wall of the gallery.

In 2005, Smith's installation, Homespun Tales won acclaim at the 51st Venice Biennale. Lodestar, Smith's 2010 installation at the Pace Gallery, was an exhibition of free-standing stained glass works painted with life-size figures.

=== Commissions ===
After five years of development, Smith's first permanent outdoor sculpture was installed in 1998 on the campus of the University of California, San Diego.

In 2010, the Museum at Eldridge Street commissioned Smith and architect Deborah Gans to create a new monumental east window for the 1887 Eldridge Street Synagogue, a National Historic Landmark located on New York's Lower East Side. This permanent commission marked the final significant component of the museum's 20-year restoration and was topped off with an exhibition of site-specific sculptures by Smith in a 2018 show entitled Below the Horizon: Kiki Smith at Eldridge.

For the Claire Tow Theater above the Vivian Beaumont Theater, Smith conceived Overture (2012), a little mobile made of cross-hatched planks and cast-bronze birds.

In 2019, Smith conceived Memory, a site specific installation for the DESTE Foundation for Contemporary Art on the Greek island of Hydra.

=== Artist books ===
She has created unique books, including: Fountainhead (1991); The Vitreous Body (2001); and Untitled (Book of Hours) (1986).

=== Tapestries ===
Since the early 2010s Smith has created twelve 9 x 6 ft. Jacquard tapestries, published by Magnolia Editions. In 2012, Smith showed a series of three of these woven editions at the Neuberger Museum of Art. In early 2019, all twelve were exhibited together as part of "What I saw on the road" at the Palazzo Pitti in Florence, Italy. Smith notes that the tapestries provide an opportunity to work at a larger scale ("I never thought I could make a picture so big") and to work with color, which she does not frequently do otherwise.

=== Mosaics ===
In 2022, Smith to created a series of five giant mosaics for Manhattan train station at Grand Central Madison station, located beneath the Grand Central Terminal. The mosaics are titled River Light, The Water's Way, The Presence, The Spring, and The Sound (all 2022).

== Collaborations ==
Smith was an active member of Collaborative Projects and ABC No Rio; participating in many Potato Wolf broadcasts and the Cardboard Air Band. Smith collaborated with David Wojnarowicz on her first solo exhibition, Life Wants to Live, at The Kitchen. During this period (the early 1980s), Smith collaborated and co-directed with Ellen Cooper on a group collaboration with many young women associated with the Bush Tetras and Colab for her 1984 No Wave underground film Cave Girls. Later she collaborated with poet Mei-mei Berssenbrugge to produce Endocrinology (1997), and Concordance (2006), and with author Lynne Tillman to create Madame Realism (1984). She has worked with poet Anne Waldman on If I Could Say This With My Body, Would I. I Would. Smith also collaborated on a performance featuring choreographer Douglas Dunn and Dancers, musicians Ha-Yang Kim, Daniel Carter, Ambrose Bye, and Devin Brahja Waldman, performed by and set to Anne Waldman's poem Jaguar Harmonics.

== Exhibitions ==
In 1980, Smith participated in the Colab organized exhibition The Times Square Show. In 1982, Smith received her first solo exhibition, Life Wants to Live, at The Kitchen. Since then, her work has been exhibited in nearly 150 solo exhibitions at museums and galleries worldwide and has been featured in hundreds of significant group exhibitions, including the Whitney Biennial, New York (1991, 1993, 2002); La Biennale di Firenze, Florence, Italy (1996-1997; 1998); and the Venice Biennale (1993, 1999, 2005, 2009).

Past solo exhibitions have been held at the Montreal Museum of Fine Arts and the Modern Art Museum, Fort Worth (1996–97); Museum of Contemporary Art, Los Angeles (1996–97); Irish Museum of Modern Art, Dublin (1997–98); Hirshhorn Museum and Sculpture Garden, Washington, DC (1998); Carnegie Museum of Art, Pittsburgh (1998); Center for Curatorial Studies and Art in Contemporary Culture, Bard College, Annandale-on-Hudson (1999); St. Louis Art Museum (1999-2000); and the International Center for Photography (2001).

In 1996, Smith exhibited in a group show at SITE Santa Fe, along with Kara Walker.

In 2005, "the artist's first full-scale American museum survey" titled Kiki Smith: A Gathering, 1980-2005 debuted at the San Francisco Museum of Modern Art. Then an expansion came to the Walker Art Center in Minneapolis where the show originated. At the Walker, Smith coauthored the catalogue raisonné with curator Siri Engberg.

The exhibition traveled to the Contemporary Arts Museum Houston, to the Whitney Museum of American Art in New York, and finally to La Coleccion Jumex in Ecatepec de Morelos outside Mexico City. In 2008, Smith gave Selections from Animal Skulls (1995) to the Walker in honor of Engberg.

In 2016, the Walsh Gallery at Seton Hall University, in collaboration with the Lennie Pierro Memorial Arts Foundation, hosted Kiki and Seton Smith: A Sense of Place.

Smith participated in the 2017 Venice Biennale, Viva Arte Viva, from May 13 – November 16, 2017.

In 2018, Smith took part in Frieze Sculpture (part of Frieze Art Fair, where her work Seer (Alice I), Timothy Taylor (gallery), was presented in Regent's Park, London, England, from July 4 – October 7, 2018.

Also in London in 2018, an exhibition of Smith's tapestries, sculpture and works on paper was presented at the Timothy Taylor (gallery) from September 13 – October 27. Woodland was produced in collaboration with Magnolia Editions.

In 2019 the Staatliche Graphische Sammlung München honored Kiki Smith with an exhibition at the Pinakothek der Moderne, Munich, as the artist has donated her oeuvre of published prints to the Staatliche Graphische Sammlung München: single sheets, series, and artist's books.

In 2019, the Deste Foundation's Project Space at the Slaughterhouse on Hydra island featured Memory, a site specific exhibition.

In 2019, The 11 Conti – Monnaie de Paris presented the first solo show of Smith by a French public institution.

In 2019, the Österreichische Galerie Belvedere in Vienna, Austria, presented a solo show of Smith entitled "Processions", presenting about sixty works from the last three decades.

In 2023-24 the Staatliche Graphische Sammlung München showed works by Kiki Smith in the exhibition "Kiki Smith. From My Heart" at the Pinakothek der Moderne, Munich, to celebrate her 70s birthday.

== Other activities ==
In 2023, Smith served on the jury that chose Sarah Lucas as first winner of the New Museum's $400,000 Hostetler/Wrigley Sculpture Award.

== Recognition ==
Smith's many accolades also include the Nelson A. Rockefeller Award from Purchase College School of the Arts (2010), Women in the Arts Award from the Brooklyn Museum (2009), the 50th Edward MacDowell Medal (2009), the Medal Award from the School of the Museum of Fine Arts, Boston (2006), the Athena Award for Excellence in Printmaking from the Rhode Island School of Design (2006), the Skowhegan Medal for Sculpture from the Skowhegan School of Painting and Sculpture, Maine (2000), and Time Magazines "Time 100: The People Who Shape Our World" (2006). Smith was elected a member of the American Academy of Arts and Letters, New York, in 2005.

In 2012, Smith received the U.S. State Department Medal of Arts from Hillary Clinton. Pieces by Smith adorn consulates in Istanbul and Mumbai. After being chosen speaker for the annual Patsy R. and Raymond D. Nasher Lecture Series in Contemporary Sculpture and Criticism in 2013, Smith became the artist-in-residence for the University of North Texas Institute for the Advancement of the Arts in the 2013–14 academic year.

In 2016, Smith was awarded the International Sculpture Center's Lifetime Achievement in Contemporary Sculpture Award.
