= Li Wei (artist) =

Chinese artist

- Born: 5 September 1970 (age 55); Hubei, China
- Education: Suzhou Silk College; Central Academy of Fine Arts; Sichuan Academy of Fine Arts; An Hui Teachers' College; Zhejiang Academy of Fine Arts

Li Wei
- Traditional Chinese: 李暐
- Simplified Chinese: 李𬀩
Transcriptions
Standard Mandarin
- Hanyu Pinyin: Lǐ Wěi

Li Wei (simplified Chinese: 李𬀩; traditional Chinese: 李暐; pinyin: Lǐ Wěi; born in 1970, Hubei, China) is a contemporary artist from Beijing, China. His work often depicts him in apparently gravity-defying situations. Wei started off his performance series, Mirroring, and later on took off attention with his Falls series which shows the artist with his head and chest embedded into the ground. His work is a mixture of performance art and photography that creates illusions of a sometimes dangerous reality. Li Wei states that these images are not computer montages, but that he uses mirrors, metal wires, scaffolding and acrobatics.

Wei's works have been published on the cover of the following magazines: Flash Art, Work, Magazin-Frankfurter Rundschau, Out of the Red, Zoom, Juliet, Contemporary, Theater Forum, NY Arts, Fine Arts Literature, Lapiz and Arte Al Limite.

== Life and work ==
Li Wei grew up being a son of a farmer and had wanted to become an artist for a career. With family support he had the special privilege to study at a private arts school until he was tired of the school's traditional approach of teaching. However, Li Wei's struggle with art did not end early in his life. After Li Wei became independent he had to work numerous jobs (delivering food and house keeper) in Beijing in order for him to sustain himself; but more importantly he needed the money to supply his art works (at the time painting) so that he could continue to work towards his dream. After Li Wei kick started his career as an artist by working with paint, Li Wei realized a newfound passion and wanted to specialize in a different form of art. In 1999 he believed that "only performance art offers a chance to experience an action's message through one's own body". Since then Li Wei has been intentional about his art pieces and has desired to express his work publicly with a message behind each art piece. Li Wei has been expressing his art by capturing photos of his own body and images of himself to relay a message towards his audience.

But before becoming a photographer Li Wei started as a performance artist simply because he wanted to document his performances. In an interview with AOL News Li Wei states "When I started doing this, it was 2000, I only used photography to record the procedure of my performance art. Then, after the 'Li Wei falls into ... ' series, I found this way of shooting as my signal." And since then Li Wei has already a performed for over 150 shots and many of these shots have risked his life. Li Wei himself admits that he shoots in extremely dangerous situations and he thinks the creation of his artwork isn't as a big of a challenge than being in the dangerous situation for his performance shootouts. Some of these dangerous scenarios include shots on high buildings, lakes, ice holes and even through the windshield of a car.

Li Wei's rise to fame was through his performance of the “Falls” series in which he sticks himself in the group as a missile. Through this performance he wanted to relay the modern man's desire to hide away from the problems that occur daily.

Li Wei's art is a difficult process. In pieces such as “Li wei Falls to the Ice Hole,” his head is planted and unseen, while his body remains rigid and upright. These photos are shocking and make the viewer puzzle over their achievement. Wei has a knack for creating catalytic art that awes and intrigues people fortunate enough to come across it. Many of Wei's photos have layered meanings, demonstrating various aspects of Chinese society. In “Li Wei's Body of Art” by Julie Segraves, Wei comments on his “Falls” series, in which he demonstrates the shock of societal progression.

Many of Li Wei's works are done through the usage of mirrors. The mirror would usually contain a hole in the middle for Li Wei to insert his head. With this technique Li Wei is able to create an “illusory superimpositions and fusions.” Within the Chinese culture the mirror possesses a great symbolic meaning. The mirror is an indicator of truth, allowing people to look at themselves and look at the mistakes they have made in life. Furthermore, there is a Chinese proverb that says “take history as a mirror”, which means that things that occurred throughout history will occur again and it is essential for individuals to recognize mistakes made from people in the past and react differently when similar issues come up again.

Li Wei's art may seem humorous but they address wide range of topics from gender relations to politics. By creating art through mirrors, Li Wei has been able to express his personal thoughts, experiences and address some social issues that occur in our daily lives. Wei has been able to challenge the public audience's perception of 'reality' and 'truth' with his work.

The actual shootout for his artwork takes about one or two hours but the preparation time is much longer. Wei could be inspired with an idea, an image in his head he wants to enact in real life, but it can take many months until he actual puts his idea into reality. Moreover, Wei hopes that he can one day shoot on the moon with a rocket. Li Wei's goal is to "make everything impossible possible."

Li Wei is a forward thinking artist with fresh ideologies. In an interview with 'The Creators Project' Wei makes the interesting point that "we are all controlled by someone else. Our thoughts and actions are all controlled by an unseen force." What Wei is pointing out here is that there is an external force that dictates us and our behaviors. Furthermore, Wei mentions about the rapid changes that occurred in China in the last decade. As a citizen of Beijing, Wei fully experienced the rapid change within China's economy and the exponential growth in all types of markets in China. Wei's concern with the rapid growth was the confinement of space due to the rapid growth. People from the country started to move into the cities, into tall confined apartments. Wei feels like the rapid growth has caused a huge change and strain on people's perceptions and emotions. Due to destruction of old buildings and forced move into apartments people are forced into small confined spaces. As a result, people want to break free from these limitations, an issue that hasn't been a problem for the past decades. With this concern Wei has created art that expresses the feeling of 'breaking free', art pieces that show the hunger and will to break away from limitations and confinement. Moreover, Wei discusses his message behind his Fall series as they are not about belonging to earth, but rather it's about looking at the earth with the perspective from outer space. Wei wants his audience to look at things with a different perspective. Wei wants to draw out the fine line between reality and fantasy and point it out to the audience. And Wei intends to relay his perception of this world through his photography and performance art.

=== Exhibitions ===
Li Wei's artwork has been exhibited in Asia, Australia, Europe, and North America. Solo Exhibitions include Parc de la Villette, Paris (2012), Lucca, Italy (2011), 10 Chancery Lane Gallery, Hong Kong (2010;2006), Shanghai Tang, Hong Kong (2010), Tribeca, Madrid (2009), Michael Schultz Gallery, Beijing (2009), Mogadishni CPH gallery, Denmark (2009), Yeh Rong Jia Culture & Art Foundation, Taiwan (2008), EScape Cultural Ample Gallery, Spain (2007), PYO Gallery, Seoul (2006), Galeria Espacio Minimo, Madrid (2006), Marella Gallery, Beijing (2005), Marella Gallery, Italy (2004)

Li Wei's work was included in Katonah Museum of Art, United States (2012), Beijing Times Art Museum, China (2011), Daegu Photo Biennale 2010 in Korea (2010), Palazzo Reale Museum, Milan (2009), Olympic Museum, Switzerland (2008), Criterion Gallery, Australia (2007), Toulouse Art Museum, France (2006), Ox Warehouse, Macau (2005), MMAC exhibition, Japan (2004), Prague Biennial in Czech Republic (2003), Beijing Red Square, Beijing (2002), Hong Kong Arts Center, Hong Kong (2001), Performance Art Festival, Beijing (2000)

== Mirror Series ==
Li Wei began with the performance series “Mirroring” in 2000. In a mirror about a yard wide he cut a hole for his head. The mirror, propped by his hands, can be seen in many photos documenting the performances in private places but also in many public ones in China and abroad. Long shots show the observers as well as their surroundings mirrored round the performer's head. Close-ups are more striking in excluding the mirror's rim and the artist's body. Li's head seems to hover, be it in the midst of a crowd of observers, in a gully between buildings, in the sky or on glittering water. “The mirror turns concrete reality into an immaterial image by establishing new relationships between things. The process mirrors that of imagination, since we are always putting single impressions together to form an imaginary reality. Insofar as my head is stuck in the middle of this reflection one of the important functions of contemporary art becomes evident: it is unsettling – like this performance – and questions our everyday habits of perception. We see ourselves and also the surrounding reality anew.”

== Fall series ==
One of his effective series of performances has been his "Falls", begun in 2002. Photos show the artist with his head and chest embedded in the asphalt of a street, the roof of a ruined house or the ice of a lake with his legs pointing up to the sky. "No, these images are not computer montages," the artist tells us. Sometimes he worked with the help of props in the literal sense of the word. But for him the main thing was physical exertion, the experience be it brief of keeping a posture up and of feeling the absurdity of the situation through his own body. "If you picture someone falling to earth from another planet... it would really be no soft landing in the sense of a happy moment, whether the landing were in China or in another part of the world: It’s crazy what we do to one another. And this feeling of having fallen headfirst into something and of having nothing firm under the feet is familiar to everyone. One doesn’t have to fall from another planet to feel it."

== Award ==
Wei has received the following awards for his work:

- Macau Art Museum Overseas Communicate the Prize (Macau Art Museum, 2005)
- 31 Photographers with the Most Creative World (American Getty, 2006)
