= Joseph Nechvatal =

American artist (born 1951)

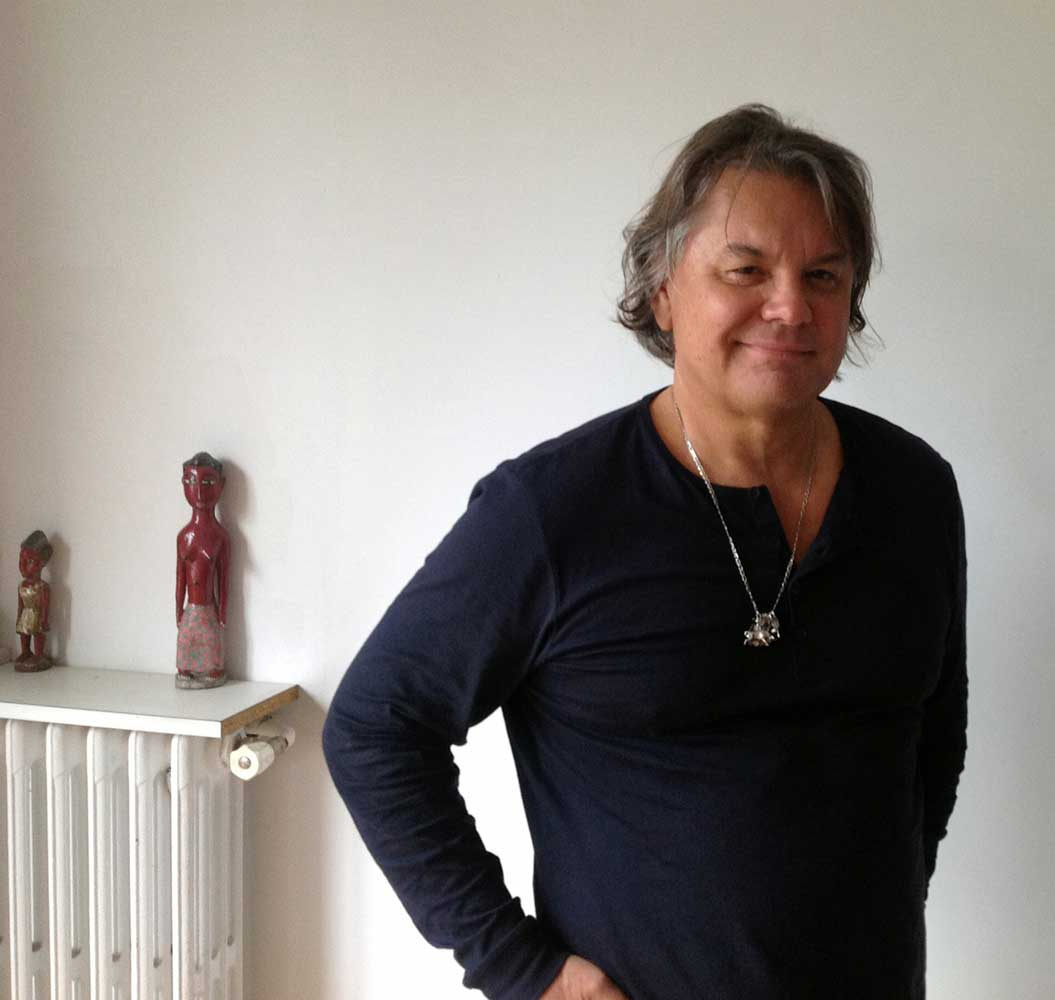
- Nechvatal in 2015
- Born: January 15, 1951 (age 75); Chicago, Illinois, U.S.
- Known for: post-conceptual art, digital art, sound art, art theory, art criticism, poetry, novella, artificial life, computer-robotic painting, noise music, no wave postminimalism
- Movement: post-conceptualism generative art no wave

Joseph Nechvatal (born January 15, 1951) is an American post-conceptual digital artist and art theoretician who creates computer-assisted paintings and computer animations, often using custom computer viruses.

== Life and work ==
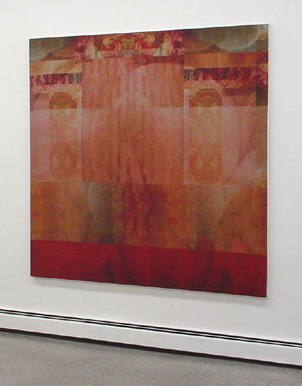
Joseph Nechvatal birth Of the viractual 2001 computer-robotic assisted acrylic on canvas

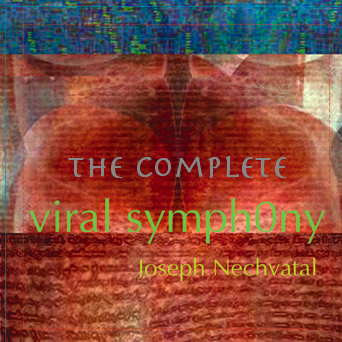
Full viral symphOny cover: art by Joseph Nechvatal

Joseph Nechvatal was born in Chicago. He studied fine art and philosophy at Southern Illinois University Carbondale, Cornell University, and Columbia University. He earned a Doctor of Philosophy in Philosophy of Art and Technology at the Planetary Collegium at University of Wales, Newport and has taught art theory and art history at the School of Visual Arts. He has had many solo exhibitions and is one of five artists that art historian Patrick Frank examines in his 2024 book Art of the 1980s: As If the Digital Mattered.

His work in the late 1970s and early 1980s chiefly consisted of postminimal gray palimpsest-like drawings that were often photo-mechanically enlarged. Beginning in 1979 he became associated with the artist group Colab, organized the Public Arts International/Free Speech series, and helped established the non-profit group ABC No Rio. In 1983 he co-founded the avant-garde electronic art music audio project Tellus Audio Cassette Magazine. In 1984, Nechvatal began work on an opera called XS: The Opera Opus (1984-6) with the no wave musical composer Rhys Chatham.

He began using computers and robotics to make post-conceptual paintings in 1986 and later, in his signature work, began to employ self-created computer viruses. From 1991 to 1993, he was artist-in-residence at the Louis Pasteur Atelier in Arbois, France and at the Saline Royale/Ledoux Foundation's computer lab. There he worked on The Computer Virus Project, his first artistic experiment with computer viruses and computer virus animation. He exhibited computer-robotic paintings at Documenta 8 in 1987.

In 2002 he extended his experimentation into viral artificial life through a collaboration with the programmer Stephane Sikora of music2eye in a work called the Computer Virus Project II.

Nechvatal has also created a noise music work called viral symphOny, a collaborative sound symphony created by using his computer virus software at the Institute for Electronic Arts at Alfred University. In 2021 Pentiments released Nechvatal's retrospective audio cassette called Selected Sound Works (1981-2021) and in 2022 his The Viral Tempest, a double vinyl LP of new audio work. In 2025, he joined the roster of artists/musicians at Table of the Elements with two CD/book releases: Selected Sound Works (1981-2021) and The Marriage of Orlando and Artaud, Even.

From 1999 to 2013, Nechvatal taught art theories of immersive virtual reality and the viractual at the School of Visual Arts in New York City (SVA). A book of his collected essays entitled Towards an Immersive Intelligence: Essays on the Work of Art in the Age of Computer Technology and Virtual Reality (1993–2006) was published by Edgewise Press in 2009. Also in 2009, his virtual reality art theory and art history book Immersive Ideals / Critical Distances was published. In 2011, his book Immersion Into Noise was published by Open Humanities Press in conjunction with the University of Michigan Library's Scholarly Publishing Office. Nechvatal has also published three books with Punctum Books: Minóy (noise music—ed.—2014), Destroyer of Naivetés (poetry—2015), and Styling Sagaciousness (poetry—2022). In 2023 his art theory cybersex farce novella venus©~Ñ~vibrator, even was published by Orbis Tertius Press

The Joseph Nechvatal archive is housed at The Fales Library Downtown Collection at the NYU Special Collections Library in New York City.

=== Viractualism ===
Viractualism is an art theory concept developed by Nechvatal in 1999 from Ph.D. research Nechvatal conducted at the Planetary Collegium at University of Wales, Newport. There he developed his concept of the viractual, which strives to create an interface between the actual and the virtual.
