= Rhys Chatham =

American composer

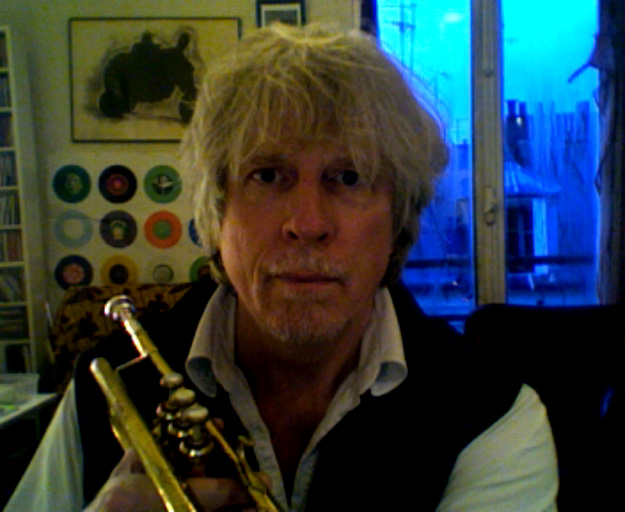

Background information
- Born: September 19, 1952 (age 73)
- Origin: New York City, U.S.
- Genres: Minimalism, no wave, experimental rock, noise
- Occupations: Composer, guitarist, music theorist, trumpeter
- Instruments: Guitar, trumpet, flute, keyboards
- Years active: 1971–present
- Labels: Northern Spy; Nonesuch; Moers Music; Dossier; NTone/Ninja Tune; Table of the Elements; Wire Editions
- Website: www.rhyschatham.net

Rhys Chatham (born September 19, 1952) is an American composer, guitarist, trumpet player, and multi-instrumentalist (flutes in C, alto and bass, keyboard), primarily active in avant-garde and minimalist music. He is best known for his "guitar orchestra" compositions. He has lived in France since 1987.

== Early years ==
Chatham began his musical career as a piano tuner for avant-garde Minimalist composer La Monte Young as well as harpsichord tuner for Gustav Leonhardt, Rosalyn Tureck and Glenn Gould. He studied flute under Sue Ann Kahn, with whom he first encountered contemporary classical music, and studied soon afterwards under electronic music pioneer Morton Subotnick and minimalist icon La Monte Young. He was a member of Young's avant-garde group, Theatre of Eternal Music during the early seventies. Chatham also played with Tony Conrad in an early version of Conrad's group, The Dream Syndicate. In 1971, while still in his teens, Chatham became the first music director at the experimental art space The Kitchen in lower Manhattan. His early musical work, such as Two Gongs (1971) owes a significant debt to La Monte Young and other minimalists such as Terry Riley and Philip Glass.

== Compositions from the late 1970s and early 1980s ==
By 1977, Chatham's music was heavily influenced by punk rock, having seen an early Ramones concert. He formed the No Wave groups Tone Death (that performed early versions of his Guitar Trio) and The Gynecologists after being intrigued and influenced by the group of artists that music critics would label No Wave in 1978. That year, he began performing Guitar Trio around downtown Manhattan with an ensemble that included Glenn Branca, as well as Nina Canal of Ut. During this period, he wrote several works for large guitar ensembles, including Drastic Classicism, a collaboration with dancer Karole Armitage. Drastic Classicism was first released in 1982 on the compilation New Music from Antarctica, put together by Kit Fitzgerald, John Sanborn and Peter Laurence Gordon. It was also included on the 1987 album that also included his 1982 composition Die Donnergötter (German for "The Thundergods").

In 1978, Artists Space served as a site of inception for the No Wave movement, hosting a five night underground No Wave music festival, organized by artists Michael Zwack and Robert Longo, that featured ten local bands; including Chatham's The Gynecologists and Tone Death.

Members of the New York City noise rock band Band of Susans began their careers in Chatham's ensembles; they later performed a cover of Chatham's "Guitar Trio" on their 1991 album, The Word and the Flesh. (This parallels the way that members of fellow NYC noise rockers Sonic Youth began their careers in Branca's ensembles; Thurston Moore of Sonic Youth did play with Chatham as well.)

Chatham began playing trumpet in 1983, studying under Carmine Curuso and Andrew Crocker, and his more recent works explore an early minimalist vocabulary employing loop and delay techniques for trumpet; these are performed by Chatham himself. Examples of this work can be heard on the album Outdoor Spell, released by Northern Spy in 2011, and a recent duo album with Charlemagne Palestine, entitled Youuu + Mee = Weee, released on the Belgian SubRosa Label in 2014.

== Recent activity ==
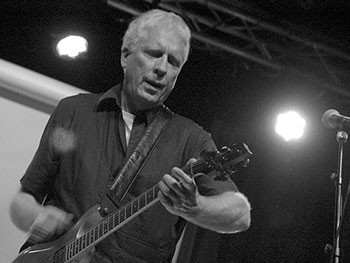
Rhys Chatham in Aarhus Denmark 2013

In 2002, he enjoyed a resurgence following the release of a limited-edition 3 CD retrospective box set on the record label Table of the Elements, An Angel Moves Too Fast to See: Selected Works 1971-1989, complete with 130-page booklet. The An Angel Moves Too Fast to See part of the title comes from Chatham's 1989 composition for one hundred guitars. He has been since touring with his one-hundred guitar orchestra in Europe.

In 2005, he was commissioned by the city of Paris, in his adopted homeland, to write a composition for 400 electric guitars entitled A Crimson Grail, as part of the Nuit Blanche Festival. Approximately 10,000 people were present at the performance, and 100,000 more watched it on live television. A CD of excerpts from this concert was released in January 2007 by Table of the Elements.

Rhys Chatham was touring the original 30 minute version of Guitar Trio in the USA and Europe, renamed G3 because the instrumentation had been increased to between six and ten electric guitars, electric bass and drums. In February 2007 he completed a twelve-city tour called the Guitar Trio (G3) Is My Life North America Tour, which was accompanied by the original film by Robert Longo that was projected behind the performance, entitled Pictures for Music (1979). The sets consisted of local musicians from each city of the performances, including members of Sonic Youth, Tortoise, Godspeed You! Black Emperor, Hüsker Dü, Brokeback, 90 Day Men, Town & Country, Die Kreuzen, Bird Show and others. A three-CD box set of these performances was released by Table of the Elements in March 2008.

Rhys Chatham made his first American presentation of a composition for a one-hundred guitar orchestra in Williamsport, Pennsylvania, on May 23, 2008, with an orchestra composed of local students and teachers, as well as many professional guitarists. This performance was the premiere of a new composition entitled Les 100 Guitares: G100.

The American premiere of A Crimson Grail was on August 8, 2008. Two-hundred electric guitarists performed the piece at the Damrosch Park Bandshell in New York City. The performance was part of a free concert series, Lincoln Center Out of Doors, that was being commissioned by the Lincoln Center. But rain canceled the concert for safety reasons. For the 2009 premiere, precautions were taken so that the concert could go on even if it rained.

Concurrent with his work for guitar orchestras and smaller ensembles, Chatham's trumpet style has evolved from its characteristic distorted sound of the 90s to its present more dreamy and laid back approach to playing the instrument, influenced by players such as Don Cherry and Jon Hassell. Examples of this style can be heard on Chatham's releases, The Bern Project, released by Hinterzimmer Records in 2010, and Outdoor Spell, released in 2011 by Northern Spy.

In 2023, Chatham and his No Wave XS: The Opera Opus was featured at the Paris Centre Pompidou in a Nicolas Ballet curated exhibition entitled Who You Staring At: Visual culture of the no wave scene in the 1970s and 1980s. A video documenting the Pompidou March 8 event XS: The Opera Opus: An Operatic Transvaluation of No Wave Aesthetics by Joseph Nechvatal and Rhys Chatham was held and published online at the Pompidou website.

In 2026, Chatham premiered an electronic music composition called La Tortue, ses rêves et ses voyages (The Turtle: Its Dreams and Travels) at Studio 104 in the Maison de la Radio et de la Musique in Paris as part of the 21st edition of the PRÉSENCES électronique music festival and a 60 minute audio interview of Chatham (in French) was aired on the French national public radio station and podcast France Musique.

== Discography ==
- Factor X (LP), Moers Music 1983
  containing:
  - For Brass (1982)
  - Guitar Ring (1982)
  - The Out of Tune Guitar (1982)
  - Cadenza (1981)
- Die Donnergötter (LP), Dossier Records (Europe)/Homestead Records (USA) 1987 Table of the Elements 2006
  containing:
  - Die Donnergötter (1984–86)
  - Waterloo No. 2 (1986)
  - Guitar Trio (1977)
  - Drastic Classicism (1982)
- Neon (12", CDEP), Ntone 1997
  All compositions in collaboration with Martin Wheeler.
  containing:
  - Charm (1996)
  - Ramatek (1994)
  - Hornithology (1996)
  - Neon (1993)
- Septile (12", CD EP), Ntone 1997
  All compositions in collaboration with Jonathan Kane & DJ Elated System.
- Hardedge, The Wire Editions 1999
  Made in collaboration with Pat Thomas, Gary Smith, Gary Jeff, Lou Ciccotelli.
- A Rhys Chatham Compendium (CD), Table of the Elements 2002
  Limited-edition CD featuring selections and edits from the An Angel Moves Too Fast to See box-set.
  containing:
  - An Angel Moves Too Fast to See (1989) [edit]
  - Guitar Trio (1977) [edit]
  - Drastic Classicism (1982) [edit]
  - Two Gongs (1971) [edit]
  - Guitar Cetet (1977) [bonus track not contained in box set]
  - Waterloo, No. 2 (1986) [edit]
  - Die Donnergötter (1985) [complete version]
- An Angel Moves Too Fast to See (Selected Works 1971-1989) (3xCD box set), Table of the Elements 2002
  - disc 1:
    - Two Gongs (1971)
  - disc 2:
    - Die Donnergötter (1985)
    - Waterloo, No. 2 (1986)
    - Drastic Classicism (1982)
    - Guitar Trio (1977)
    - Massacre on MacDougal Street (1982)
  - disc 3:
    - An Angel Moves Too Fast to See (1989)
- Echo Solo (LP), Azoth Schallplatten Gesellschaft 2003
- Three Aspects of the Name (12"), Table of the Elements 2003
- An Angel Moves Too Fast to See (For 100 Electric Guitars, Electric Bass, and Drums) (LP, CD), Table of the Elements/Radium 2006
- Die Donnergötter (LP, CD), Table of the Elements/Radium 2006
  containing:
  - Die Donnergötter (1985/86)
  - Waterloo, No. 2 (1986)
  - Drastic Classicism (1982)
  - Guitar Trio (1977)
  - Massacre on MacDougal Street (1982)

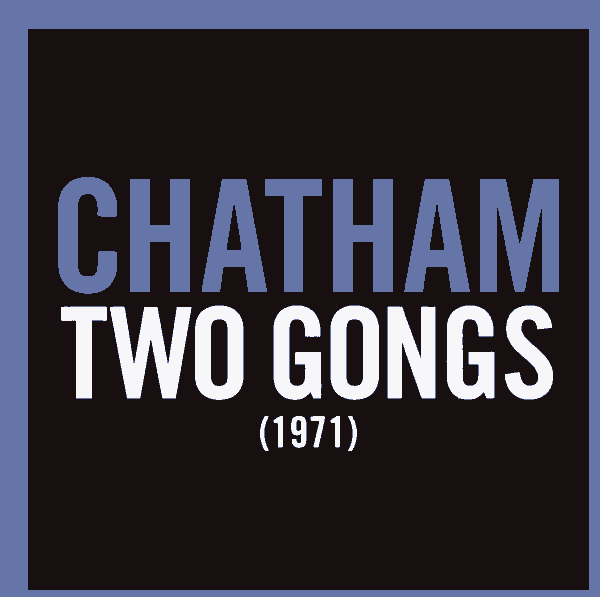
Album cover for Two Gongs (1971).

- Two Gongs (1971) (CD), Table of the Elements 2006
- A Crimson Grail (For 400 Electric Guitars) (CD), Paris Version / Indoor Version, Table of the Elements 2007
- The Bern Project (CD), Hinterzimmer Records 2010
  containing:
  - War in Heaven (2009)
  - A Rite for Samhain (2009)
  - Scrying in Smoke (2009)
  - My Lady of the Loire (2009)
  - Is There Life After Guitar Trio (2009)
  - Under the Petals of the Rose (2009)
- A Crimson Grail (For 200 Electric Guitars) (CD), New York Version / Outdoor Version, Nonesuch Records 2010

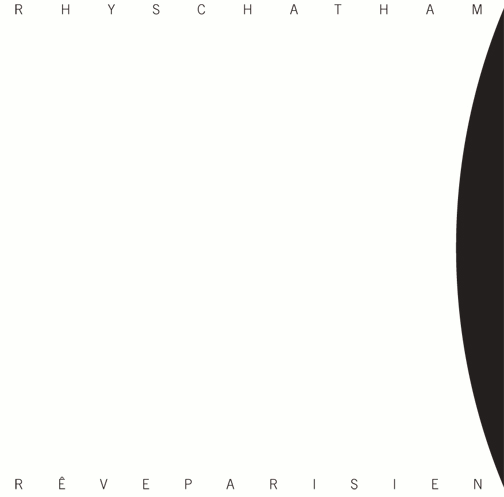
Album cover for Rêve Parisien

- Outdoor Spell (LP, CD), Northern-Spy (NS 004) 2011
  containing:
  - Outdoor Spell
  - Crossing the Sword Bridge
  - Corn Maiden's Rite
  - The Magician
- Rêve Parisien (LP), Primary Information 2011
- Harmonie du soir (LP, CD), Northern-Spy 2013
  containing:
  - Harmonie du soir
  - Harmonie de Pontarlier: The Dream of Rhonabwy
  - Drastic Classicism Revisited
- Youuu + Mee = Weee (LP, CD), Sub Rosa (SR637) 2014
  All compositions in collaboration with Charlemagne Palestine.
- Pythagorean Dream (LP, CD), Foom 2016
- What's Your Sign? (LP, CD), Northern Spy 2016
  All compositions in collaboration with Oneida.
  containing:
  - You Get Brighter
  - Bad Brains
  - Well Tuned Guitar
  - The Mabinogian
  - A. Philip Randlop at Back Bay Station
  - Civil Weather
- TomorrowStartsTonight (CD), Klang Galerie 2023 (gg435)
  All compositions in collaboration with David Fenech.
  containing:
  - In Search of Tomorrow
  - Tomorrow Together
  - Tomorrow Starts Tonight

== See also ==
- The Gynecologists
- Mudd Club
- XS: The Opera Opus
- Tier 3
- No wave
- Noise Fest
- Minimalism (music)
- Noise music
- List of noise musicians
- Post-punk
