= Dietmar Kirves =

German poet and artist

Dietmar Kirves (born 1941 in Fürstenwalde, Germany).

== Early work ==
Since 1964, he works in the field of mixed media works with film, photos, music, sculptures and environments.

In 1970, he created a media contact agency in Düsseldorf in collaboration with Jochen Gerz and Terry Fox. In 1975, quit the traditional art scene.

Kirves was co-worker for several editions of Ausgabe by Edition Hundertmark, Cologne.

== NO!art Movement ==
He had the first meeting with Boris Lurie in 1978 for pushing NO!art movement, founded by Boris Lurie, Stanley Fisher, and Sam Goodman at March gallery New York in 1960, to stronger development.

He was responsible for the first verification of NO!art anthology (1978-1988) and the NO!art Box at Edition Hundertmark, Cologne.

Since 1999 Dietmar Kirves beside Clayton Patterson (FRONT WEST) is leader of the NO!art, leading headquarter (FRONT EAST).

He works at the World Wide Web with continuation the NO!art movement and organized several NO!art shows, exhibitions and editions for the NO!art.

He worked together with the founders and most of the members of the NO!art, members are Rocco Armento, Isser Aronovici, Enrico Baj, Paolo Baratella, Herb Brown, Ronaldo Brunet, Guenter Brus, Al D'Arcangelo, Aleksey Dayen, Frank-Kirk Ehm-Marks, Erró, Klaus Fabricius, Charles Gatewood, Paul Georges, Jochen Gerz, Dorothie Gillespie, Esther Morgenstern Gilman, Amikam Goldman, Leon Golub, Blalla W. Hallmann, Harry Hass, Allan Kaprow, Kommissar Hjuler (Detlev Hjuler) and Mama Baer (Andrea Katharina Ingeborg Hjuler), Yayoi Kusama, Konstantin K. Kuzminsky, Jean-Jacques Lebel, Suzanne Long (Harriet Wood), LST, Enzo Mastrangelo, Stu Mead, Peter Meseck, Lil Picard, Leonid Pinchevsky, Bernard Rancillac, Francis Salles, Naomi Tereza Salmon, Reinhard Scheibner, Bruno Schleinstein, Dominik Stahlberg, Michelle Stuart, Aldo Tambellini, Seth Tobocman, Jean Toche, Toyo Tsuchiya, Wolf Vostell, Friedrich Wall, Mathilda Wolf, Natalia E. Woytasik, Miron Zownir.
