= Wittmann Patch =

Temporary abdominal fascia prosthesis

The Wittmann Patch is a temporary abdominal fascia prosthesis for the planned open abdomen to ease the management of cases where the abdomen cannot be closed due to abdominal compartment syndrome or because multiple further operations are planned (damage control repair [DCR]). It consists of a sterile hook and a sterile loop sheet made from propylene and nylon.

== History ==
The Wittmann Patch was invented by Dietmar H. Wittmann in 1987 while he was a professor of surgery at the University of Hamburg's School of Medicine in Hamburg Germany. Wittmann continued research on the Wittmann Patch fascia prosthesis in the Department of Surgery at the Medical College of Wisconsin. The fascia prosthesis became commercially available in Europe in 1992 (HIDIH-Surgical) and in the US in 2000 (Starsurgical, Inc).

== Synonyms ==
- Fascia Prosthesis,
- Abdominal Fascia Prosthesis,
- Temporary Abdominal Fascia Prosthesis,
- Artificial Bur,
- Bur Patch,
- Abdominal Bur Closure (ABC-Patch)

== Trade names ==
Wittmann Patch (Starsurgical, Inc., Burlington WI)

== Indications ==
A Acute conditions

- Abdominal compartment syndrome
- Blunt abdominal trauma
- Penetrating abdominal trauma
- Traumatic and non-traumatic intra-abdominal hemorrhage
- Ruptured abdominal aortic aneurysm
- Peritonitis / intra-abdominal infections
- Acute pancreatitis / infected pancreatic necrosis
- Bowel ischemia

B Chronic conditions

- Chronic open abdomen with fistulas
- Chronic open abdomen without fistulas
- Large ventral hernias with fistulas
- Large ventral hernias without fistulas
- Failed ventral hernia repairs with meshes

C Prophylactically to avoid abdominal compartment syndrome

- excessive peritoneal inflammation from abdominal organ transplantation
- excessive peritoneal inflammation from major abdominal operations

== Contraindications ==
The patch is not intended for permanent implantation.

== Operative technique ==
The original bur as used by Wittmann consists of two sheets of the same size of 40 × 20 cm:

- A softer loop sheet that covers omentum with its tissue-friendly back side – loops facing outwards
- A harder hook sheet on top of the loop sheet – hooks facing inwards to be pressed into the loops

The softer loop sheet is sutured to the right fascia using a running looped #1 Nylon suture. The stitches are 2 cm apart and 2 cm into the fascia and 1–2 cm into the bur to permit good perfusion between stitches. The sheet with loops facing outwards is then pushed between parietal and visceral peritoneum of the other side of the incision covering abdominal content.

Then the harder hook sheet is similarly sutured to the left fascia, and hooks are gently pressed into the loops of the loop sheet.

Generally, the hook sheet is trimmed to fit the size of the open abdomen wound. In case of the massive peritoneal hypertension both sheets cover the open space and the hook sheet does not need trimming to fit the wound opening.

== Clinical benefits ==
- Use of the Wittmann Patch in patients allows for a significantly increased rate of delayed primary fascial closure after temporary abdominal closure when compared with a vacuum only closure or the use of a Bogota bag.
- Use of the Wittmann Patch in combination with staged abdominal repair decreases mortality by 20% in patients with APACHE-II score of 20.
