= Ditmars =

Ditmars may refer to:

== People ==
- Abram D. Ditmars, two-time mayor of Long Island City in Queens, New York, US
- Ivan Ditmars, music writer for Let's Make a Deal from 1963 to 1976
- Raymond Ditmars (1876–1942), American herpetologist and filmmaker

== Places ==
- Ditmars, Queens, a neighborhood in the Astoria neighborhood of Queens, New York, US
- Ditmars Boulevard–Astoria (BMT Astoria Line), a rapid transit station in New York City
- Ditmars Boulevard (formerly Ditmars Avenue), a street in New York City

== See also ==
- Dietmar, a given name
- Ditmar (disambiguation)
- Dittmar, a surname
