= Wuttke =

Wuttke is a German locational surname, which originally meant a person from Wutike, near Neuruppin, Germany. The name may refer to:

- Adolf Wuttke (1819–1870), German theologian
- Dietmar Wuttke (born 1978), German football player
- Heinrich Wuttke (1818–1876), German historian
- Jörg Elling Wuttke (born 1970), German musician
- Martin Wuttke (born 1962), German actor
- Tim Wuttke (born 1987), German football player
- Wolfram Wuttke (1961–2015), German football player

== Fiction ==
- Peter Wuttke, fictional character in the German television series Die Wochenshow
