= Railroad Collage =

Railroad Collage is a controversial mixed media collage produced by Boris Lurie in 1959 which superimposed a pin-up girl onto a well-known liberation photograph, which featured a flatbed of stacked with corpses, juxtaposing the American consumer culture with the Holocaust. The collage which is considered to be an elaboration of Lurie's earlier work, Flatcar Assemblage by Adolf Hitler, is considered to be Boris Lurie most notorious and controversial work.

== See also ==
- NO!Art
