= Dietmar =

Dietmar is a German forename.

- Dietmar I (archbishop of Salzburg), ruled 874 to 907
- Dietmar von Aist, Minnesinger from a baronial family of Upper Austria, documented between 1140 and 1171
- Dietmar Bär (born 1961), German actor
- Dietmar Bartsch (born 1958), German politician, former Bundesgeschäftsführer
- Dietmar Beiersdorfer (born 1963), former footballer and coach
- Dietmar Berchtold (born 1974), Austrian football midfielder
- Dietmar Bonnen (born 1958), German composer and pianist
- Dietmar Bruck (born 1944), professional footballer
- Dietmar Burger (born 1968), Austrian darts player
- Dietmar Constantini (1955–2024), Austrian footballer and manager
- Dietmar Danner (born 1950), German footballer
- Dietmar Dath (born 1970), German author, journalist and translator
- Dietmar Demuth (born 1955), German former footballer who is now manager
- Dietmar Falkenberg, East German former bobsledder
- Dietmar Feichtinger (born 1961), Austrian architect in Paris
- Dietmar Hötger (born 1947), German judo athlete
- Dietmar Haaf (born 1967), former (West) German long jumper
- Dietmar Hamann (born 1973), German footballer
- Dietmar Hirsch (born 1971), retired German football player
- Dietmar Hopp (born 1940), German software entrepreneur
- Dietmar Jerke, East German bobsledder
- Dietmar Keck (born 1957), Austrian politician
- Dietmar Kirves (born 1941), multimedia artist
- Dietmar Klinger (born 1958), retired German football player
- Dietmar Koszewski (born 1967), retired German hurdler
- Dietmar Kühbauer (born 1971), former Austrian football midfielder
- Dietmar Lorenz (1950–2021), East German judoka
- Dietmar Mögenburg (born 1961), former (West) German high jumper and Olympic gold medallist
- Dietmar Mürdter (1943–2003), former professional German footballer
- Dietmar Meinel, German Nordic combined skier
- Dietmar Meisch (born 1959), retired East German race walker
- Dietmar Rosenthal (1899–1994), Russian linguist
- Dietmar Roth (born 1963), former German footballer
- Dietmar Rothermund, Germany historian best known for his research in the economy of India
- Dietmar Saupe (born 1954), fractal researcher and professor of computer science, University of Konstanz, Germany
- Dietmar Schönherr (1926–2014), Austrian film actor
- Dietmar Schacht (born 1962), former professional German footballer
- Dietmar Schauerhammer (born 1955), East German two-time Winter Olympic champion
- Dietmar Schiller, German rower
- Dietmar Schlöglmann (born 1955), Austrian sprint canoeist
- Dietmar Schmidt (born 1952), former East German handball player
- Dietmar Schwager (1940–2018), retired German football coach and player
- Dietmar Schwarz (born 1947), German rower
- Dietmar Seyferth (1929–2020), German-American chemist, Professor Emeritus of MIT
- Dietmar Vestweber (born 1956), biochemist & cell biologist, founding director of the Max-Planck-Institute for Molecular Biomedicine in Münster, Germany
- Dietmar Wittmann is an academic surgeon specializing in complex abdominal surgery
- Dietmar Wuttke (born 1978), German former footballer
- Dietmar Lampert (born 1966), Liechtenstein politician
- Gert-Dietmar Klause (born 1945), a former East German cross-country skier

== See also ==
- Dietmar-Hopp-Stadion, a football ground in Sinsheim, Baden-Württemberg, Germany
- Thietmar (disambiguation)
