= Bogota bag =

Sterile bag for closing abdominal wounds

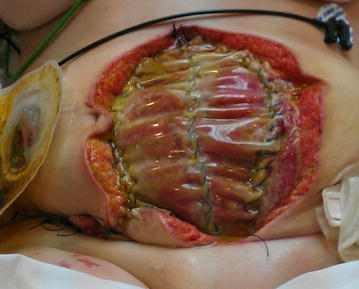
Bogota bag used in the treatment of abdominal compartment syndrome.

A Bogota bag is a sterile plastic bag used for closure of abdominal wounds. It is generally a sterilized 3-liter (0.66 imp gal; 0.79 U.S. gal) genitourinary irrigation bag that is sewn to the skin or fascia of the anterior abdominal wall. Its use was first described by Oswaldo Borraez while he was a resident in Bogotá, Colombia.

These temporary abdominal closure techniques are most commonly used in cases of abdominal compartment syndrome in which decompressive laparotomy is necessary to reduce intra-abdominal pressure to restore blood flow. The Bogota bag is used to postpone definite closure until the underlying cause of the elevated intra-abdominal pressure can be resolved. Other techniques include the use of absorbable mesh, the Wittmann patch, negative pressure wound therapy and dynamic closure systems. These techniques are characterized by a tension-free closure. In addition, the Bogota bag acts as a hermetic barrier that prevents disembowelment and loss of fluids. Another advantage to the Bogota bag is that the abdominal contents can be visually inspected which is particularly useful in cases of ischemic bowel.

The Bogota bag can be used in cases of "burst abdomen" following laparotomies, especially those using a midline vertical incision. Burst abdomen is usually characterized by a serosanguinous pink discharge from the wound 6 to 8 days after surgery.

== See also ==
- Instruments used in general surgery
