= Ditmar =

Ditmar may refer to:

== People with the surname ==
- Art Ditmar (1929–2021), American Major League Baseball pitcher
- Karl von Ditmar (1822–1892), Baltic German geologist and explorer
- Nikolay Fyodorovitch von Ditmar (1865–1919), Russian politician and businessman

== People with the given name ==
- Ditmar Jakobs (born 1953), German soccer player
- Ditmar Staffelt, member of the 16th German Bundestag

== See also ==
- Dietmar, a given name
- Ditmar Award, for Australian science fiction
- Ditmars (disambiguation)
- Dittmar, a surname
