= NO!art =

New York art movement

NO!art is a radical avant-garde anti-art movement started in New York in 1959. Its founders sought to deliver a shock to the complacent consumerist society around them.

== History ==
The movement was initiated by Boris Lurie, Sam Goodman and Stanley Fisher who had come together to organise exhibitions at the March Gallery. They gave the name NO!Art to the movement on the occasion of their show at the Gallery Gertrude Stein. They set themselves against the contemporary trends in Abstract Expressionism and Pop Art in art, and used their work to attack Fascism, racism and imperialism in politics.

The NO!art exhibitions bore titles such as the Doom Show, the Involvement Show, the No Show and the Vulgar Show. They were often scatological in theme with one exhibition, the 1964 No Sculptures/Shit Show, featuring works resembling piles of excrement. The Holocaust was another recurrent theme and the artists sometime provocatively referred to their work as "Jew Art."

In his essay “Bull by the Horns”, art critic Harold Rosenberg wrote “NO!art reflects the mixture of crap and crime with which the mass media floods the mind of our time. It is Pop with venom added.”

Since 1999, The NO!art was led by Dietmar Kirves (headquarters Berlin), and Clayton Patterson (headquarters New York). After the loss of Dietmar Kirves in 2024, Headquarters East is represented by LST, Lars Schubert, in Sitges, Spain.

== Members ==
Members included:

- Rocco Armento
- Isser Aronovici
- Enrico Baj
- Paolo Baratella
- Herb Brown
- Ronaldo Brunet
- Guenter Brus
- Al D'Arcangelo
- Aleksey Dayen
- Frank-Kirk Ehm-Marks
- Erró
- Klaus Fabricius
- Charles Gatewood
- Paul Georges
- Jochen Gerz
- Dorothie Gillespie
- Esther Morgenstern Gilman
- Amikam Goldman
- Leon Golub
- Blalla W. Hallmann
- Harry Hass
- Allan Kaprow
- Kommissar Hjuler (Detlev Hjuler) and Mama Baer (Andrea Katharina, Ingeborg Hjuler)
- Yayoi Kusama
- Konstantin K. Kuzminsky
- Jean-Jacques Lebel
- Martin Levitt
- Suzanne Long (Harriet Wood)
- LST (Lars Schubert)
- Enzo Mastrangelo
- Stu Mead
- Peter Meseck
- Lil Picard
- Leonid Pinchevsky
- Bernard Rancillac
- Francis Salles
- Naomi Tereza Salmon
- Reinhard Scheibner
- Bruno Schleinstein
- Dominik Stahlberg
- Michelle Stuart
- Aldo Tambellini
- Seth Tobocman
- Jean Toche
- Toyo Tsuchiya
- Wolf Vostell
- Friedrich Wall
- Mathilda Wolf
- Natalia E. Woytasik
- Miron Zownir

== External sources ==
- Official website
- Fletcher, Robert Beyond resistance: the future of freedom (chapter 'No!art Negative Aesthetics as Resistance to the Art of Forgetting')
- Boris Lurie, Leader of a Confrontational Art Movement, Dies at 83 Colin Moynihan, NY Times January 12, 2008
- First and Final Refusal - Resurrecting Boris Lurie, the Original NO!art Man Ezra Glinter, Forward, July 14, 2010
- Boris Lurie's NO!art and the Holocaust Jan Herman, Arts Journal Blog
- NO-Art: An American Psycho-Social Phenomenon Emanuel K. Schwartz and Reta Shacknove Schwartz, Leonardo, Vol. 4, No. 3 (Summer, 1971), pp. 245–254 MIT Press
- ArtCat - Soho - Westwood Gallery - Boris Lurie: NO!art. An Exhibition of Early Work
