= Dětmarovice =

- Municipality
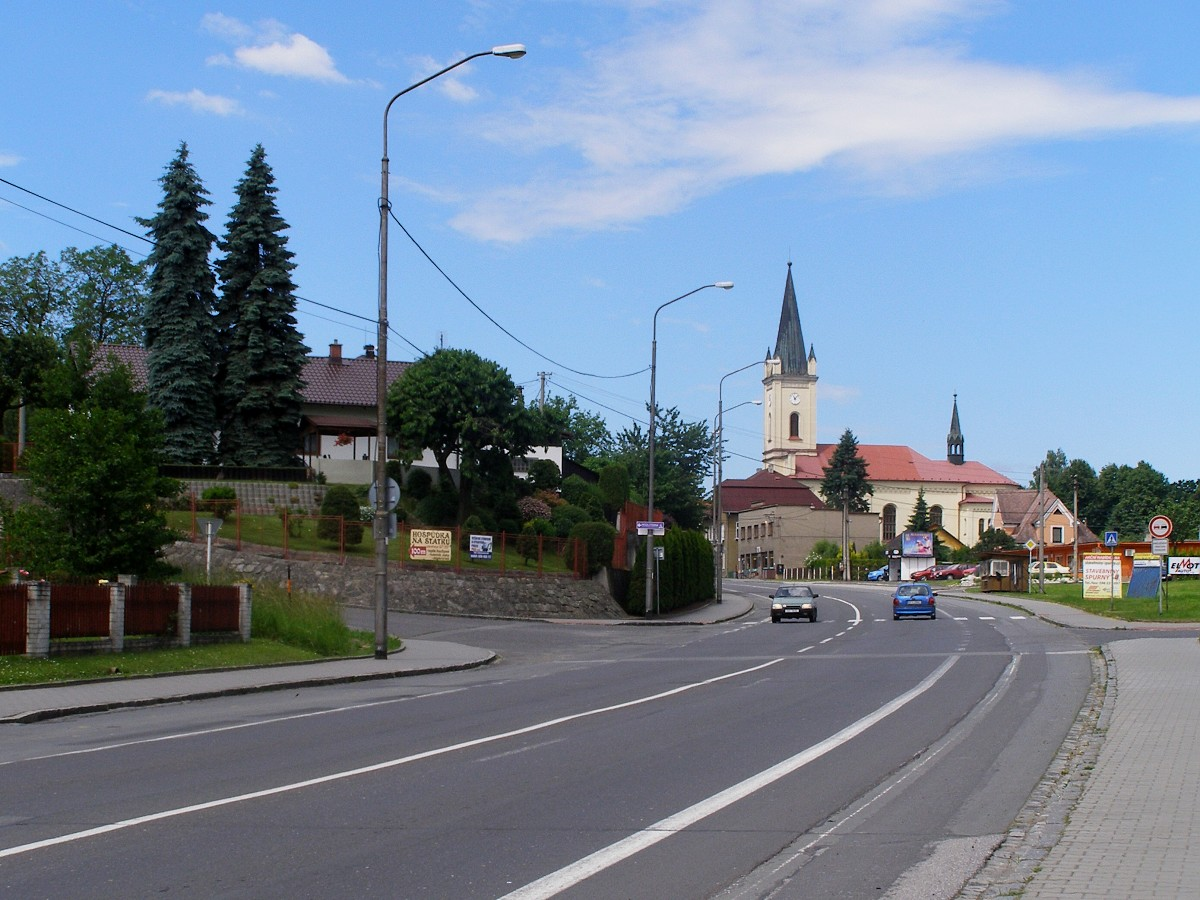
- Centre of Dětmarovice

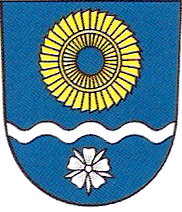
- Flag Coat of arms

- Location in the Czech Republic
- Coordinates: 49°53′39″N 18°27′39″E
- Country: Czech Republic
- Region: Moravian-Silesian
- District: Karviná
- First mentioned: 1305

Area
  - Total: 13.76 km^{2} (5.31 sq mi)
- Elevation: 214 m (702 ft)

Population (2026-01-01)
  - Total: 4,512
  - Density: 327.9/km^{2} (849.3/sq mi)
- Time zone: UTC+1 (CET)
  - Summer (DST): UTC+2 (CEST)
- Postal code: 735 71
- Website: www.detmarovice.cz

Dětmarovice (Czech pronunciation: [ˈɟɛtmarovɪtsɛ]; Polish: Dziećmorowice, German: Dittmarsdorf or Dittmannsdorf) is a municipality and village in Karviná District in the Moravian-Silesian Region of the Czech Republic. It has about 4,500 inhabitants.

== Administrative division ==
Dětmarovice consists of two municipal parts (in brackets population according to the 2021 census):

- Dětmarovice (3,884)
- Koukolná (231)

== Etymology ==
The name Dětmarovice is derived from German personal name Dietmar. It was first mentioned in Latin form Dithmari villa (1305), later as Dytmarsdorff (1392), Dietmarsdorf (1430), Dieczmarowicz[e] (1438, 1447), Dieczmiorowice (1652), Dittmersdorf/Dieczmorowitz (1736), Dittmansdorf/Dietmarowicze (1804) and Dittmannsdorf/Dětmarovice/Dziećmarowice (1900).

== Geography ==
Dětmarovice is located about 6 kilometres (4 mi) northwest of Karviná and 11 km (7 mi) northeast of Ostrava, on the border with Poland. It lies in the Ostrava Basin in the historical region of Cieszyn Silesia. The municipality is situated on the left bank of the Olza River.

== History ==
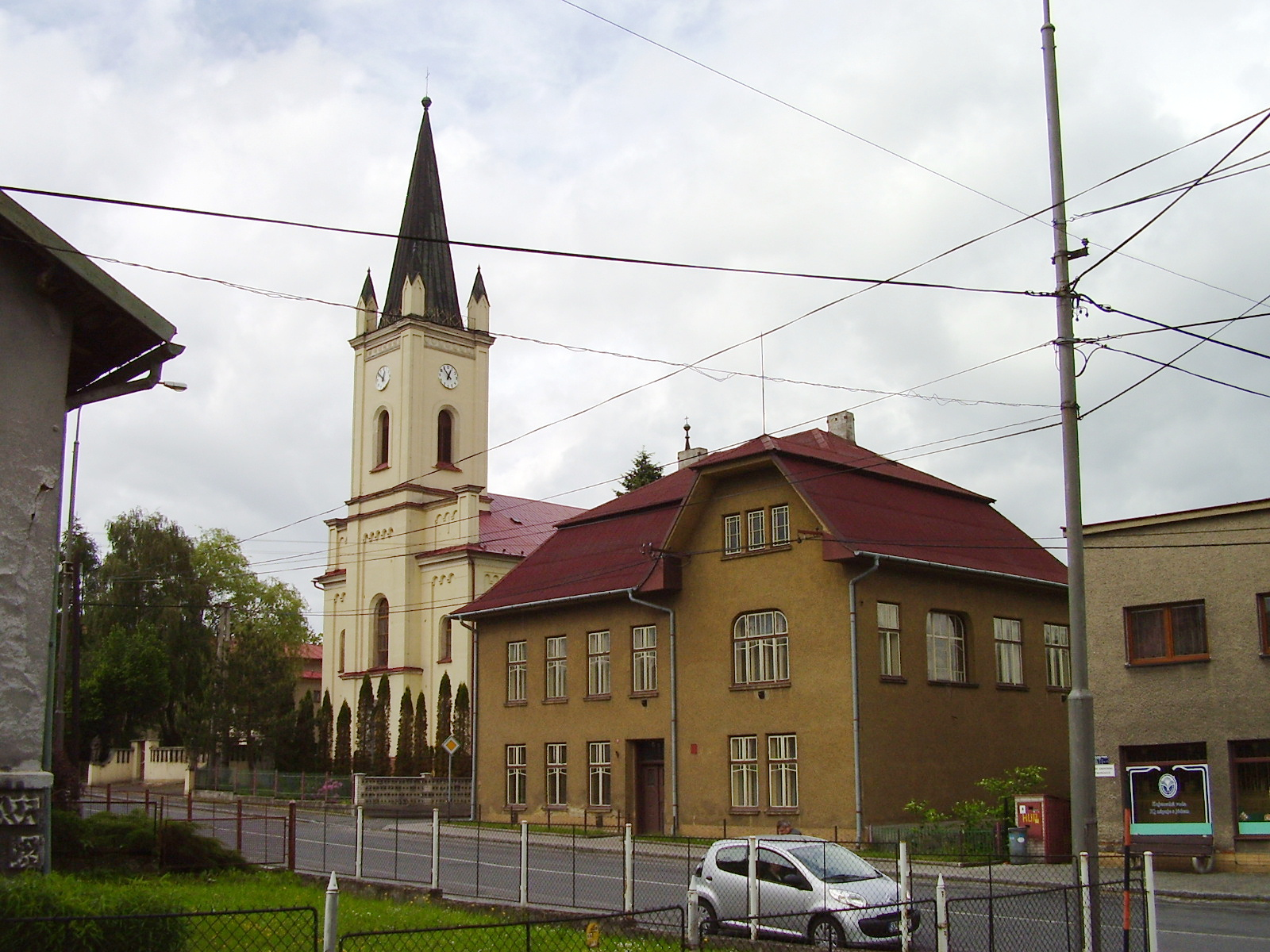
Church of Saint Mary Magdalene

According to some documents, Dětmarovice was mentioned as early as 1302, but these are unverified mentions. Officially the village was first mentioned in a Latin document of Diocese of Wrocław called Liber fundationis episcopatus Vratislaviensis from 1305. It was originally founded north of the present village, but after a great fire it was restored in its present location.

The village became a seat of a Catholic parish, mentioned in the register of Peter's Pence payment from 1447 among 50 parishes of Teschen deanery.

Politically the village belonged initially to the Duchy of Teschen, formed in 1290 in the process of feudal fragmentation of Poland and was ruled by a local branch of Piast dynasty. In 1327 the duchy became a fee of Kingdom of Bohemia, which after 1526 became part of the Habsburg monarchy. In 1573 it was sold as one of a dozen villages and the town of Freistadt and formed a state country split from the Duchy of Teschen.

The village was bought in 1792 by Jan Larisch who joined it with its Karviná properties. It was owned by the Larisch family until 1927.

After Revolutions of 1848 in the Austrian Empire a modern municipal division was introduced in the re-established Austrian Silesia. The village as a municipality was subscribed in 1869 to the newly established Freistadt political district and Oderberg legal district, but before 1890 the municipality was transferred to Freistadt legal district.

The first written mention of Koukolná is from 1447. It was a separate municipality until 1872–1875, when it was merged with Dětmarovice.

According to the censuses conducted in 1880–1910, the population of the municipality grew from 1,769 in 1880 to 3,453 in 1910. In three censuses majority were Czech-speakers (84.9% in 1880, 64% in 1890, 77.1% in 1910, 12.5% minority in 1900), in 1900 majority were Polish-speakers (86.7%, in other censuses minority: 13.9% in 1880, 34.6% in 1890, 21.8% in 1910). They were accompanied by German-speaking minority (between 0.8% and 1.4%). In terms of religion in 1910, the majority were Roman Catholics (98.2%), followed by Jews (0.9%) and Protestants (0.6%).

After World War I, Polish–Czechoslovak War and the division of Cieszyn Silesia in 1920, the village became a part of Czechoslovakia. Following the Munich Agreement, in October 1938 together with the Trans-Olza region it was annexed by Poland, administratively organised in Frysztat County of Silesian Voivodeship. The municipality was then annexed by Nazi Germany at the beginning of World War II. After the war it was restored to Czechoslovakia.

== Demographics ==
Historical population

Year	Pop.	±%
1869	1,380	—
1880	1,769	+28.2%
1890	2,151	+21.6%
1900	2,784	+29.4%
1910	3,453	+24.0%

Year	Pop.	±%
1921	3,437	−0.5%
1930	4,118	+19.8%
1950	3,692	−10.3%
1961	4,001	+8.4%
1970	4,079	+1.9%

Year	Pop.	±%
1980	3,817	−6.4%
1991	3,526	−7.6%
2001	3,783	+7.3%
2011	3,953	+4.5%
2021	4,115	+4.1%

Source: Censuses

== Economy ==
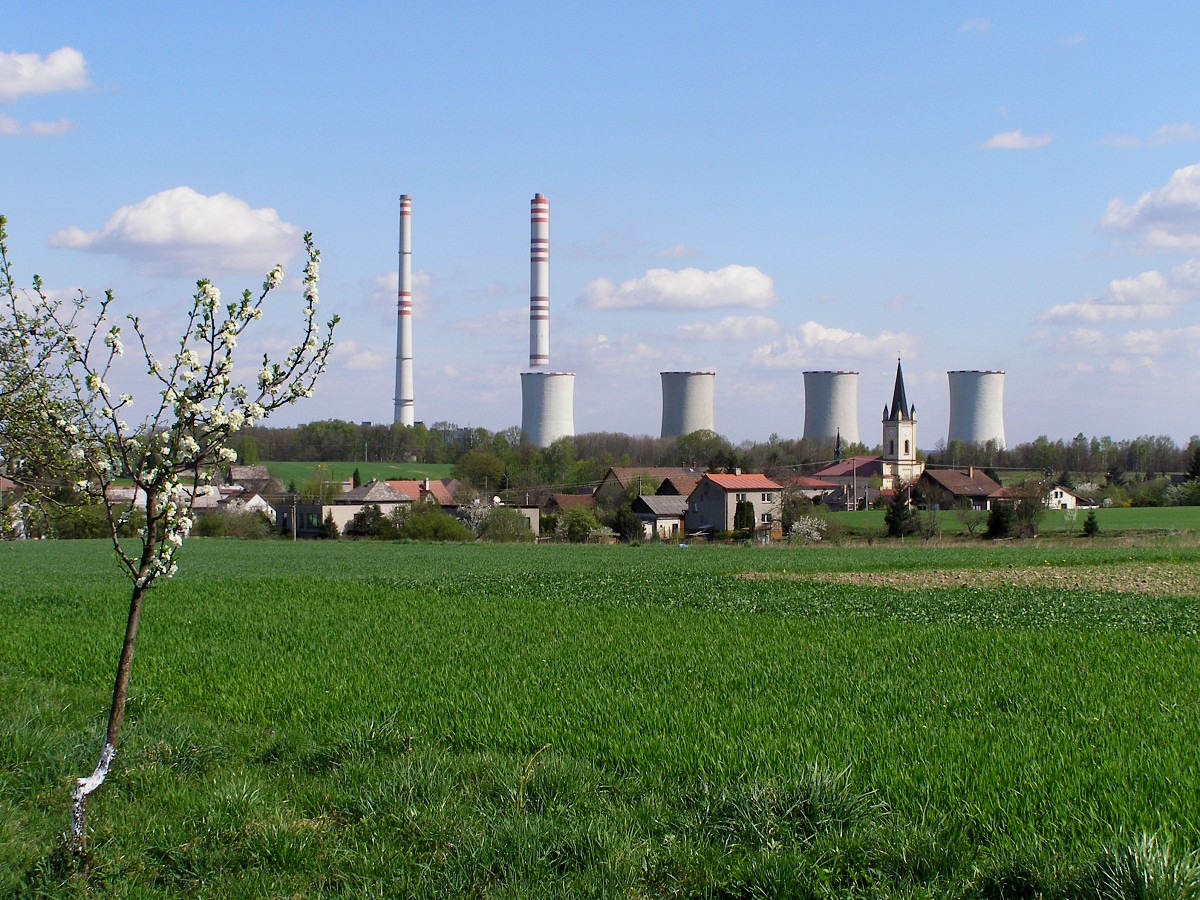
Dětmarovice power plant

There is a large power station in the municipality owned by ČEZ Group. It was built in 1971–1976. It was the only large thermal power station in the country burning bituminous coal. In 1998, a filter reducing the air pollution was installed. Burning bituminous coal ended in 2025, when the power plant switched to burning biomass and natural gas.

== Transport ==
The I/67 road from Český Těšín to Bohumín passes through the municipality.

Dětmarovice is located on the main railway line from Prague/Vienna to Warsaw. Another important line to Český Těšín–Žilina–Košice splits here from the line to Warsaw. The passenger transport is provided on the line Ostrava–Mosty u Jablunkova. The power station is connected to the railway.

== Sport ==
The municipality hosted the start of the first stage of the 2012 and 2013 Gracia-Orlová.

== Sights ==
Historical landmarks include the Něbroj's chapel, built around 1860, and the Church of Saint Mary Magdalene, built in Neo-Romanesque style in 1869–1870.

== Notable people ==
- Inge Bauer (born 1940), German pentathlete
