= Wagner College =

Private college in Staten Island, New York, US

- Former name: Lutheran Proseminary of Rochester (1883–1886)
- Type: Private university
- Established: 1883; 143 years ago
- Religious affiliation: Evangelical Lutheran Church in America
- Academic affiliations: CIC; NAICU
- Endowment: $100.5 million (2024)
- President: Jeffrey Doggett
- Faculty: 45 full-time, 100 part-time (2026)
- Students: 1,932 (2023)
- Undergraduates: 1,592 (2023)
- Postgraduates: 340 (2023)
- Location: Staten Island, New York, United States; 40.615°N 74.094°W
- Campus: 105 acres (42 ha)
- Colors: Green and white
- Nickname: Seahawks
- Sporting affiliations: NCAA Division I – NEC – MAAC – USA Triathlon
- Website: wagner.edu

Wagner College is a private college in Staten Island, New York, United States. It was established in 1883 and, as of the 2023–2024 academic year, it enrolled approximately 1,932 students, including 1,592 undergraduates and 340 graduates. The institution is accredited by the Middle States Commission on Higher Education.

== History ==
Wagner College was founded in 1883 in Rochester, New York, as the Lutheran Proseminary of Rochester. Its purpose was to prepare young men for admission to Lutheran seminaries and to ensure that they were sufficiently fluent in both English and German to minister to the large German immigrant community of that day. The school's six-year curriculum (covering the high-school and junior-college years) was modeled on the German gymnasium curriculum. In 1886, the school was renamed Wagner Memorial Lutheran College, after a building in Rochester was purchased for its use by John G. Wagner in memory of his son.

In 1918, at the behest of then-college president Frederick Sutter, the college moved to the 38-acre (15 ha) former Cunard estate on Grymes Hill, Staten Island. An Italianate villa called Westwood, the Cunard mansion (c. 1851), is extant (now Cunard Hall), as is the neighboring former hotel annex that was built in 1905 (initially named North Hall, now called Reynolds House). The college soon expanded to 57 acres (23 ha) after it acquired the neighboring Jacob Vanderbilt estate in 1922. In the 1920s, the curriculum began to move toward an American-style liberal arts curriculum that was solidified when the state of New York granted the college degree-granting status in 1928. The college admitted women in 1933 and introduced graduate programs in 1951. The college expanded further when it purchased the W. G. Ward estate in 1949 (current site of Wagner College Stadium), and again in 1993, when the college acquired the adjacent property of the former Augustinian Academy, which has largely remained wooded green space and athletic fields. The campus now occupies 105 acres (42 ha) on the hill and has views of the New York Harbor, the Verrazzano Bridge, Downtown Brooklyn, and Lower Manhattan.

In April 1981, faculty members at the college went on strike, with The New York Times reporting that union recognition was the primary cause of the labor dispute. The strike was led by the Wagner College Faculty Association, a local union of the AFL-CIO-affiliated New York State United Teachers. At the time, 54 of the college's 83 full-time faculty members were part of the union. As part of the strike, they picketed outside of the entrances to the college's Grymes Hill campus. The strike lasted 20 days and ended on April 22 with the college agreeing to recognize the union.

The college further expanded in May 2026 when it purchased the former Staten Island campus of St. John's University which had been vacated in 2024, with a $35 million loan from the Dormitory Authority of the State of New York. At the same time Wagner College terminated 40 percent of the faculty and eliminated almost all liberal arts programs.

== New York City Writers Conference ==
From 1956 through the late 1960s, Wagner College was the home of the New York City Writers Conference, which brought some of the leading lights of the literary world to campus each summer. Instructors included Saul Bellow, Robert Lowell, Edward Albee, Kay Boyle and Kenneth Koch. From 1961 to 1963, while English professor Willard Maas directed the conference, it served as a training ground for poets of the New York School.

Maas himself was a significant figure in the New York avant-garde world of the 1950s and 1960s; Edward Albee used Maas and his wife, experimental filmmaker Marie Menken, as the models for his lead characters in the early masterwork, Who's Afraid of Virginia Woolf?

The Stanley Drama Award, which began as a prize given at the conclusion of the NYC Writers Conference, has provided encouragement for several notable playwrights, including: Terrence McNally for This Side of the Door (1962), an early version of "And Things that Go Bump in the Night"; Adrienne Kennedy for Funnyhouse of a Negro (1963); Lonne Elder III for an early version of Ceremonies in Dark Old Men (1965), and Jonathan Larson in 1993 for an early version of Rent.

== Campus ==
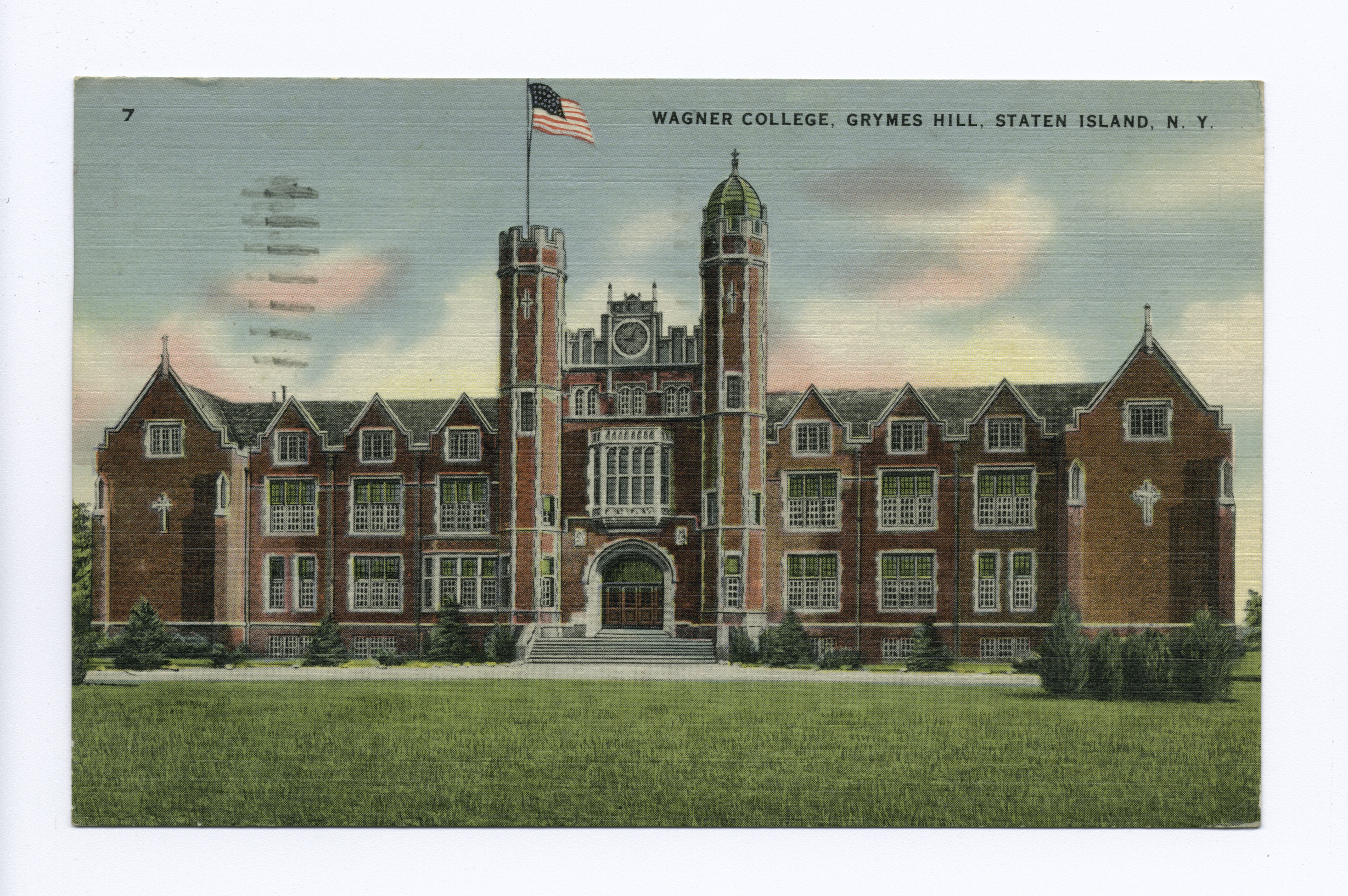
Early 20th century postcard

Prominent early buildings include Cunard Hall (ca. 1851); Reynolds House (1905); Kairos House (1918), a Craftsman Style cottage; and Main Hall (1930, restored 2012) and Parker Hall (1923), built in the Collegiate Gothic style. Main Hall provides classroom and office space and a theater auditorium. Parker Hall, first built as a dormitory, is used for faculty offices.

Two cottages built in the early 1920s provide administrative space for the institution's Campus Safety and Lifelong Learning offices.

Three dormitory facilities were constructed during the college's major building drive in the middle of the twentieth century: Guild Hall (1951), Parker Towers (1964) and Harbor View Hall (1969), later complemented by Foundation Hall (2010), a residence hall for upperclassmen. About two-thirds of undergraduates live on campus.

Another dormitory building, Campus Hall (1957), now provides classroom and office space.

The Horrmann Library (1961) contains over 200,000 volumes and holds the collection and personal papers of poet Edwin Markham.

The Megerle Science Building and Spiro Hall were opened in 1968, followed by the Wagner Union in 1970.

Two building projects have expanded earlier structures. In 1999, a significant expansion of the 1951 Sutter Gymnasium created the modern Spiro Sports Center. And in 2002, a pair of Prairie Style cottages constructed around 1905 were refurbished and joined by a bridge building into Pape Admissions House.

Three substantial resources on the physical history of the Wagner College campus have been published:

1. "Founding Faces & Places: An Illustrated History Of Wagner Memorial Lutheran College, 1869–1930," first published for Wagner College's 125th anniversary commemoration in 2008,
2. "Wagner College Memories: A Photographic Remembrance of Grymes Hill" (2011), and
3. "Wagner College History Tour," a three-part series published in the Winter 2015–2016, Fall 2016 and Summer 2017 issues of Wagner Magazine.

In May 2026 the college acquired the former Staten Island campus of St. John's University and plans to being using the new campus in the fall.

== Rankings ==
In the 2025 edition of U.S. News & World Report's Best Colleges, Wagner College was ranked #60 in Regional Universities North (tie) and #49 in Best Value Schools. The college's theater program was ranked #2 in The Princeton Review's 2025 rankings.

== Athletics ==
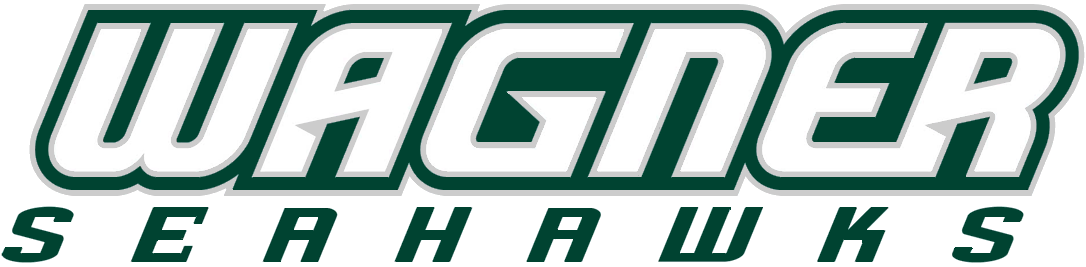
Wagner athletics wordmark

Wagner College offers athletic scholarships and competes at the NCAA Division I level in all intercollegiate athletics. Football competes at the NCAA Division I FCS – formerly I-AA – level.

Wagner is a member of the Northeast Conference. Men's varsity intercollegiate teams are fielded in 10 sports: baseball, basketball, cross country, football, golf, lacrosse, tennis, and track & field (indoor and outdoor) and men's water polo, which was established in fall 2016. Women's varsity intercollegiate teams are fielded in 14 sports: basketball, cross country, golf, lacrosse, soccer, softball, swimming & diving, tennis, track & field (indoor and outdoor), and water polo, in addition to three newly added sports in fencing (2016), triathlon (2018) and field hockey, which was reinstated in 2018.

== Photos ==
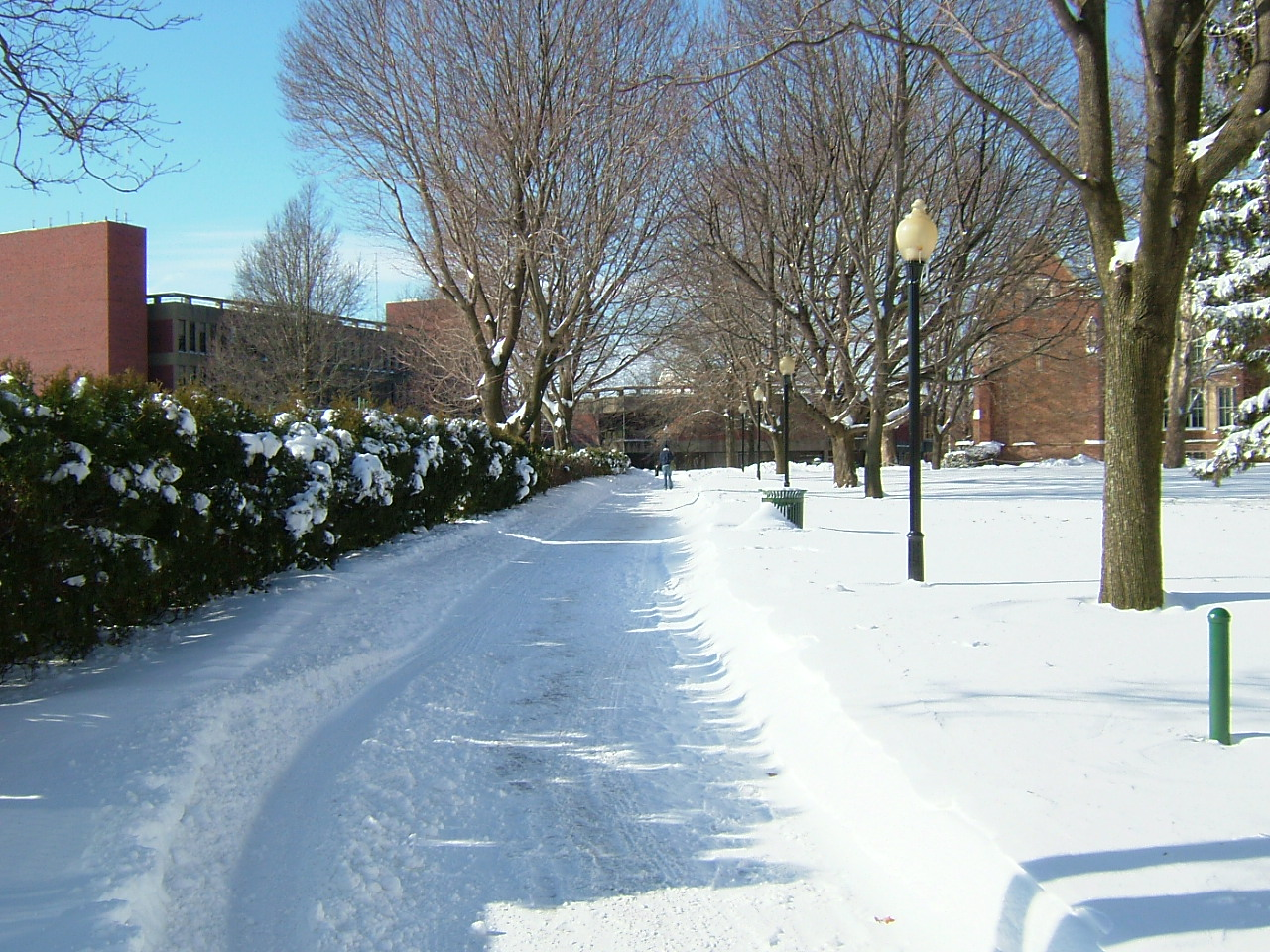
A pedestrian walkway on campus after a fresh snow storm

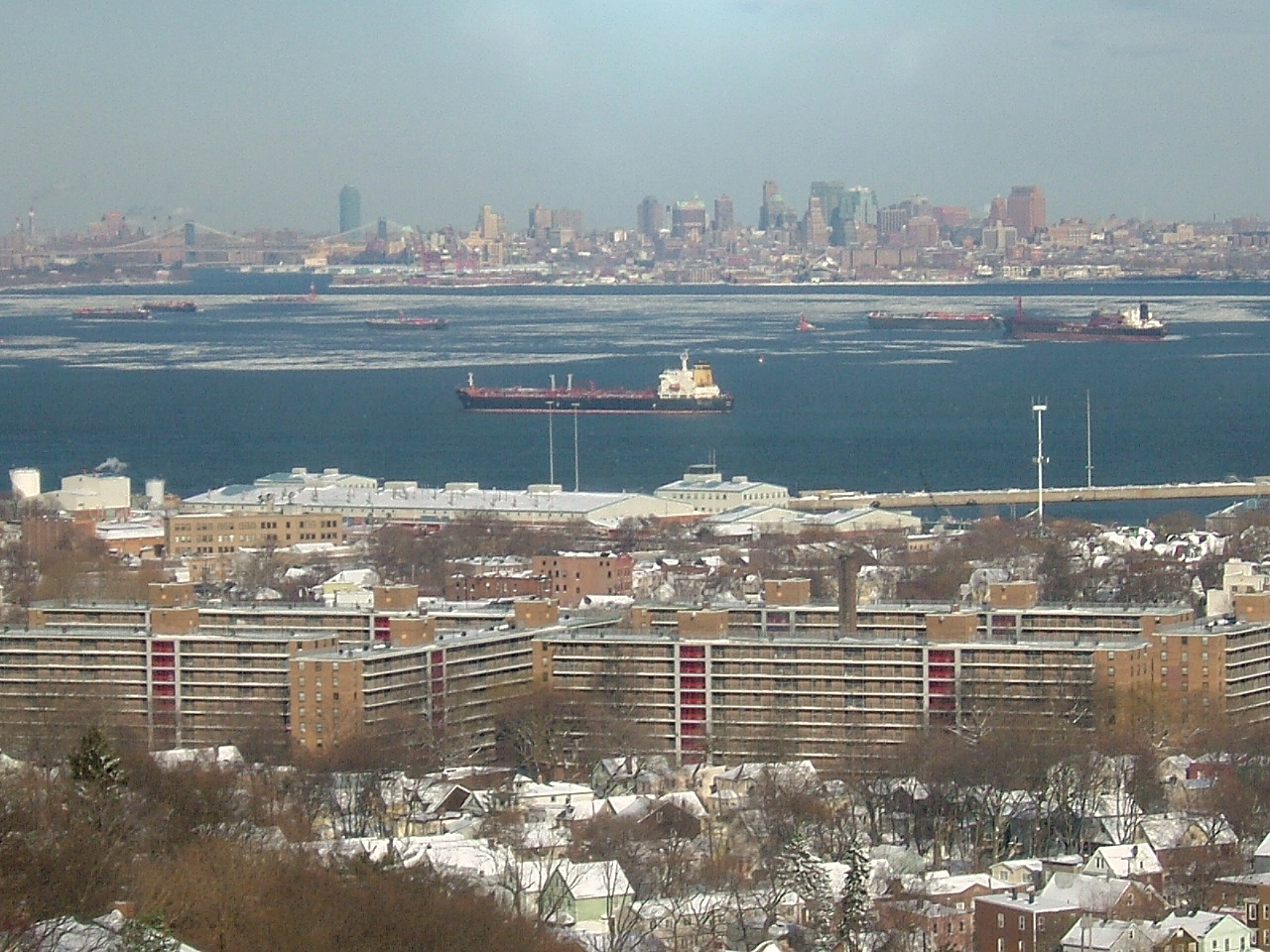
View from residence hall: Downtown Brooklyn and Brooklyn Br.

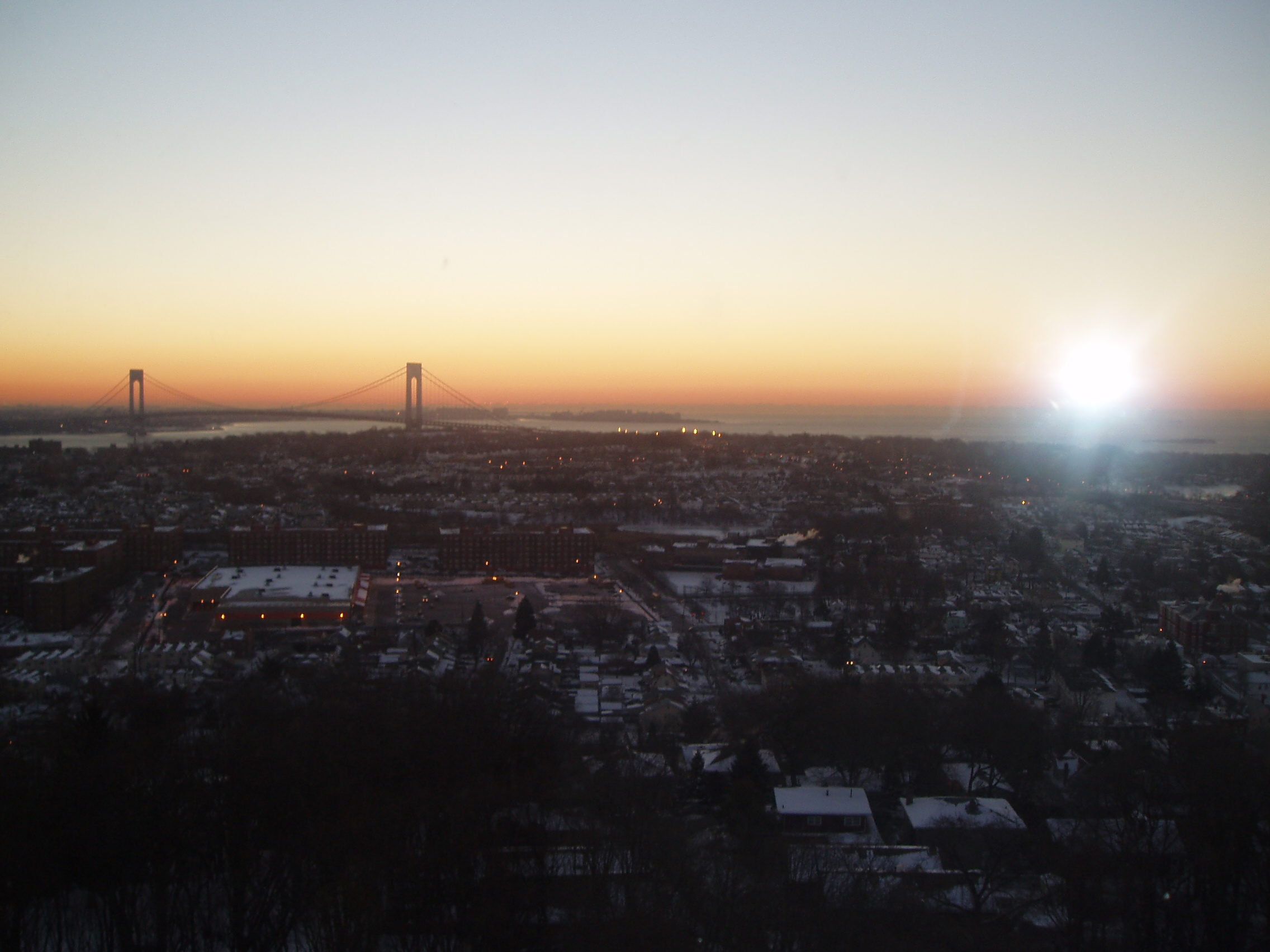
View from residence hall: Verrazzano–Narrows Br. and Atlantic Ocean

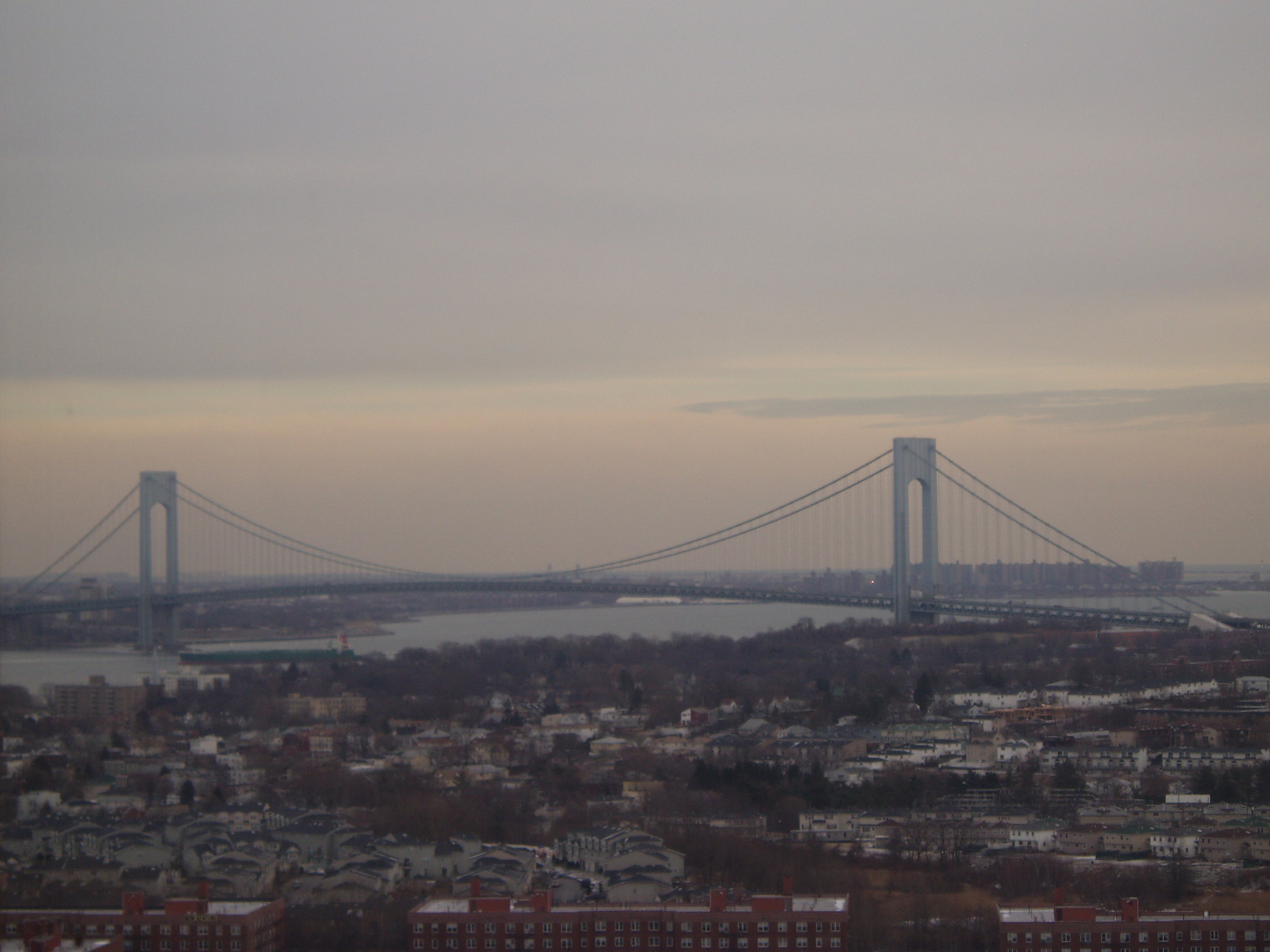
Verrazzano–Narrows Br. from Harborview Residence Hall

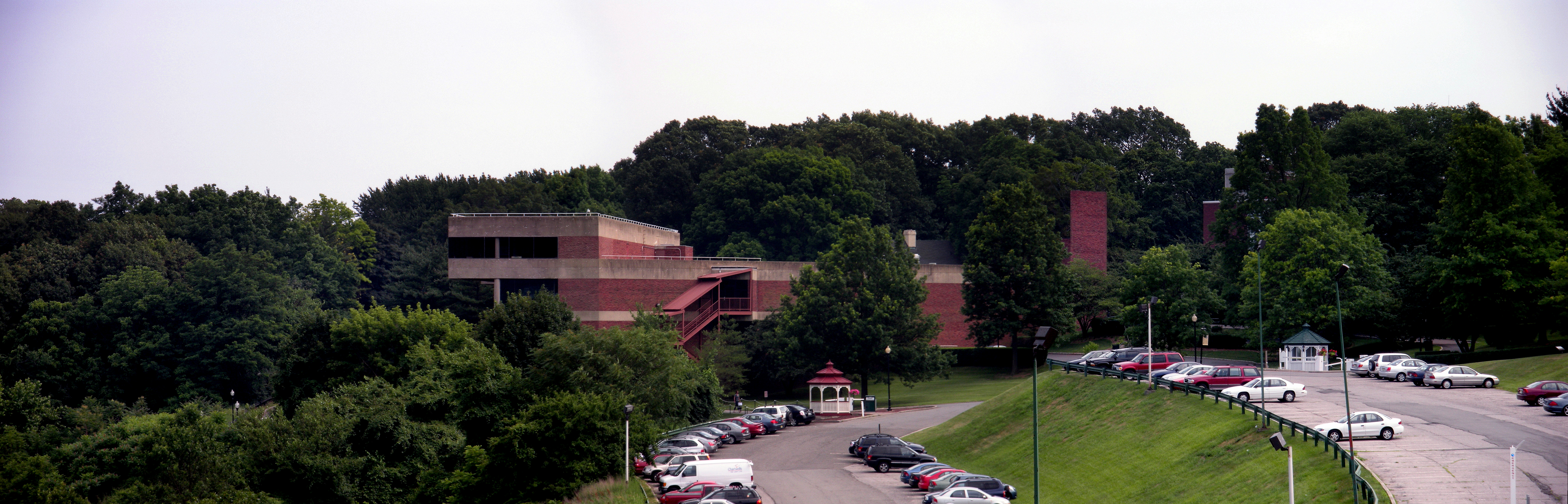
A panorama of the Wagner Union building

== Notable alumni ==
- Lou Anarumo, professional football coach
- Dawn Aponte, football executive
- Rocco Armento, American sculptor, painter, and member of the NO!art movement
- Andrew Bailey, professional baseball player and coach
- Francis P. Baldwin, former Exxon chief scientist
- Bob Beckel, political commentator and analyst on the Fox News Channel
- Peter L. Berger, sociologist and theologian
- Jedediah Bila, author and political pundit
- Curt Blefary, professional baseball player
- Alex Boniello, actor
- Kathy Brier, actor
- Molly Burnett, actor
- Lillian G. Burry, politician
- Tim Capstraw, professional basketball announcer and college basketball and baseball coach
- Jim Carroll, author, poet, autobiographer, and punk musician
- Brad Corbett, owner of Texas Rangers, 1974–1980
- Edwin-Michael Cortez, library and information science dean
- Jeff Currey, politician
- Piotr Czech, professional football kicker
- Damien Demento (Phil Theis), wrestler
- Fred Espenak, astronomer
- Claire Fagin, nurse educator, pioneer of family-centered care, first female president of an Ivy League university
- Carmine Giovinazzo, actor
- Allan L. Goldstein, authority on the thymus gland and the workings of the immune system
- Randy Graff, actor
- Betsy Joslyn, actor
- Friedrich Katz, anthropologist and historian
- Rich Kotite, professional football coach
- Robert Litzenberger, professor emeritus at the University of Pennsylvania
- Robert Loggia, actor
- Alicia Luciano, Miss New Jersey 2002
- Janine LaManna, actress
- Donna Lupardo, politician
- Gerard Malanga, poet and Andy Warhol collaborator
- Nicole Malliotakis, politician
- Arno Minkkinen, Finnish-American photographer
- Kenneth Mitchell, politician
- Guy Molinari, politician
- Dan Mullen, college football coach
- Amy Polumbo, former Miss New Jersey (2007–2008)
- Carl-Olivier Primé, professional football player
- Morgan Riddle, American internet personality
- Greg Senat, professional football player
- Julian Stanford, professional football player
- Cam Gill, professional football player
- Lynne Stewart, civil rights lawyer
- Philip S. Straniere, civil court judge
- Robert Straniere, politician
- Armin Thurnher, journalist
- Beverly Hoehne Whipple, sexologist
- Brian Whitman, radio talk show host
- Paul Zindel, author and playwright
- James D. Ford, former Chaplain of the United States House of Representatives
- Nick Rochefort, comedian

== Filming location ==
Wagner's campus has been featured in several films, television-show episodes, and advertisements. Shoot dates (where shown) are from Wagner College location contracts on file on campus:

- "Silent Madness," 1984 film
- "Naked in New York," 1993 film
- "Cadaverous," 2000 short film
- "The Sopranos," Ep. 39, "Army of One," 2001. Wagner College was used for the Hudson Military Institute campus.
- "The Education of Max Bickford," 2001. CBS drama series starring Richard Dreyfuss and Marcia Gay Harden. Wagner College (along with Brooklyn College) was the fictional Chadwick College.
- "School of Rock," 2003 film starring Jack Black and Joan Cusack. The Horace Green School exterior portrayed in the movie is Wagner College's Main Hall.
- "Poster Boy," 2004 film which won the Outfest Grand Jury Award for Best Screenwriting.
- "Four Lane Highway," 2005 film (shot on campus April 18, 2004)
- "Exposing the Order of the Serpentine," 2006 film (shot on campus Jan. 5–6, 2005)
- "Illegal Tender," 2007 film (shot on campus May 25–26, 2006)
- "The Visitor," 2007 film distributed by Overture Films (shot on campus Oct. 9, 2006)
- "Comedy Central on Campus: Starring Christian Finnegan" (shot on campus Dec. 6, 2006)
- "Little New York" (orig. title "Staten Island)"), 2009 independent film starring Ethan Hawke and Vincent D'Onofrio (shot on campus May 2 and June 8, 2007)
- "Rescue Me," TV series, "Play" (S5, E7, 2009) (shot on campus July 11, 2008)
- "Law & Order: Special Victims Unit," TV series, "Swing" (S10, E3, 2008) (shot on campus Sept. 4–9, 2008)
- "Law & Order: Special Victims Unit," TV series, "Lunacy" (S10, E4, 2008) (shot on campus Sept. 4–9, 2008)
- "An Invisible Sign," 2010 film (shot on campus July 18–19, 2009)
- "You Don't Know Jack," 2010 made-for-TV biopic (shot on campus Sept. 17–21, 2009)
- "AmeriQua" (also titled "Eurotrapped"), a 2013 film featuring Alessandra Mastronardi (shot on campus Dec. 4, 2010)
- "Law & Order: Special Victims Unit," TV series, "Gridiron Soldier" (S15, E16, 2014) (shot on campus March 5, 2014)
- "The Rewrite," 2014 film starring Hugh Grant and Marisa Tomei (shot on campus 2013)
- "Mayhem: We're Going to the Playoffs!" Allstate TV ad (shot on campus Aug. 27, 2016)
- "Crashing," HBO series, "NACA" (S2, E7, 2018) (shot on campus Aug. 11, 2017)
- "Jimmy," Clear biometric ID system commercial (2019) (shot on campus Aug. 25 & 26, 2018)
- "Bull," CBS TV series, "Behind the Ivy" (S4, E12, 2020). Filmed on campus November 18, 2019.
- "The King of Staten Island" (2020), loosely biographical film based on life of film's lead, Pete Davidson, directed by Judd Apatow. Filmed on campus June 10–17, 2019<

== See also ==
- Timeline of strikes in 1981
