= Ricky Porter =

American football player, coach, and administrator (born 1960)

No. 46, 20, 26
- Position: Running back

Personal information
- Born: January 14, 1960 (age 66); Sylacauga, Alabama, U.S.
- Listed height: 5 ft 10 in (1.78 m)
- Listed weight: 198 lb (90 kg)

Career information
- High school: Milford Mill Academy (Baltimore, Maryland)
- College: Slippery Rock
- NFL draft: 1982: 12th round, 319th overall pick

Career history

Playing
- Detroit Lions (1982); Philadelphia Eagles (1983)*; Baltimore Colts (1983); Memphis Showboats (1985); Montreal Alouettes (1986); Buffalo Bills (1987)
- * Offseason or practice squad member only

Coaching
- Tampa Bay Buccaneers (1996) Offensive assistant; Denver Broncos (1997–1999) Offensive assistant

Operations
- New Orleans Saints (2000–2007) Director of player development

Awards and highlights
- 2× Super Bowl champion (XXXII, XXXIII)

Career NFL statistics
- Rushing yards: 177
- Rushing average: 3.8
- Receptions: 9
- Receiving yards: 70
- Stats at Pro Football Reference

Richard Anthony Porter (born January 14, 1960) is an American former professional football player who was a running back in the National Football League (NFL), United States Football League (USFL), and Canadian Football League (CFL).
