= Aldo Tambellini =

Italian-American artist (1930–2020)

- Born: 29 April 1930; Syracuse, New York, US
- Died: 12 November 2020 (aged 90); Cambridge, Massachusetts, US
- Education: Syracuse University and Notre Dame
- Occupation: Artist
- Website: http://www.aldotambellini.com and Aldo Tambellini Art Foundation www.aldotambellini.org

Aldo Tambellini (29 April 1930 – 12 November 2020) was an Italian-American artist. He pioneered electronic intermedia, and was a painter, sculptor, and poet. He died at age 90, in November 2020.

== Childhood ==
Aldo Tambellini was born in Syracuse, New York, the second child of an Italian-Brazilian father, John Tambellini, and an Italian mother. At the age of 18 months his mother legally separated from his father. This prompted John Tambellini to move the family from Syracuse back to Italy, to the township of Lucca in Tuscany. He then returned to New York, and Aldo Tambellini saw him only when he visited Lucca. Tambellini grew up in Italy speaking Italian. His paternal grandfather, Paul Tambellini, was a coffee plantation owner in São Paulo, Brazil who later retired to Lucca. His maternal grandfather was a socialist who worked in a foundry, building railroad cars. Tambellini grew up primarily with his family on his mother's side, who came from Massa province in Tuscany.

He showed early promise in fine arts as a child, drawing and painting with great skill at the age of 3. At the age of 5 Tambellini's mother gave him his first battery-operated Lanterna Magica projector. He loved both music and art, singing as a child and listening to the radio frequently. When he reached the age of 10 he entered grammar school, where his mother had to choose between art and music for his specialisation. She chose the local arts school, A. Passaglia Art Institute (not far from where Puccini had lived). There he studied art history and fine arts. Shortly after, Italy under Mussolini entered World War II as an ally of the Nazi regime, interrupting Tambellini's studies, but making an indelible impression on his artistic process.

During the 6 January 1944 raid on Italy, Tambellini was out of the house riding his bikes. Soon, bombs hit Lucca. Tambellini survived the attack unscathed, later recalling that bombs dropped five feet from him as he lay in the street. His family also survived, with two bombs in the backyard failing to detonate. 21 of his neighbors and friends perished that day. Tambellini notes that his mother never fully recovered emotionally. His family then moved further north to Guamo, a hamlet of nearby Capannori. Guamo was occupied by German youth soldiers during this time. In an interview with Femficatio, Tambellini discusses a particular young German soldier who liked art and used to admire his watercolors, and who also shared his feelings: "He didn't like the war either."

At the end of the war, Guamo was liberated by Buffalo Soldiers (African-American GIs), which also influenced his art. After Lucca was liberated, Tambellini was able to return there and finish his studies at the Art Institute. There, Tambellini volunteered to paint the scenery for, and act in a play written by Italian Veterans at the hospital in Lucca. Tambellini also painted a mural for the American GI Club.

== Early life ==
As he was born in America, Tambellini had birthright citizenship in America. Earlier in the war, his older brother, also an American citizen, was drafted into the U.S. Army. At the age of 16, Tambellini moved to New York City with his mother, speaking very little English. Tambellini first learned of his parents' official separation on arriving in New York. He then took care of his mother who had developed extreme paranoia and other neuroses due to the war.

Tambellini took a series of odd jobs, picking potatoes with migrant workers and painting gasoline tanks in Oil City in Syracuse, New York. While stepping on wet paint, he slipped toward the tank's unsecured edges and stopped a few inches from a sixty-foot drop – a plunge that could have killed him. After that, Tambellini enrolled in a local vocational college to learn English. While there, he won numerous prizes and awards in art.

Shortly after, at the age of 17, Tambellini prepared his portfolio and met with Lee Brown Coye (illustrator of "Weird Tales") at the Syracuse Museum. Coye was an instructor in painting there. After reviewing Tambellini's work, he recommended him to Anna Holmstead, the director of the museum that hired Tambellini to teach painting. He was the youngest faculty member on staff.

At 18, Tambellini joined VEDET, which consisted of artists Hilton Kramer (who later became conservative critic for The New York Times) and James Kleege. There, Tambellini applied for a four-year scholarship to the University of Syracruse. With only two scholarships offered, Tambellini secured one in their prestigious BFA program. After receiving his BFA, he took a teaching position at the Rosary Hill College in Buffalo, New York, and then received a teaching fellowship from the University of Oregon where he matriculated. After a year, he transferred to another teaching fellowship at Notre Dame, where he studied sculpture with Ivan Meštrović. He received his MFA from Notre Dame in 1959.

== Lower East Side artists ==
After completing his MFA, Tambellini moved to the Lower East Side, Manhattan, where he rented a studio above a shop for $56.00 a month. There, he entered the art scene as a professional artist and founded major artistic movements and held principal membership in other historic artistic movements during the 1960s and 1970s post-war arts scene.

In 1962, Tambellini was a founding member of a counter-culture group called Group Center, which worked to find creative ways to display non-mainstream work. Other founding members include Ron Hahne, Elsa Tambellini, Don Snyder, and Ben Morea. Notable members who came on board later were Jackie Cassen and Peter Martinez. A major group highlighting the intermedia genre, "Group Center" combined poetry, photography, choreography and film-making. In a flyer distributed by the Group highlighting its intentions it read:

"For the purpose of forming a community of the arts, of individuals and groups, of poets, actors, dancers, painters, musicians, photographers, sculptors, film-makers, and all those vitally interested in the creative expression of man.... We believe that the artistic community has reached a new stage of development. In a mobile society, it is no longer sufficient for the creative individual to remain in isolation. We feel the hunger of a society lost in its own vacuum and rise with an open active commitment to forward a new spirit for mankind."

— Group Center Leaflets

In Group Center, Tambellini first began to work with "black" as a theme, which came to define his artistic expression. Beginning as an avant-garde filmmaker, in 1965 Tambellini began to paint directly on film, a technique he pioneered, thus beginning his "Black Film Series." Shortly after, with a second-hand Bolex camera, Tambellini shot several experimental films, one of which, "Black TV", won the International Grand Prix at the Oberhausen Film Festival in 1969.

As well as his involvement in Group Center, Tambellini worked closely with the Umbra poetry collective. Tambellini was close friends at the time with N. H. Pritchard, but later became friends with Tom Dent (founding member of Umbra who met across from Tambellini's studio), as well as Askia Touré, Ishmael Reed and Brenda Walcott. There, through his collaboration with the black activist literary community, Tambellini pushed the bounds of intermedia to moving electromedia shows that involved him painting directly onto cellulose slides that were run through a projector; accompanied by a dancer, jazz, and poetry. His electromedia performances often included the poetry and voice of Calvin C. Hernton, as in the case with his work, Black Zero. These performances evolved over time, each show building upon the next. The first core team, including poets N. H. Pritchard and Ishmael Reed, and dancer Carla Blank. presented Black at Columbia University's International House in 1965. Tambellini considered these collaborations a work-in-progress, and with various titles, including "Moondial (1966)," with dancer Beverly Schmidt, "Black Zero" and "Black2", were presented with a changing cast of musicians, poets and dancers. These shows brought Tambellini to prominence, with the Herald Tribune remarking that this was "Tambellini's Rebellion in Art Form".

In 2009, Performa 09, the NYC performance biennial, hosted a memorable recreation of Black Zero at White Box (34 years after it premiered at the Astor Playhouse in 1965) featuring William Parker and Hill Greene on double basses and Ben Morea on clamorous machines, among others. In 2011, the Chelsea Art Museum was host to yet another recreation of Black Zero, as part of Tambellini's museum retrospective there. Both performances were produced by Swiss conceptual artist Christoph Draeger, who invited bass legend Henry Grimes to join this time. The musical improvisations accompany simultaneous slide- and film projections by Aldo Tambellini and his team of eight performers, and sound recordings by the late Calvin Hernton's radical poetry. The 2012 re-creation at the Tate Tanks of the 1965 Astor Playhouse performance in New York City noted the many Group Center artists involved—with Aldo Tambellini and Elsa Tambellini on projectors, Ben Morea on the clamorous machines, Ron Hahne on the spiral machine, Bill Dixon playing the horn, Alan Silva bass, and Calvin C. Hernton's recorded poetry and voice.

In 1966, Tambellini founded The Gate Theater in New York's East Village, which showed experimental films once a week. Nam June Paik and Hollywood director Brian de Palma's first films were shown in Tambellini's theater, the only avant-garde experimental theater to show independent films of the time. In 1967, he co-founded a second theater, the Black Gate with Otto Piene, which primarily showed electromedia performances and installations.

Aldo Tambellini was also a member of the NO!art movement, becoming close friends with founding NO!artist Boris Lurie. No!art was a major intermedia movement, whose work dealt directly with World War II themes and the Holocaust, both of deep significance to Tambellini. Tambellini's work has been exhibited with other NO!artists throughout the East Coast.

== Post-millennial exhibitions and activities ==
In June 2010, Tambellini exhibited in a group show, Celluloid Cameraless Film at the Schirn Kunsthalle in Frankfurt Germany.

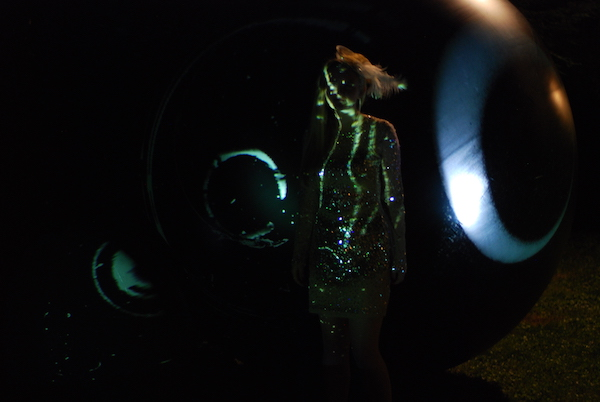
One of Aldo Tambellini's projected works, at an open air installation in 2014. Pictured with it is Holly Payne-Strange, who also appeared in Tambellini's "Circle in the Square" based on footage taken at this installation. Photo by Alex John Gilbey

November 2011 saw a Tambellini retrospective presented at the Chelsea Museum, New York – Black Zero (1966–1999). The retrospective included an evening performance of Black Zero and a continuous projection of Tambellini's early works. This exhibition was sponsored by the Boris Lurie Foundation.

In October 2012, Tambellini exhibited in the Tate Tanks at London's Tate Modern. The program included screenings of two of his performance pieces Black Zero and Moondial, screenings of his Black Film Series and other films from his 1960s Era. The installation Retracing Black now forms part of Tate Modern's permanent collection. In September 2013 Tambellini had his first gallery retrospective at the James Cohan Gallery, New York.

In 2015, Tambellini was invited to exhibit in the Italian Pavilion at the 2015 Venice Biennale. His work, displayed in the Arsenale Complex, included a new installation – a multi-screen projected work entitled Study of Internal Shapes and Outward Manifestations and a series of 2D illustrations entitled Memory Atlas. In September of the same year his installation work Atlantic in Brooklyn 1971–72, Morning, Noon and Night, was displayed in The Boiler in Brooklyn, New York. Consisting of video footage shot from his apartment window at the intersection of Atlantic and Flatbush Avenues, the work was digitally re-mastered and projected on six large screens. The fall of 2015 also saw Tambellini's video work The Circle in the Square projected at the Boston Convention and Exhibition Center as part of their Art on the Marquee Project. This work was filmed at an open air Tambellini installation in August 2014, and featured actress and model Holly Payne-Strange.

In 2016, the Aldo Tambellini Art Foundation was created. It is dedicated to the advancement of the works of Tambellini and the protection and promotion of contemporary art. Furthermore, the Foundation seeks to ensure that Tambellini's works are accessible to all via permanent placements and loans in galleries and museums throughout the world. The foundation seeks to support and encourage emerging artists of all disciplines that resonate with the philosophy of Tambellini. This mission includes the care, preservation and restoration of Tambellini's work.

In 2018, Aldo's work was featured in artist M. Woods' short film, An Infinite Loop for Resistance ft. Aldo Tambellini, which had its official premiere at the 2018 International Film Festival of Rotterdam. On August 15, 2019, Tambellini's work was curated by NY-based filmmaker and artist Alex Faoro, hosted by the Boston-based experimental film collective AgX. Tambellini's work was once again showcased alongside the work of his mentee, M. Woods.

== Media ==
Tambellini has over 1400 pieces of artwork and 1000 poems. He has worked in bronze. He worked with coal, acrylic and oil paints for his paintings. His earliest intermedia works involved the painting of cellulose slides and the use of projectors and televisions. His electromedia performances were collaborative efforts, utilizing jazz, poetry and dance along with painted slides. Tambellini was also a film editor and created visual poems.

Tambellini's films often deal with propaganda and perceptions. His major film "Black TV" took snaps and clips from television, where he edited scenes side by side. His films were often Black and White, surreal, and had a social context. In 2006 his short film "Listen" won for Best Experimental film at the Syracuse International Film Festival.

Tambellini often noted communication as an artistic medium. In 1968, in the Video History Project, he said:

"Television is a means of communication in the larger sense, which should enable us to relate instantaneously to each other. It is the case of an impermanent electronic beam capable of exchanging inter-global communications, a medium which should be explored for its speed of light, its instantaneous quality."

— Aldo Tambellini in an interview with Visual History Project

Tambellini was a pioneer in the video-art movement. His first videotape was broadcast by ABC TV News in New York in 1967.

Tambellini became Fellow at the Center for Advanced Visual Studies (CAVS) at the Massachusetts Institute of Technology in 1976. From 1976 to 1984, Tambellini conducted courses and workshops in communication and media, as well as participating in live experimental events in slow-scan in the United States, Europe, Japan and Australia. Most of his experiments revolved around slow scan. While at CAVS he participated in "Arts Electronica" in Vienna, Austria and lectured on Aesthetics and Technology at the Institute of Design in Offenbach am Main, Germany. In 1980, Tambellini founded Communicationsphere, a network of artists, performers, technicians, and engineers who were interested in the impact of telecommunications on the changing modern society.

== Major exhibitions ==
- 1968: National Television Broadcast by Artists at WDR, Cologne, Germany, "Black Gate Cologne." (with Otto Piene)
- 1968: First broadcast by artists, "Medium is the Medium," on WBGH, Boston
- 1968: "Some More Beginnings", Brooklyn Museum, New York. Exhibition of his video sculpture
- 1968: "Light as Art," also video sculpture, Howard Wise Gallery, NYC
- 1969: "TV as a Creative Medium" (first Video Art Gallery Show in America), Howard Wise Gallery, NYC, he exhibited his video sculpture, "Black Spiral," a modified television set realized with engineer Tracy Kinsel.
- 1970: "Vision & Television Show", Rose Art Museum, Brandeis University, Massachusetts (the first museum show of television as an art form in America). Tambellini exhibited his "videograms", prints made by printing the image directly from the video screen without the use of a camera.
- 1971: "Atlantic in Brooklyn", a one-man show at "The Kitchen", NYC
- 1971: "Cineprobe", Museum of Modern Art, NYC with a one-man film show
- 1971: "A Special Video Show," Whitney Museum, first video art show in New York in 1971
- 1977: "Photography and Video Work." Everson Museum of Art, Syracuse, NY, one man show
- 2003: 1st Howl Festival, mini-film retrospective. NYC
- 2011: "Black Zero" Chelsea Art Museum, NYC. A retrospective (1960–1990)
- 2012: "The Tate Tanks". Tate Modern London, England. A recreation of "Black Zero" and "Moondial
- 2013: Gallery Retrospective. James Cohan Gallery, New York, 12 September – 19 October
- 2015: Italian Pavilion Venice Biennale. 9 May – 22 November
- 2015: Atlantic in Brooklyn, Morning, Noon and Night. The Boiler, Brooklyn, 11 September – 18 October
- 2016: "Artist Run Galleries in New York City 1952 to 1965, Reinventing Downtown, When Artists Ran The Show" NYU Grey Gallery Jan 10 - April 1, 2017
- 2017: Aldo Tambellini. Black Matters, ZKM Center for Art and Media Karlsruhe, Germany
- 2017: Black Fragments, Video Screening, Fitchburg University, Fitchburg, MA
- 2017: Behind the Black Door, Featured Artist, (S8) Mostra del Cinema Periiferico. Caruna, Spain
- 2017: Film Screenings and Performance, Experimental Response Cinema and Austin Film Society, Austin, Texas
- 2018: Aldo Tambellini Room opens at The Tate Modern London - July 2018
- 2018: Art, Activism, and Anarchy, Exhibition and Panel Discussion. Narrative / Counter-narrative: (Re)defining the Sixties at NYU: Bobst Library, NYU, New York, NY.
- 2018: Flashes of the Future-The Art of the 68ers or Power to the Powerless. Ludwig Forum fur Internationale Kunst, Aasche, Germany
- 2018: Art of The Television - Emerson Urban Art Gallery, Boston, MA
- 2019: No! Art - Janco Dada Museum, Ein Hod, Israel
- 2019: Black TV Revisited - WGBH Boston.
- 2019: Respire - Leneas Theatre Group, NYC and Boston MA
- 2019: Dumplands - Multiple showings
- 2019: The Black TV Project 1969–2019, ACUD Studio, Berlin Art Week
- 2020: In the beginning all was black. Curated by Jane de Almeida. Casanova Arte. São Paulo, Brazil
- 2023: Filmes Black: Aldo Tambellini. Curated by Jane de Almeida at the São Paulo Museum of Modern Art
- 2024: (Posthumously) Black Infinitude: A Retrospective of the work of Aldo Tambellini. Curated by M. Woods for the Aldo Tambellini Art Foundation. In partnership with Anna Salamone, the Ann Arbor Film Festival, and Harvard Film Archive. Screenings: Ann Arbor Film Festival, Prismatic Ground, and Peripheries Experimental Film & Video Festival.

== Poetry ==
- 2017 - LISTEN - Selected poems of Aldo Tambellini 1946 to 2016 was published.

== Personal life ==
His long-time partner and fellow artist Sarah Dickenson died in the 1990s. He lived in New York’s Lower East Side and later Brooklyn until he moved to Cambridge, Massachusetts in 1986 to take up a fellowship at The Center for Advanced Visual Arts at Massachusetts Institute of Technology. He met Anna Salamone who became his collaborator and partner until his death.
