= Milford Mill Academy =

Coordinates: 39.35639°N 76.75000°W

Location
- 3800 Washington Avenue, Phone: 410-887-0660; Baltimore, Maryland; United States

Information
- Type: Public secondary
- Motto: "Learning is Our Foundation"
- Established: 1949
- School district: Baltimore County Public Schools
- Faculty: 117
- Grades: 9-12
- Gender: Boys and Girls (Co-ed)
- Campus: 42.73 acres (172,900 m^{2})
- Colors: Green and White
- Mascot: Millers
- Nickname: The Millers
- Website: milfordmillhs.bcps.org

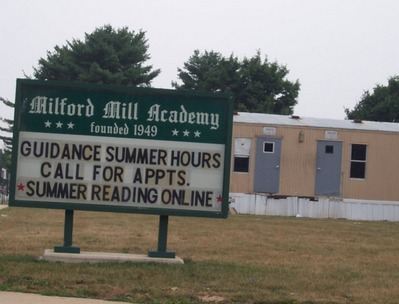
Milford Mill Academy

Milford Mill Academy (MMA) is a four-year public high school in Baltimore County, Maryland, United States. It is located on the west side of the county close to the Baltimore border just outside the Baltimore Beltway.

== About the school ==
Milford Mill Academy is located on 3800 Washington Avenue in Milford Mill, Maryland. The school was named after the area, which was called Milford where a local mill was a large part of the economy. In 1992, after several years of modernization, students returned to the school after being housed at a temporary facility. The school then renamed itself Milford Mill Academy, after being named Milford Mill High School for many years. The school borders three other high schools in Baltimore County that were built due to overcrowding at Milford Mill- Pikesville High School, Woodlawn High School, and Randallstown High School.

The school originally was a junior/senior high school. The area of the county when Milford opened its doors in 1949 was mostly rural. In the early and mid 1950s, the school became overcrowded, forcing the county to build a separate junior high (Sudbrook; grades 7-9)and the renamed high school dropped the "Junior" from its name.

== Academics ==
Milford Mill Academy received a 44.2 out of a possible 90 points (49%) on the 2018-2019 Maryland State Department of Education Report Card and received a 3 out of 5 star rating, ranking in the 27th percentile among all Maryland schools.

== Magnet Programs ==
Milford Mill offers 7 different magnet programs for students interested in subjects of their talent.

Magnet Programs

Fine & Performing Arts Magnet Programs

- Vocal Music
- Design and Production
- Dance
- Visual Arts

Career and Technical Education (CTE) Magnet Programs

- Automotive Service Technology
- Building and Construction Technology
- Cosmetology

== Students ==
The 2019–2020 enrollment at Milford Mill High School was 1251 students.

== Athletics ==
=== State championships ===
Football

- Class C 1987
- Class 2A 2022

Volleyball

- Class A 1978

Girls Basketball

- 3A 2005, 2014, 2015
- Mildred Haney Murray Sportsmanship Award 1998

Boys Basketball

- Class C 1988
- 1A 1992, 1994
- 3A 2010, 2011, 2013

Girls Indoor Track

- Class B-C 1984, 1985
- 3A-2A 2002, 2003

Boys Indoor Track

- Class A 1981 TIE
- Class B-C 1982, 1983, 1987
- 3A-2A 1997
- 3A 2015

Baseball

- Class B 1984

Girls Track and Field

- Class C 1988 TIE
- 1A 1991
- 3A 2015

Boys Track and Field

- Class C 1988
- 1A 1989, 1992

== Notable alumni ==
- Howard Ashman Class of 1967 - 2 time Oscar-winning songwriter Howard (film)
- Corey Blechman Class of 1967 – Co-screenwriter of the movie Free Willy
- Victor Blackwell - class of 1999 - television personality
- Damon Ferguson Jr. – class of 2026 – college football running back for the Pittsburgh Panthers
- Ira Glass - public radio personality
- Brian Jordan - professional baseball and football player voted as an alternate to the National Football Conference Pro Bowl team during the 1991 season, MLB All Star in 1999. The only other all stars in MLB and gridiron football were Deion Sanders and Bo Jackson.
- Marlon Jones - class of 1982 - former NFL professional, DT, Cleveland Browns (1987-1989)
- Maysa Leak- jazz musician, producer, educator
- Isaiah Miles (born 1994) - basketball player in the Israeli Basketball Premier League
- Mo'Nique - class of 1985 – Oscar winning actress/comedy
- Ricky Porter - class of 1978 - former NFL professional, RB, Detroit Lions, 1982, Baltimore Colts, 1983, Buffalo Bills, 1987.
- Deshawn Purdie – class of 2024 – college football quarterback for the Liberty Flames
- Reggie E. White- class of 1988 - NFL professional DT, San Diego Chargers, (1992-1994) and present Milford Head Football Coach
- Mario (singer) Class of 2004 (Grammy Nominated Singer, Songwriter, Actor, Billboard Music Award Winner)
- Errol Webber Class of 2004 (Oscar Winning, Sundance Winning, Cinematographer, Film Producer, Documentary Producer and Politician)
- Michele S. Jones - the first woman in the United States Army Reserve to reach the position of command sergeant major of the U.S. Army Reserve.
- Kamaria Muntu - Black Feminist poet, writer and arts activist. She is also Editor and Founder of Femficatio Literary Magazine.

== References and notes ==
- See also List of Schools in Baltimore County, Maryland
