= Thietmar =

Thietmar may refer to:

- Thietmar, Count of Merseburg (died 932)
- Thietmar, Margrave of Meissen (died 979)
- Thietmar of Prague (died 982), bishop
- Thietmar of Merseburg (975–1018), bishop and chronicler
- Thietmar, Margrave of the Saxon Ostmark (died 1030)
- Thietmar of Hildesheim, bishop from 1038 to 1044
- Thietmar of Minden, bishop (died 1206)
- Thietmar (pilgrim), visited the Holy Land in 1217–1218

== See also ==
- Dietmar (disambiguation)
