= Jane de Almeida =

Brazilian academic

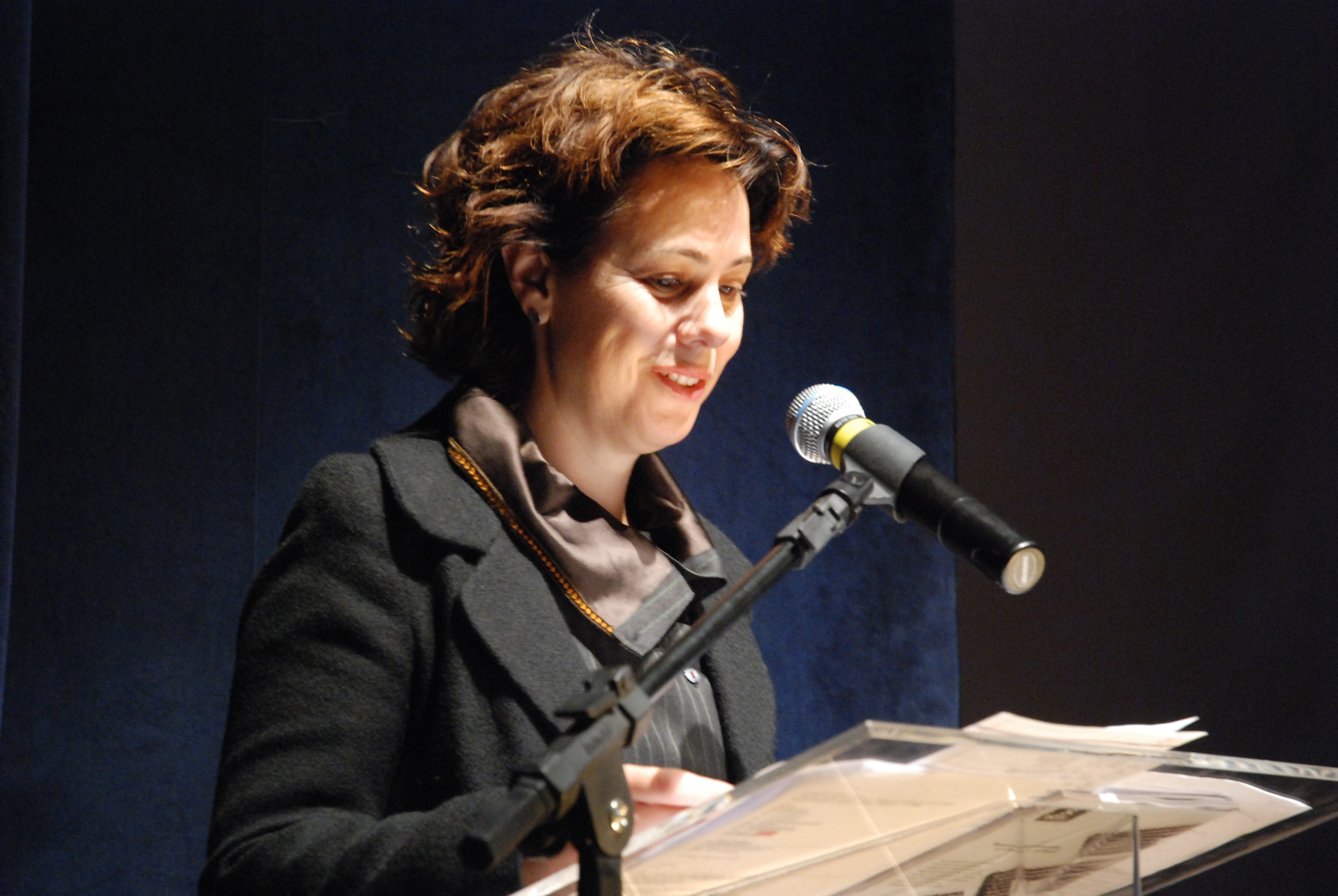
- Born: Para de Minas, Minas Gerais, Brazil
- Occupations: Researcher; professor; director; curator; theoretician
- Employer(s): Harvard University, University of California San Diego, Pontifical Catholic University of São Paulo, State University of Campinas
- Known for: Art film; contemporary art; film; cinema; new media
- Awards: Hubert Bals Fund (1994)
- Website: www.janedealmeida.com

Jane de Almeida is a Brazilian art historian, scholar, filmmaker and curator.

== Biography ==
Born in Pará de Minas, state of Minas Gerais, Brazil, de Almeida graduated in psychology from Pontifical Catholic University of Minas Gerais and studied cinematography in Belo Horizonte. Currently she is based in São Paulo, Brazil and in Lisbon, Portugal.

de Almeida works belong in the following categories: experimental film, video art, contemporary art and computer art.

de Almeida started her artistic career in the beginning of the 1990s from psychoanalysis, semiotic, contemporary art and cinema theoretical analysis (Lacan, Freud, Charles Sanders Peirce). She developed an audiovisual language, which led her from experimental films to cinematic experiences. In her works, she explored not only the "media" language and technologies, but also film, video, television, and interactive electronic environments. Critically she analyzed their function for the construction of meaning in the objects represented in the contemporary art field. Besides taking part in art and cinema exhibitions, she developed "expanded cinema" experiments inspired by digital media theories that reflect the ideological and technological conditions of cinematic representation.

de Almeida directed the short films 2014k (4k 3D, 2010, 10 mins), StereoEssays: Five or Six Essays in Search of a Narrative (4k 3D, 2011, 16 min), StereoEssays São Paulo (4k 3D, 2018, 15 mins), Openmouthed (4k, 2014, 3 mins), The Diving (4k, 2014, 2 mins) and Pixel Race (4k, 2015, 9 mins). She was co-scriptwriter for the films 500 Souls (2004) and Invenção de Limite (awarded with the Hubert Bals Fund) and directed the film-essay Loga - Mars Projections (2020, 45 mins).

de Almeida followed her artistic career using a large variety of materials, forms and techniques: installation, film, video and new media objects, investigating the intersection among media, subjectivity and perception.

== Research and teaching ==
de Almeida has held numerous academic positions including lecturer in the Visual Arts Department at University of California, San Diego, Visiting Fellow in the Department of History of Art and Architecture at Harvard University (2005), visiting scholar in the Department of Philosophy at Boston College (1999) and lecturer at the São Paulo Museum of Art. Currently she is a Professor at the Art Department at Pontifícia Universidade Católica de São Paulo, in São Paulo and an affiliated professor at the graduate studies in social sciences (Ph.D.) at the State University of Campinas, Campinas, Brazil. She was an artist in residence at the Arthur C. Clarke Center for Human Imagination, visiting researcher at NOVA University Lisbon (2019) and University of Porto (2001), guest researcher at Medialab-Prado (2006) and visiting scholar in the Department of Communication at University of California, San Diego (2007/2008/2018). de Almeida published articles and book chapters such as “On Elephants, Telescopes, Microscopes, Cartography, Aliens, and Computers: Notes on Scalability in Alexander Kluge's Works” In: Stichwort: Kooperation. Keiner ist alleine schlau genug (Alexander Kluge-Jahrbuch, Verlag, 2017), “The dot and the line” for A companion to Contemporary Drawing (Wiley, 2020) and organized the books CineGrid: cinematic futures (Cinusp, 2017) and Harun Farocki: Programming the Visible (bilingual, Cinusp, 2018) with articles by Thomas Elsaesser, Erika Balsom, Alfredo Suppia, Harun Farocki, Patricia Moran among others. de Almeida holds an MfA and a PhD in Communication and Semiotics.

== Curatorial activities ==
de Almeida curated art exhibitions and film festivals for art spaces, galleries and museums such as Off the Radar at University of California, San Diego Visual Arts Gallery, Harun Farocki: Programming the Visible at Paço das Artes, In the Beginning all was Black about Aldo Tambellini's work, FeFiCi Festival (Festival de Filmes Científicos), Ulla, Ulla, Martians! at Casanova Gallery, FILE Transcontinental, FILE 2008000000 pixels, FILE QUBIT AI exhibitions at Federação das Indústrias do Estado de São Paulo Gallery, the Dziga Vertov Group, Alexander Kluge: the fifth act, Metacinemas, Aisthesis and Ordering and Vertigo: Arthur Bispo do Rosario at Centro Cultural Banco do Brasil, accompanied with catalogs or comprehensive books.

== Selected bibliography ==
- Passages on Brazilian scientific cinema. Public Understanding of Science, 26(5), 579–595.
- Festivais buscam divulgar conteúdo científico por meio do audiovisual. Revista FAPESP. Letícia Naísa, ed. 335, jan. 2024.
- Cinema científico no Brasil: três tempos. In Cinemas em Redes: Tecnologia, Estética e Política na Era Digital. Org. Gilberto Alexandre Sobrinho. Campinas: Papirus, 2020.
- Apontamentos sobre o Cinema Científico: Arlindo Machado. Significação: Revista De Cultura Audiovisual, 49(57), 41-60.
- The dot and the line. Drawing amongst computers. In: A Companion to Contemporary Drawing. London, Wiley, 2020.
- Harun Farocki: programming the visible. São Paulo, CINUSP, 2018.
- On Elephants, Telescopes, Microscopes, Cartography, Aliens, and Computers: Notes on Scalability in Alexander Kluge's Works. In: Stichwort: Kooperation. Keiner ist alleine schlau genug (Alexander Kluge-Jahrbuch, Verlag, 2017).
- CineGrid: cinematic futures. São Paulo, CINUSP, 2017.
- Interview with Yve-Alain Bois
- Interview with Jean-Pierre Gorin
- Alexander Kluge: o quinto ato. São Paulo, CosacNaify, 2007.
- Dziga Vertov Group. São Paulo, witz edições, 2005.

== Films ==
- Loga - Mars Projections
- StereoEssays Rio de Janeiro
- StereoEssays São Paulo
- Openmouthed (4k, 2014, 3 mins)
- The Diving (4k, 2014, 2 mins)
- Pixel Race (4k, 2015, 9 mins)
- 500 Souls (scriptwriter)

== Decorations and awards ==
- 1994: Hubert Bals Fund
