= Koukolná =

Coordinates: 49°53′15″N 18°29′23″E

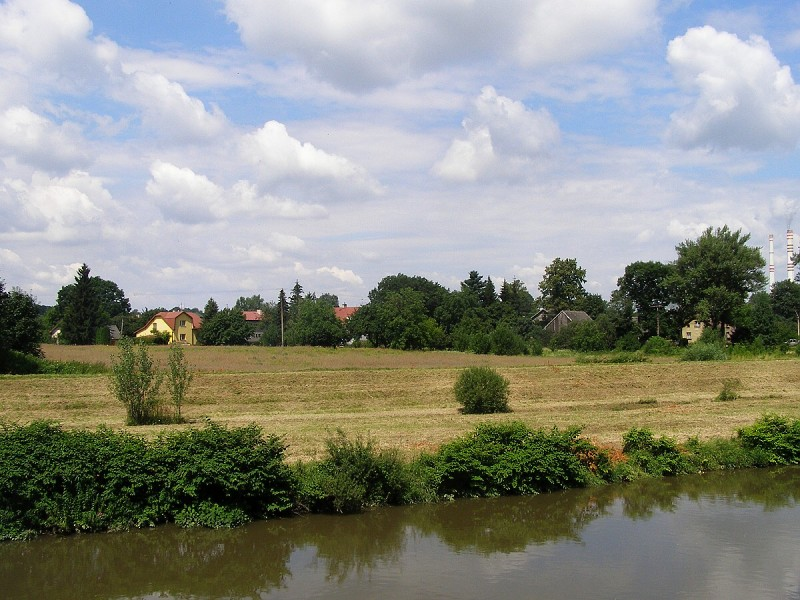
A village by the river Olza

Koukolná (Polish: Kąkolna, German: Konkolna) is a village in Karviná District, Moravian-Silesian Region, Czech Republic. It was first mentioned in 1447 and was a separate municipality, but became administratively a part of Dětmarovice in years 1872–1875. It has an area of 1,78 km^{2}, and in 2001 it had a population of 243.
