= Kamaria Muntu =

American poet

- Website: www.femficatio.com

Kamaria S. Muntu (born Tracey De Sandra Martin on November 1) is a Black Feminist poet, writer and arts activist. She is also Editor and Founder of Femficatio Literary Magazine.

== Childhood and personal life ==
She was born in Baltimore, Maryland the daughter of an elementary school teacher, who later became a Master Teacher, and a bus driver who was among the first Black men to integrate the Baltimore Transit Company. She is the granddaughter of Elizabeth Mae Kennedy. When she was a month old, her parents divorced and she and her mother lived with her grandparents. Her mother later remarried and she had a turbulent upbringing. While attending Milford Mill Senior High school now Milford Mill Academy in Baltimore she played Mrs. Chumley in a production of Harvey, the wife to Dr. Chumley played by the now celebrity Ira Glass, of "This American Life". Muntu was a theater major at university.

Muntu is best known for being a contributor to the anthology Call and Response: The Riverside Anthology of the African American Literary Tradition. She is General Editor of Sinister Guru (formerly Femficatio) the cultural and literary magazine of Coal and Femficatio Publishing.

== Poetry ==
Muntu is primarily a poet, with few publications in other genres. She was first published in Call and Response: The Riverside Anthology for the African American Literary Tradition for which her work was highly critically praised, the editors hailing Muntu as a "rising star in neo-aesthetic literary circles". Poems included were "Lymphoma" and "Of Women and Spirit". Muntu has been heavily anthologized, appearing in literary journals and anthologies in the USA and the UK.

Muntu has read her poetry at the National Black Arts Festival in Atlanta with such notables as Sonia Sanchez and Mari Evans.

Kamaria Muntu's work has also been featured in Fertile Ground - Memories & Visions: "A Call to End the Oppression of Women" (1996) with the Atlanta Committee for Black Liberation; the anthology A Lime Jewel (2010); Journal of Pan African Studies (2010); the poetry collection This Peace of Place (2012); and the anthology Stand Our Ground: Poems for Trayvon Martin and Marissa Alexander (2014).

== Sinister Guru ==
Muntu is General Editor of Sinister Guru (formerly Femficatio Culture), the online culture and literary magazine of Coal and Femficatio Publishing. According to the website of the journal, the term Femficatio was coined by Philosophy Editor Malkia Charlee NoCry. Femficatio/Sinister Guru has Published the art of Aldo Tambellini, Helene Ruiz and Sam Grisham; has interviewed the artist and actor Michael Marisi Ornstein; has published award winning poets Askia M. Toure and Afaa M. Weaver, as well as the writing of Pamela Plummer, Margie Shaheed, Pavel Rogov, Nana Nyarko Boateng and CC Ashagra; and musician Lilli Lewis, among others.

== Activism ==
Muntu has worked with organisations such as Amnesty International. She has spearheaded many initiatives for at-risk youth and women in the arts throughout Georgia, USA. From her experience as an activist,

Noted for her dedication to women's equality, she was one of the principal writers (among them Ajamu Baraka, who won the United Nations Ambassador Kofi Annan award as a death penalty activist) of a paper entitled "A Call to End the Oppression of Women" published in Fertile Ground by Kalamu Ya Salaam and Keshia Brown (Renagade Press).

In 2018, Kamaria Muntu's chapter, "Understanding the macroaggressions underscoring the invisibility of Black female victims of police violence within Black Lives Matter protests" was published in the book "Intersectionality in Social Work: Activism and Practice in Context" edited by Suryia Nayak and Rachel Robbins.

== Publications ==
- Fertile Ground - Memories & Visions: "A Call to End the Oppression of Women" (1996) with the Atlanta Committee for Black Liberation
- Call and Response: The Riverside Anthology for the African American Literary Tradition (1997)
- Review of "Mother Earth Responds", Journal of Pan African Studies
- Intersectionality in Social Work: Activism and Practice in Context (2018)
