= Rocco Armento =

American artist and member of the NO!art movement (b. 1924, df. 2011)

Rocco Armento (October 25, 1924 – December 30, 2011) was an American sculptor, painter, and member of the NO!art movement. His postwar abstractions were influenced by Picasso, Giacometti, and Marini. He lived in Woodstock, NY in his self-built home with a geodesic dome studio.

== Early life, military service, and education ==
Armento was born and raised in Staten Island, NY. His parents were first-generation Italian-American immigrants. He first began sculpting at eight years of age, following the family tradition. He continued working throughout his life.

In March 1943, Armento joined the U.S. Army as a Radio Repairman, serving in the 155th Photo Reconnaissance Squadron in the European Theater, his service beginning in Normandy. He earned multiple decorations and citations including six service stars and a European–African–Middle Eastern Campaign Medal. He was honorably discharged in October 1945 after the end of the war.

He lived and studied in Paris on the GI Bill from 1950 to 1953, at the Académie de la Grande Chaumière, then returned to the United States. He also trained at the Arts Student League in New York City, the Mechanics Institute, the National Academy of Design, and the Wagner College in New York. Expanding beyond sculpture, he studied Science at Wagner College and architecture at the Mechanics Institute.

From 1961 to 1965 Armento taught painting, drawing, and sculpture at the School of Visual Arts in New York. He lived and worked in a geodesic studio located upstate in Woodstock, NY.

== Career ==
Much of Armento's work focused on the human form and texture, and he was wary of his work becoming overly academic. Arts Magazine drew attention to this focus on texture; "A tender and vulnerable quality bespeaks deeper emotions than are immediately apparent in the plaster figures and torsos of Rocco Armento." ARTnews recorded "Armento's sculpture roughly scrambled together figures seem to have been made so effortlessly as to be almost casual. They sit and stand just right, portly and with bumpy limbs in balanced poses, and are as homely and familiar as people in the subway."

From 1956 to 1965, Armento showcased his art at galleries and shows. These included the 10th Street galleries, such as the March Gallery (of which he was an original member), the Brata Gallery, and the Tanger Gallery. He also showcased his work at the Gallery Gertrude Stein and the Block Museum of Art in Chicago. In the 1960s, Armento performed sculpture work in Paris with Al Held.

In 2001, his artworks were featured in the NO!art and the Aesthetics of Doom exhibition.

Armento was skilled in a wide variety of sculptural techniques. These included casting in sand; the Shaw process; lost wax processing; latex, Roman, and piece molds, and model creation for industrial casting.

== Legacy ==
Select pieces of Armento's work are part of the permanent NO!Art collection. Photographs of his sculpture have been preserved by the Smithsonian and his contributions to American Art recorded in the Thomas Hess Papers. Many of his paintings and sculptures have been preserved and cataloged by his estate, providing more examples of his artistic style.

Armento died in 2011 of congestive heart failure. He has two sons, Ben and Dante Armento.
