= Dietmar Wittmann =

Dietmar H. Wittmann (born June 16, 1940) is a German academic surgeon specializing in complex abdominal surgery. He was associated with the following medical schools: University of Hamburg, Germany, University of Düsseldorf, Germany, University of California San Francisco Medical School, USA, Hahnemann Medical School, Philadelphia, USA, Medical College of Wisconsin Milwaukee, USA . In addition to his clinical work, research, publications and teaching and lecturing worldwide, he is mostly known for his work relating to intra-abdominal infections, abdominal compartment syndrome abdominal compartment syndrome and staged abdominal repair STAR. Besides introducing the concept of calculated antimicrobial therapy Wittmann conceptualized the operative strategy of Staged Abdominal Repair (STAR) or the planned open abdomen to reverse the detrimental effects of the abdominal compartment syndrome and to treat imminent intra abdominal complications before they progress to life-threatening conditions. He is the inventor of a fascia prosthesis for temporary abdominal closure, the Artificial Bur Fascia Prosthesis (generic) or Wittmann Patch and Star Patch (trade names).

== Biography ==
Wittmann was born on June 16, 1940, in Duisburg, Germany, and educated in France and Germany before starting medical school in Hamburg, Germany. He studied medicine at the medical schools of Hamburg, Düsseldorf, and the University of California San Francisco Medical School. He graduated summa cum laude from the University of Hamburg. Two years later Wittmann defended a Ph.D. thesis in neurophysiology and toxicology at the University of Düsseldorf on the affinity of carbon monoxide to hemoglobin of various laboratory animals and men.

Following medical school he continued his surgical training in Hamburg, Philadelphia, Annaba, Algeria, (Mission Chirurgicale de la République Fédérale d' Allemagne) to become Board certified General Surgeon and after an additional two years, a Board certified Unfallchirurg (surgeon for soft tissue, visceral and orthopedic trauma).In 1988, after organizing an International Congress in Hamburg, Germany, with the sole topic of intra-abdominal infection and founding the Surgical Infection Society - Europe, he accepted a position as professor of surgery at the Medical College of Wisconsin.

=== Professional work ===
He worked first at the Altona General Hospital of the University of Hamburg Medical School. His early research was focused on peptic ulcer disease, and highly selective vagotomy and he developed a method to measure gastrin levels in antral vein blood long before sophisticated analysis methods to measure pg levels were established.

Concerning antimicrobial therapy of surgical infection, he started measuring antibiotic concentrations in tissue fluid representative for the site of infection by analyzing body fluids and bone chips and that would have been disposed of in the course of surgical procedures. Antibiotic concentrations measured in tissues were then compared to concentrations required to kill bacteria to serve as the foundation of anti-infective therapies. Based on these studies Wittmann habilitated for professor of surgery at the University of Hamburg defending his thesis about the concentration dynamics of antimicrobials intra-abdominal infections. In 1972 Wittmann had the opportunity to work in Annaba, Algeria, and took his young family to Algeria for an anticipated two-year commitment. After a year political unrest forced the Wittmanns to return to Germany but by then he had seen many diseases in their advanced stages including abdominal infections. The culmination of experiences led Wittmann to begin to develop a means to keep the abdominal wall safely open for serial intra-operative treatment and control of healing processes. Early attempts used a variety of temporary closure devices such as retention sutures, zippers, and slide fasteners. Ultimately he discovered the method of hook and loop fasteners to be optimal for closing the abdomen temporarily. In 1988 he joined the faculty of Robert E. Condon and Charles Aprahamian at the Medical College of Wisconsin and became a full professor of surgery. He developed one of the first US surgical critical care fellowship programs at the Medical College of Wisconsin in 1990 and became its first director. In 2000 Wittmann retired from the medical college but continued his work on the staged abdominal repair and the hook and loop fastener temporary fascia prosthesis. He remained active providing advice to surgeons worldwide using his website www.openabdomen.org and continued to lecture about the fundamental benefits of the planned open abdomen.

=== Inventions ===
- 1976: Measurement of pre-hepatic gastrin concentrations by antral vein puncture.
- 1977: First-time investigation of antibiotic concentrations in body fluids of patients as a basis to guide antimicrobial therapy and monitor penetration of antibiotics to the site of infection.
- 1979: Invention of the "Kuh von Altona, a suctioning device to collect otherwise not used body fluids from patients for pharmacokinetic investigations and to collect pro-inflammatory and inflammatory mediators and proteins.
- 1980: Pharmacodynamics: Antimicrobial concentrations at the site of infection as the foundation of therapy.
- 1981: First-time differentiation of various bone compartments to identify the bone compartment that is relevant for infection and where antibiotics should concentrate.
- 1982: First-time investigation of the relevance of protein binding in humans by synchronous application and measurements of two penicillins with the same half-life but different degrees of protein binding. Measurements were performed in serum and in peritoneal fluid.
- 1983: First-time investigation to measure inflammatory proteins in peritoneal fluid.
- 1983: Peritonitis Index Altona PIA-I (Scoring system for intra-abdominal infections).
- 1987: Peritonitis Index Altona PIA-II (Scoring system for intra-abdominal infections).
- 1983: Calculated Antimicrobial Therapy for mixed Surgical Infections.
- 1987: Foundation of the Surgical Infection Society - Europe.
- 1987: The Artificial Bur Fascia Prosthesis, a temporary abdominal closure device that facilitates planned relaparotomies or Staged Abdominal Repairs (STAR or Stage Injury Repair (STIR).
- 1991: STAR (Staged Abdominal Repair), a new operative approach for intra-abdominal infections utilizing the hook and loop fastener fascia prosthesis.
- 1993: STIR (Staged Injury Repair), a new operative approach for severe trauma utilizing the hook and loop fastener fascia prosthesis.
- 1994: Quality of life after trauma as an outcome criterion to measure the quality of trauma care.
- 1995: Discovery of Fox Den Disease as a separate surgical infection.
- 1995: Dynamic Antibiotic Switching Therapy (DAST), a new form of antibiotic treatment: changing the antibiotic regimen every 24 hours to avoid selection of resistant bacterial strains.

== Patents ==
212 A burr-like device to facilitate temporary abdominal closure in planned multiple laparotomies. by Dietmar H. Wittmann, Charles Aprahamian, Jack M. Bergstein, Charles E. Edmiston. Eur J Surg 159: 75-79, 1993

414 Staged abdominal repair: Development and current practice of an advanced operative technique for diffuse suppurative peritonitis by Dietmar H. Wittmann. European Surgery 32(4):171-178 (DOI: 10.1007/BF02949258)

Patent No.7,658,749 Method Wittmann Hypopack 2010-02-09

Patent No.7,662,169 Methd Temp Fascia Prosthesis (Wittmann Patch)2010-02-16

Patent No.8,128,655 Apparatus Wittmann-Hypopack-2012-03-06

Patent No.8,469,996 Apparatus Temp Fascia Prosthesis-(Wittmann Patch)2013-06-25
