= Ischemic bowel =

Ischemic bowel may refer to:

- Ischemic colitis, ischemia of the large bowel
- Mesenteric ischemia, ischemia of the small bowel
