= Tim Wuttke =

German footballer

Personal information
- Date of birth: August 15, 1987 (age 39)
- Place of birth: Jena, East Germany
- Height: 1.82 m (6 ft 0 in)
- Position: Defender

Youth career
- 1994–2007: FC Carl Zeiss Jena

Senior career*
| Years | Team | Apps | (Gls) |
| 2007–2012 | FC Carl Zeiss Jena II | 48 | (7) |
| 2008–2012 | FC Carl Zeiss Jena | 56 | (0) |
| 2014–2017 | IMO Merseburg | 24 | (3) |
| Total | | 128 | (10) |
- * Club domestic league appearances and goals

Tim Wuttke (born 15 August 1987 in Jena) is a German retired football defender who played in the 3. Liga for Carl Zeiss Jena.
