= Boris Lurie =

American artist and writer (1924–2008)

- Born: July 18, 1924; Leningrad, Soviet Union
- Died: January 7, 2008 (aged 83); New York City, US
- Resting place: Haifa, Israel
- Occupation: Artist

Boris Lurie (July 18, 1924 – January 7, 2008) was an American artist and writer. He co-founded the NO!Art movement which calls for socially and politically involved art that would resist and combat the forces of the market. His controversial work, often related to the Holocaust, has frequently irritated critics and curators.

Though he lived as a penniless artist, Lurie amassed $80 million by buying penny stocks and real estate which was used on August 8, 2009, to create the Boris Lurie Art Foundation.

== Early life ==
Lurie was born in Leningrad into a Jewish family and grew up in Riga. From 1941 to 1945 he was imprisoned in the Riga Ghetto, then the Lenta Arbeitslager, and then three separate concentration camps, including Salaspils, Stutthof, and the Buchenwald satellite camp at the Magdeburg Polte-Werke; his mother, grandmother and sister were murdered by the Nazis in the Rumbula massacre.

In 1946 he immigrated to New York and began his career as an artist. For a short time he attended the Art Students' League, where he studied with George Grosz and produced figurative work inspired by his wartime memories and of his life in New York, especially the dance halls around 14th Street. One of his best-known and most controversial works is "Railroad Collage" (1959), a collage juxtaposing a pin-up model undressing over the top of a wagon piled high with bodies of former prisoners in the newly liberated Buchenwald concentration camp. Over the course of his life, he produced thousands of drawings, etchings, paintings, collages, assemblages, and objects, often with pornographic or Holocaust-related imagery, as well as the novel House of Anita (released in a 2016 edition with texts and commentary by Terence Sellers), a large memoir entitled "In Riga" (published in 2019), and scores of poetry, collected in the volume Geschriebigtes - Gedichtigtes: NO!art in Buchenwald (2003)

== NO!art Movement ==
The art market is nothing but a racket.
—Boris Lurie

In 1960, with Sam Goodman and Stanley Fisher, Lurie took over leadership of the March Gallery (95 East 10th Street, New York, NY) from Elaine de Kooning. Their art was made out of a sense of disillusionment with the contemporary art scene, especially the emergence of pop. The goal was to have art address disconcerting truths: racism, imperialism, anti-semitism, nuclear holocaust, sexism, the art market, vulgarity, and depravity. Because of the content of Lurie's work, which often features the word "NO," and the 1963 NO Show at the Gallery: Gertrude Stein (24 East 81 Street, New York, NY), the group would become known as the NO!art movement. The movement favors "totally unabashed self-expression leading to social action" and is opposed to the worldwide capitalist "investment art market", to pop-art that celebrates consumerism and to decorative "salon art" such as abstract expressionism. Lurie's art and the NO!Art movement were largely ignored by the establishment, by part for Boris Lurie abominated established artists like Andy Warhol, and in 1970 Lurie wrote his critique "MOMA as Manipulator." One of the movement's earliest champions was the Italian art dealer, Arturo Schwarz.

Pieces by Lurie are now contained in the permanent collections of the National Gallery of Art (Washington, D.C.) and the Museum of Modern Art (MOMA; NYC). In 2001, the NO!Art movement was subject of a retrospective at the University of Chicago, the University of Nebraska–Lincoln and at the Whitney Museum of American Art (NYC).

In 2002, Amikam Goldman completed a documentary on Boris Lurie entitled No!Art Man, which was premiered at the Anthology Film Archives with Mr. Lurie present.

Lurie's art has found more resonance in Germany than in the United States. Germany saw two large exhibitions of his work in 1995 and 2004. A documentary, Shoah and Pin-Ups: The NO!-Artist Boris Lurie, was shown on German TV in 2007.

On January 7, 2008, Lurie died from kidney failure, days after having suffered a stroke. At age 83, he was the last surviving founder of the NO!Art movement. He is buried in Hof Hacarmel cemetery in Haifa, Israel.

Since 1999, the NO!Art Movement has been led by Dietmar Kirves in its Berlin headquarters, and Clayton Patterson in its New York headquarters. After the loss of Dietmar Kirves, the headquarters Berlin is represented by LST (Lars Schubert) in Sitges, Spain.

== Sources ==
- Boris Lurie: Uneasy visions, uncomfortable truths. The Villager, Volume 74, Number 42. 23 February 2005
- The artist as provocateur, Jewish Quarterly, Autumn 2005, Number 199. Includes an interview.
- "Die Nackten und die Toten". Der Spiegel. June 8, 2007. (in German)
- Obituary
- NY Times Obituary
