= Dietmar Rosenthal =

Russian linguist

Dietmar Elyashevich Rosenthal (Russian: Дитмар Эльяшевич Розенталь; 24 February 1900 – 29 July 1994) was a Russian linguist.

== Biography ==
He was born on 24 February 1900 in Łódź, Congress Poland. Rosenthal created several Russian-Italian dictionaries and also translated the works of Italian writers into Russian. Together with Konstantin Bylinsky he introduced practical stylistics. He is most famous for the creation of multiple guidebooks and dictionaries of the Russian language. From 1962 to 1985 he taught at Moscow State University.

He died in Moscow.
