= Dittmar =

Dittmar is a German surname. Notable people with the surname include:

- Andy Dittmar (born 1974), athlete
- Chris Dittmar (born 1964), squash player
- G. Walter Dittmar (1872–1949), dentist
- Gudrun Klaus-Dittmar, sprint canoer
- Hans Dittmar (1902–1967), sailor
- Heini Dittmar (1912–1960), glider pilot
- Kurt Dittmar (1891–1959), general
- Louise Dittmar (1807–1884), German feminist and philosopher
- Sabine Dittmar (born 1964), German politician
- Trudy Dittmar (born 1944), author
- Wally Dittmar (died 1983), football player
- William Dittmar (1833–1892), scientist

== See also ==
- Ditmar (disambiguation)
