= Lil Picard =

Counterculture era artist and activist

- Lilli Elizabeth Benedict
- Picard while filming "Lil Picard" by Silvianna Goldsmith, 1978
- Born: October 4, 1899; Landau, Germany
- Died: May 10, 1994 (aged 94); New York City, U.S.
- Movement: Countercultural art, Avant-garde art

Lil Picard, born Lilli Elisabeth Benedick (October 4, 1899 – May 10, 1994), was a cabaret actress, artist, journalist and critic, born in Landau, Germany, who took part in several generations of counterculture and avant-garde art in Berlin and in New York City.

== Biography ==
=== Early life ===
Lil Picard was born Lilli Elisabeth Benedick October 4, 1899 in Landau, Germany. She was the only child of Jakob, a wine producer and merchant, and Rosalie Benedick. She spent her childhood and adolescence in Strasbourg, Germany, which is now in France. Seeking solace from her parents, Lil found meaning in books. Westermanns Monatshefte introduced her to art and inspired her to draw at an early age.

=== Marriages and Life in Berlin ===
Upon completing school, Lil studied literature and art in Berlin. In 1918, at the age of 19, Lil met Fritz Picard, an antiquarian bookseller and intellectual with whom she lived in Berlin against her parents' wishes. Surrounded by dynamic artists, writers, composers, and filmmakers who moved to Berlin after World War I, the couple married in 1921. Lil Picard became a cabaret performer, acting in a small part in the film Variété. Picard also became involved in the Berlin Dadaist movement, associating herself with Dadaists George Grosz, Hugo Ball, and Richard Huelsenbeck and artists Bertolt Brecht, Otto Dix, and Hans Hoffman.

In 1926, she separated from Fritz Picard. Struggling with the skin condition shingles, her career in show business ended and Picard turned her attention to journalism. She wrote feuilleton for the Berliner Börsenkurier and worked as a fashion designer and model. In 1933, the year of Hitler's accession to power, she became fashion editor of Zeitschrift für Deutsche Konfektion, and a cultural reporter for the fashion and women's supplements of the Berliner Tageblatt, among other publications. She also worked as Art-correspondent for Kunstforum International and Die Welt.

In 1935, Picard married banker Hans Felix Jüdell. Due to the persecution of Jews and Hans' career pursuits, he changed his name to Henry Odell or O'Dell.

=== New York ===
In November 1936, Picard and her husband immigrated to New York City following the revocation of Picard's press credentials due to her Jewish heritage and growing antisemitic policies. In New York, Picard began to paint and exhibit works, and also worked as a journalist for over three decades, writing for Arts Magazine, East Village Other, and Interview.

In the 1960s, Picard produced painting, collage and assemblages, and was known as a frequenter of Andy Warhol's Factory. Her 1967 performance, "Construction-Destruction-Construction," at the Judson Church Gallery, was filmed by Andy Warhol. She also participated in feminist performance art with Carolee Schneemann and Yoko Ono. In 1976 she appeared in Rosa von Praunheim's New York film Underground and Emigrants.

In New York, Lil Picard dated Alfred Jensen and Ad Reinhardt.

== Exhibitions ==
- Solo Show. David Anderson Gallery. 1960. (first solo show)
- Protest-Action. With Wolf Vostell at the Italian Pavilion at the 34th Venice Biennale, 1968.
- Goethe House. 1976.
- Ronald Feldman Gallery. 1976.
- Holly Solomon Gallery. 1976.
- Neuer Berliner Kunstverein, Berlin. 1978.
- "Lil Picard and Counterculture New York." Grey Art Gallery, NYU. 2010 (premiere). University of Iowa Museum of Art. Spring, 2011.
