= Dietmar Wuttke =

German footballer

Personal information
- Date of birth: 2 August 1978 (age 48)
- Place of birth: Räckelwitz, Germany
- Position: Attacking midfielder

Team information
- Current team: TSG Reutlingen (Manager)

Youth career
- 1985–1997: Energie Cottbus

Senior career*
Years	Team	Apps	(Gls)
1997–2000	Energie Cottbus	14	(1)
2000–2002	Bayern Munich (A)	35	(4)
2002–2003	1. FC Schweinfurt 05	20	(0)
2003–2005	SSV Reutlingen	22	(5)
Total		91	(10)

Managerial career
- ????: TSV Oferdingen (playing manager)
- ????: SV Degerschlacht (playing assistant)
- 2011–2012: TSG Reutlingen (playing manager)
- 2012–: TSG Reutlingen
- * Club domestic league appearances and goals

Dietmar Wuttke (born 2 August 1978) is a German former footballer. Wuttke began his career with Energie Cottbus, where he made 14 appearances in the 2. Bundesliga. He later played for Bayern Munich II, FC Schweinfurt 05 and SSV Reutlingen before his career was cut short by injury.
