= Clayton Patterson =

Canadian artist

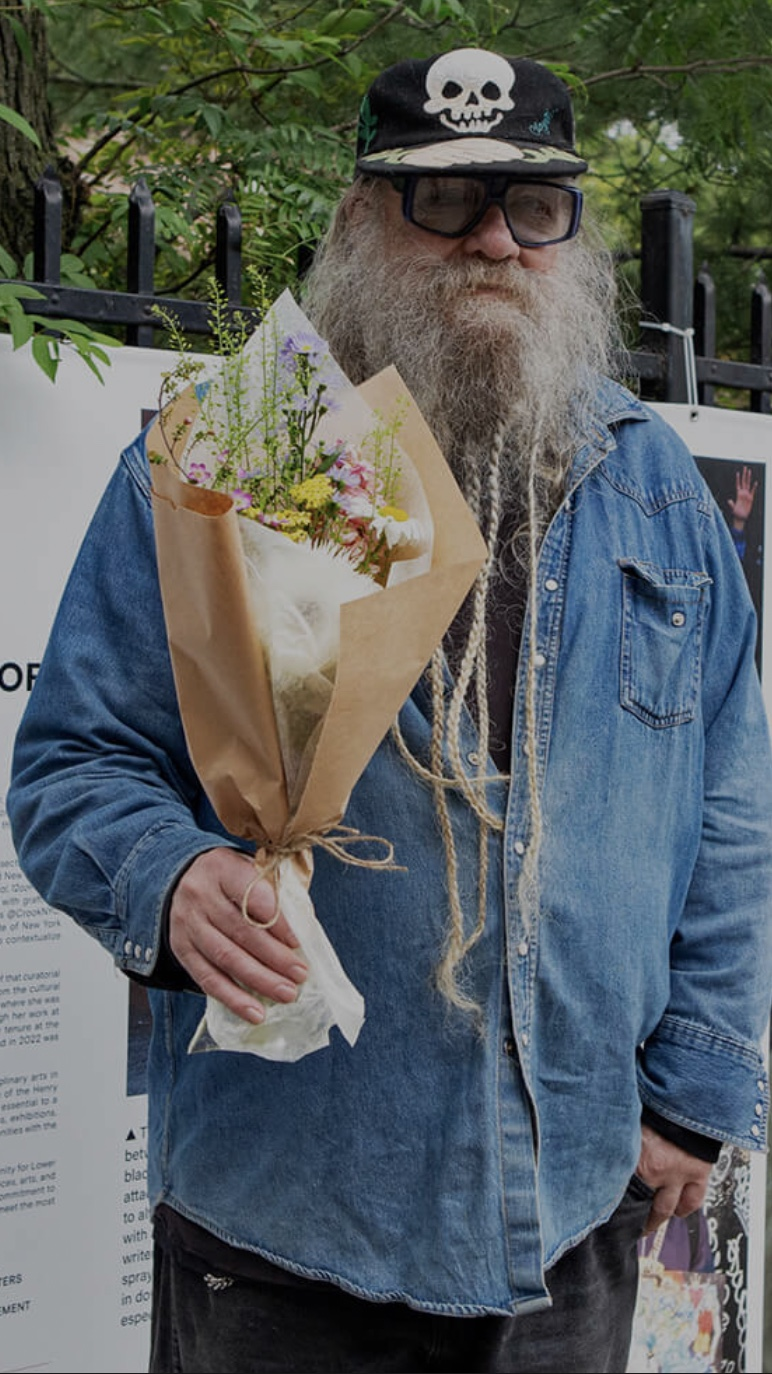
- Patterson in October 2024
- Born: October 9, 1948 (age 78); Calgary, Alberta, Canada
- Known for: Photography

Clayton Patterson (born October 9, 1948) is a Canadian-born artist, photographer, videographer and folk historian. Known for his collaborative style of portrait photography, his work has focused almost exclusively on documenting the Lower East Side of Manhattan.

== Early life ==
Patterson was born on October 9, 1948, in rural Alberta, Canada. Growing up in "the bad end of the working class", he left home at 15 and studied art at various colleges across Canada. He moved to New York City in 1979 with his partner Elsa Rensaa.

== Career ==
Since 1982, Patterson has maintained a residence, workspace, and gallery at 161 Essex Street in the Lower East Side.

In 1986, Patterson opened the storefront of 161 Essex, the building he and his wife Elsa Rensaa were living in and paying a mortgage on, as the Clayton Gallery and Outlaw Museum.Artists who have shown at the museum include Dash Snow, Boris Lurie, Herbert Huncke, and Taylor Mead.

=== Photography ===
Patterson is known for his "Wall of Fame", in which he photographs people posing at his front door and later displays prints of them in the windows of his building. Says Patterson:

The window was active 24 hours a day. You could hear tapping on the window and excited voices, 'Mira! Mira! Mira!' The majority of the Front Door people were Hispanics. Anglos, for the most part, just did not get the concept, but the locals sure did. … I was out to make everyone who wanted fame famous in the hood. And famous they became.

The photos were later collected in "Clayton Patterson's Front Door Book" (2009, O.H.W.O.W. Press, Miami).

==== Tompkins Square Park police riot ====
On August 6 and 7, 1988, police clashed with the young anarchist squatter population in Tompkins Square Park on the Lower East Side causing a massive riot. Patterson had initially gone out to video tape a performance at the Pyramid Club, but noticed a lot of activity around the park as well as a sizable police presence. The restless, anarchistic, politically active, squatter population was gathering in protest over the newly enforced 1am curfew. When the riot broke out, Patterson began taping the incident in full detail. His footage from the night's events (some 3+ hours) became instrumental in exposing police brutality and resulted in the indictment of six NYPD officers. As a result, New York District Attorney Robert Morgenthau ordered Patterson to surrender his tapes and camera. Patterson refused the order and was sentenced to 90 days in jail. After a 10-day hunger strike, Patterson was ultimately released after turning over a copy of the video.

=== Tattoo ===
In 1986 Patterson and Ari Roussimoff created the Tattoo Society of New York with the assistance of Elsa Rensaa. Roussimoff left the Society in 1989, and its leadership was carried on by Patterson and Rensaa. In 1997, Wes Wood, L.E.S. City Councilwoman Kathryn Freed, and Patterson worked successfully to make tattooing once again legal in NYC.

=== Clayton archive ===
Patterson's collection of photography, video, art, press clippings, and books comprise a vast archive of Lower East Side history. The collection includes approximately half a million print photos, hundreds of thousands of digital photos, thousands of hours of video tape in multiple formats and numerous artworks by Patterson and Rensaa as well as other New York artists. The archive also consists of various ephemera from the streets of New York City including brand stamped glassine heroin bags, protest banners and fliers, graffiti stickers and art.

In addition to the hours of Tompkins Square Park footage, the video archive contains a large number of interviews, concerts, and street protests (including the ACT UP AIDS protest). Patterson's documentation of the NYC hardcore punk scene of the 1980s and early 1990s includes footage of Bad Brains, Murphy's Law, Sick of it All, Reagan Youth, Sheer Terror and G.G. Allin. His videos interviews with artists Richard Kern, Nick Zedd, Joe Coleman, Annie Sprinkle, H.R. Giger, Kembra Pfahler (of the Voluptuous Horror of Karen Black), Ira Cohen, Pyramid Club dancers Phoebe Legere, Dee Finley, folk historian and ethnomusicologist Harry Smith and numerous tattoo artists, colorful characters and NYC community leaders comprise an extensive historical document of the city.

== Captured ==
In 2008, Clayton Patterson's life and work were the subject of the documentary film Captured. The film was directed by Ben Solomon and Daniel Levin and produced by Jenner Furst. Marc Levin was the executive producer. The New York electroclash band A.R.E. Weapons contributed original music to the film.

== Personal life ==
In April 2014, The New York Times' Alan Feuer reported that Patterson was considering leaving New York City for the Austrian spa town of Bad Ischl. Patterson is quoted as saying of NYC, that "[t]here's nothing left for me… The energy is gone. My community is gone. I'm getting out… I didn't really leave the Lower East Side. It left me." Patterson ultimately changed his plans and remained in New York City.

== Publications ==
- Inside Out: The Art World of the Squats. Clayton Patterson, Alan W. Moore, Laura Zelasnic, editors. (1994, Printed Matter, New York.)
- Wildstyle: History of a New Idea. Clayton Patterson and Jochen Auer, editors. (2003, Unique Publications, New York).
- Captured: A Film/Video History of the Lower East Side. Clayton Patterson, Paul Bartlett, Urania Mylonas, editors. (2005, Seven Stories Press, New York) ISBN 1-58322-674-5
- Resistance: A Radical Social and Political History of the Lower East Side. Clayton Patterson, editor. (2007, Seven Stories Press, New York). ISBN 1-58322-745-8
- Clayton Patterson's Front Door Book. Clayton Patterson with Angel "LA2" Ortiz, Marco Hellraiser & Triby L.E.S. Monica Uszerowicz, editor. (2009, O.H.W.O.W. Press, Miami)
- Jews: A People's History of the Lower East Side (Paperback) (2012, Clayton Books, LLC; 1ST edition). ISBN 0-98578-830-5

== See also ==
- Shelby Hughes, another artist who collected glassine heroin bags
