= Stu Mead =

American artist

- Born: Stuart Mead; Iowa, United States
- Education: Minneapolis College of Art and Design
- Known for: Painting, Drawing, Printmaking

Stuart "Stu" Mead is an American artist who lives and works in Berlin, Germany.

== Work ==
In April, 2004 a group exhibition called "When Love Turns to Poison" was held at the Kunstraum Bethanien in Berlin, showing, among other works by Mead, the painting "First Communion," which was destroyed during the exhibition by a religion-obsessed vandal. The exhibition of eight artists became a national scandal, with conservative newspapers declaring it pornographic and non-art. Controversy also developed around an exhibition of Mead's work at Hyaena Gallery in Burbank, California in 2008, when four artists associated with the gallery left it in protest against Mead's exhibition. In 2009 Mead participated in the exhibition loop "Öffentliche Erregung" (Public Arousal), at loop – raum für aktuelle kunst Berlin, Germany Berlin, Germany Group exhibition that dealt specifically with the gray zone where art approaches the pornographic. In 2010 Mead's work was included in a large exhibition at Villa Merkel/Bahnwarterhaus in Esslingen, Germany called "Family Jewels", in which artist Damien Deroubaix presented a family tree of the artists who have influenced his work.

=== Exhibitions (selection) ===
- 2020 E^{2}/Sterput, "Nympha Stumeadiana", Brussels, Belgium
- 2014 MOHS exhibit, "Stu Mead: Road to Hell", Copenhagen, Denmark
- 2013 Galerie Crystal Ball, "Monster Girls", Berlin, Germany
- 2012 Galerie Toxic, "Order-Chaos", Luxembourg, Luxembourg
- 2012 Taco-che, "Fente Asia", Tokyo, Japan
- 2011 Märkisches Museum Witten, "das widerspenstige Fleisch" (Rudolf Schlichter), Witten, Germany
- 2010 Villa Merkel/Bahnwarterhaus, "Family Jewels", Esslingen, Germany
- 2010 Aeroplastics contemporary,"Alchemy of Delusion", Brussels, Belgium
- 2009 The Horse Hospital, "The Impossible World of Stu Mead", London, England
- 2009 loop – raum für aktuelle kunst,"Öffentliche Erregung", Berlin, Germany
- 2008 Bongout Gallery, "Mollusk Kollektiv", Berlin
- 2006 Institut de Cultura La Capella, "BerlinTendenzen", Barcelona, Spain
- 2005 Vanilla Gallery, Tokyo, Japan
- 2004 Kunstraum Kreuzberg/Bethanien, "When Love Turns to Poison", Berlin, Germany
- 2003 endart, "Stu Mead", Berlin, Germany
- 2003 Un Regard Moderne, "Stu Mead", Paris, France
- 2003 Emily Tsingou Gallery,"Please Don't Make Me Cry", Curated by Georgina Starr, London, England
- 2003 Track 16 Gallery,"Le Dernier Cri: Legendary Publishers of the International Underground", Los Angeles, California, USA
- 1999 Kiehle Gallery, St. Cloud State University, "Stu Mead", St. Cloud, Minnesota, USA

== Publications ==
- The Immortal MAN BAG Journal of Art (with Frank Gaard), Le Dernier Cri, 1999
- Miniput, Le Dernier Cri, 2003
- Devil's Milk, Le Dernier Cri, 2005
- Krampussy, Le Dernier Cri, 2008
- Men beg (with Frank Gaard), Le Dernier Cri, 2011
- Fentasia, Le Dernier Cri, 2012
- Nympha Stumeadiana (with a text by Déline Luca), E^{2}, 2020
