= Abdominal compartment syndrome =

- Specialty: Emergency medicine

Abdominal compartment syndrome (ACS) is a life-threatening condition that occurs when the abdomen becomes subject to increased pressure reaching past the point of intra-abdominal hypertension (IAH). Normally, the abdomen has a steady state pressure influenced by the strength of the abdominal wall and the contents of the abdominal cavity; this is known as the intra-abdominal hypertension (IAH). In hospitalized patients, the average IAH is 6.5 mmHg while in patients who are critically ill, the IAH can be between 12 and 16 mmHg. ACS is present when intra-abdominal pressure rises and is sustained at > 20 mmHg and there is new organ dysfunction or failure. It is not a disease and as such it occurs in conjunction with many disease processes, either due to the primary illness or in association with treatment interventions. Specific cause of abdominal compartment syndrome is not known, although some causes can be sepsis and severe abdominal trauma. Increasing pressure reduces blood flow to abdominal organs and impairs pulmonary, cardiovascular, renal, and gastro-intestinal (GI) function, causing obstructive shock, multiple organ dysfunction syndrome and death.

== Classification of etiology ==
Abdominal compartment syndrome is classified into three groups: Primary, secondary and recurrent ACS.

Primary Abdominal Compartment Syndrome

Primary ACS is classified as causes of elevated IAH resulting from trauma, injuries or pathologic processes originating from INSIDE the abdominal cavity. The following are examples:

- Peritoneal tissue edema secondary to diffuse peritonitis, abdominal trauma
- Peritoneal trauma secondary to emergency abdominal operations
- Reperfusion injury following bowel ischemia due to any cause
- Retroperitoneal and mesenteric inflammatory edema secondary to acute pancreatitis
- Ileus and bowel obstruction
- Intra-abdominal masses of any cause
- Abdominal packing for control of bleeding
- Closure of the abdomen under undue tension
- Acute pancreatitis with abscesses formation

Secondary Abdominal Compartment Syndrome

Secondary ACS is classified as causes of elevated IAH from a condition originating OUTSIDE of the abdominal cavity. Often secondary ACS is associated with massive fluid resuscitation (also known as changes in fluid status). The following are examples:

- Fluid therapy due to massive volume resuscitation
- Retroperitoneal hematoma secondary to trauma and aortic rupture
- Ascites (intra-abdominal fluid accumulation)

Recurrent/Tertiary Abdominal Compartment Syndrome

Recurrent/Tertiary ACS is classified when the elevated IAH recurs after initial treatment of the primary or secondary ACS.

== Epidemiology ==
While it is reported that 30% to 49% of critically ill patients have IAH (not ACS, as not >20 mmHg or no evidence of new end organ dysfunction), it is reported that the prevalence of ACS is 3.6% in critically ill patients. ACS is more commonly found in patients residing in the surgical intensive care units as compared to the medical intensive care units due to the increased risk factors of burns, trauma to the abdomen, and large volume transfusions. Most ACS is predicted to be due from primary causes due to diligent evaluation of large volume resuscitation efforts.

Some risk factors that make it more likely to develop ACS include:

- >5 L of crystalloid within 24 hours
- Transfusion of >10 units of packed red blood cells in 24 hours
- Hypothermia (<33 °C)
- Acidosis (pH <7.2, base deficit <014 mmol/L)
- BMI >30
- Burns over 50% total body surface area OR with inhalation injury
- Intra-abdominal pathology

== Pathophysiology ==
Abdominal compartment syndrome occurs when tissue fluid within the peritoneal and retroperitoneal space (either edema, retroperitoneal blood or free fluid in the abdomen) accumulates in such large volumes that the abdominal wall compliance threshold is crossed and the abdomen can no longer stretch. Once the abdominal wall can no longer expand, any further fluid leaking into the tissue results in fairly rapid rises in the pressure within the closed space. Initially this increase in pressure does not cause organ failure but does prevent organs from working properly – this is called intra-abdominal hypertension and is defined as a pressure over 12 mmHg in adults. ACS is defined by a sustained IAP(intra-abdominal pressure) above 20 mmHg with new-onset or progressive organ failure. These pressure measurements are relative. Small children get into trouble and develop compartment syndromes at much lower pressures while young previously healthy athletic individuals may tolerate an abdominal pressure of 20 mmHg very well. The underlying cause of the disease process is capillary permeability caused by the systemic inflammatory response syndrome (SIRS) that occurs in every critically ill patient. SIRS leads to leakage of fluid out of the capillary beds into the interstitial space in the entire body with a profound amount of this fluid leaking into the gut wall, mesentery and retroperitoneal tissue.

Abdominal compartment syndrome follows a destructive pathway similar to compartment syndrome of the extremities. When increased compression occurs in such a hollow space, organs will begin to collapse under the pressure. As the pressure increases and reaches a point where the abdomen can no longer be distended it starts to affect the cardiovascular and pulmonary systems. When abdominal compartment syndrome reaches this point without surgery and help of a silo the patient will most likely die. There is a high mortality rate associated with abdominal compartment syndrome.

== Diagnosis ==
Abdominal compartment syndrome is defined as an intra-abdominal pressure above 20 mmHg with evidence of organ failure. Abdominal compartment syndrome develops when the intra-abdominal pressure rapidly reaches certain pathological values, within several hours (intra-abdominal hypertension is observed), and lasts for 6 or more hours. The key to recognizing abdominal compartment syndrome is the demonstration of elevated intra-abdominal pressure which is performed most often via the urinary bladder, and it is considered to be the "gold standard". The increased intra-abdominal pressure leads to compression of the renal veins, which, in turn, to an oliguria that is unresponsive to fluid resuscitation. Diagnosis should be based on clinical findings in conjunction with a measurement of a bladder pressure. The trend of the bladder pressure may be more helpful than the absolute number.

Multiorgan failure includes damage to the cardiac, pulmonary, renal, neurological, gastrointestinal, abdominal wall, and ophthalmic systems. The gut is the most sensitive to intra-abdominal hypertension, and it develops evidence of end-organ damage before alterations are observed in other systems. In a recent systematic review, Holodinsky et al. described 25 risk factors associated with IAH (intra-abdominal hypertension) and 16 with ACS (abdominal compartment syndrome). These can be roughly categorized in three categories, which may be more helpful at the bedside to identify patients at risk (Table 1). Especially noteworthy is the potential role of fluid resuscitation in the development of IAH and ACS. Recognizing the pivotal role of fluid resuscitation in the pathogenesis of IAH and ACS supplies the clinician with a target for preventive measures. Large volume resuscitation with crystalloids should be avoided in patients with or at risk of ACS.

Table 1 When to suspect intra-abdominal hypertension and abdominal compartment syndrome
Abdominal catastrophes	Severe organ dysfunction	Fluid balance
Trauma, peritonitis, acute pancreatitis, ruptured abdominal aortic aneurysm Often post-surgery	Metabolic respiratory renal hemodynamic	>3000–4000 mL in 24 h window

== Treatment ==
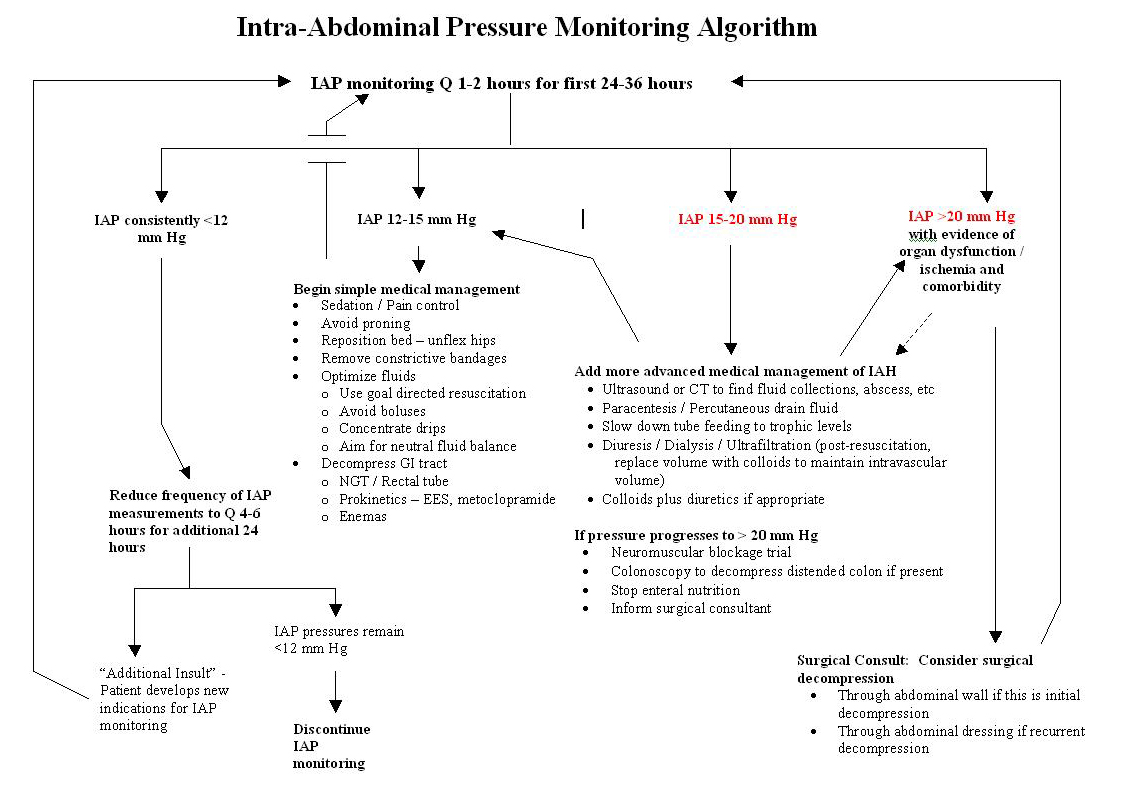
Treatment algorithm for IAH/ ACS

=== Operative decompression ===
The mortality rate associated with abdominal compartment syndrome is significant, ranging between 60% and 70%. The poor outcome relates not only to abdominal compartment syndrome itself but also to concomitant injury and hemorrhagic shock. The surgical decompression of the abdomen remains the treatment of choice of abdominal compartment syndrome; this usually improves the organ changes and is followed by one of the temporary abdominal closure techniques in order to prevent secondary intra-abdominal hypertension. Surgical decompression can be achieved by opening the abdominal wall and abdominal fascia anterior in order to physically create more space for the abdominal viscera. Once opened, the fascia can be bridged for support and to prevent loss of domain by a variety of medical devices (Bogota bag, artificial bur, and vacuum devices using negative pressure wound therapy).
