= List of Guggenheim Fellowships awarded in 1968 =

Two hundred and ninety-one scholars, scientists, and artists were chosen from 2,053 applicants to receive Guggenheim Fellowships in 1968. A total of $2,196,500 was disbursed. Of the 91 institutions represented, University of California, Berkeley had the most grants (19), followed by Columbia University (15) and Yale University (13).

== 1968 United States and Canadian Fellows ==
| Category | Field of Study | Fellow | Institutional association | Research topic | Notes | Ref |
|---|---|---|---|---|---|---|
| Creative Arts | Choreography | Alvin Ailey | Alvin Ailey American Dance Theater | | | |
| Creative Arts | Drama and Performance Art | Leon Gillen | | | | |
| Creative Arts | Drama and Performance Art | Sam Shepard | | | Also won in 1971 | |
| Creative Arts | Fiction | R. V. Cassill | Brown University | Writing | | |
| Creative Arts | Fiction | Mark R. Smith | University of New Hampshire | Writing | | |
| Creative Arts | Fiction | Robert A. Stone | Yale University | Writing | | |
| Creative Arts | Film | Bruce Baillie | | | | |
| Creative Arts | Film | Robert Hughes | | | | |
| Creative Arts | Film | Andrew Sarris | Columbia University | | | |
| Creative Arts | Fine Arts | Darby Bannard | | Painting | | |
| Creative Arts | Fine Arts | Gandy Brodie | The New School for Social Research | Painting | | |
| Creative Arts | Fine Arts | Paolo Buggiani | | Sculpture | | |
| Creative Arts | Fine Arts | Jack Bush | | Painting | | |
| Creative Arts | Fine Arts | Robert De Niro | School of Visual Arts, The New School for Social Research | Painting | | |
| Creative Arts | Fine Arts | Friedel Dzubas | University of Pennsylvania | Painting | Also won in 1966 | |
| Creative Arts | Fine Arts | Leon Golub | School of Visual Arts | Graphics | | |
| Creative Arts | Fine Arts | Philip Guston | New York Studio School of Drawing, Painting and Sculpture | Painting | Also won in 1947 | |
| Creative Arts | Fine Arts | Donald Judd | | Three-dimensional art | | |
| Creative Arts | Fine Arts | Herbert Katzman | School of Visual Arts | Graphics | | |
| Creative Arts | Fine Arts | Alison Knowles | | Computer-generated poem (The House of Dust) translated into a physical structure and built in Chelsea, Manhattan | | |
| Creative Arts | Fine Arts | Jacob Landau | Pratt Institute | Painting | | |
| Creative Arts | Fine Arts | Samuel Maitin | Philadelphia Museum of Art, University of Pennsylvania | Painting | | |
| Creative Arts | Fine Arts | George J. McNeil | Pratt Institute | Painting | | |
| Creative Arts | Fine Arts | Douglas Ohlson | Hunter College | Painting | | |
| Creative Arts | Fine Arts | Ludwig Sander | | Painting | | |
| Creative Arts | Fine Arts | Tony Smith | Hunter College | Sculpture | | |
| Creative Arts | Fine Arts | Anthony Sorce | Nazareth University | Studio adaptation of advanced industrial materials and fabrication | | |
| Creative Arts | Fine Arts | Albert Stadler | | Painting | | |
| Creative Arts | Fine Arts | David Weinrib | School of Visual Arts | Sculpture | | |
| Creative Arts | Fine Arts | Neil Williams | | | | |
| Creative Arts | Fine Arts | Norman Zammitt | University of Southern California | Sculpture | | |
| Creative Arts | Music Composition | Stephen Albert | | Composition | Also won in 1978 | |
| Creative Arts | Music Composition | Luciano Berio | Juilliard School | Composition | | |
| Creative Arts | Music Composition | William Bolcom | Queens College, City University of New York | Composition | Also won in 1964 | |
| Creative Arts | Music Composition | Robert Cogan | New England Conservatory of Music | Composition | | |
| Creative Arts | Music Composition | John Corigliano | | Composition | | |
| Creative Arts | Music Composition | Jacob Druckman | Juilliard School | Composition | Also won in 1957 | |
| Creative Arts | Music Composition | Gil Evans | | Composition | | |
| Creative Arts | Music Composition | Richard Felciano | University of California, Berkeley | Composition | | |
| Creative Arts | Music Composition | James P. Giuffre | | Composition | | |
| Creative Arts | Music Composition | Lawrence K. Moss | Yale University | Composition | Also won in 1959 | |
| Creative Arts | Music Composition | Vincent Persichetti | Juilliard School | Composition | Also won in 1958, 1973 | |
| Creative Arts | Music Composition | Robert Suderburg | University of Washington | Composition | Also won in 1974 | |
| Creative Arts | Music Composition | Charles Wuorinen | Columbia University | Composition | Also won in 1972 | |
| Creative Arts | Photography | Richard F. Conrat | | | | |
| Creative Arts | Photography | David Plowden | | | | |
| Creative Arts | Photography | W. Eugene Smith | | | Also won in 1956, 1957 | |
| Creative Arts | Poetry | Thomas Kinsella | Southern Illinois University | Writing | Also won in 1971 | |
| Creative Arts | Poetry | Howard Nemerov | Brandeis University | Writing | | |
| Creative Arts | Poetry | L. E. Sissman | Kenyon & Eckhardt Advertising | Six-week vacation | | |
| Creative Arts | Poetry | Gary S. Snyder | | Writing | | |
| Humanities | African Studies | Robert Lee Hess | University of Illinois Chicago | | | |
| Humanities | American Literature | Richard Bridgman | University of California, Berkeley | Gertrude Stein's literary career | | |
| Humanities | American Literature | Lawrence Sanford Dembo | University of Wisconsin–Madison | Avant-gard poetry | | |
| Humanities | American Literature | Horst Frenz | Indiana University | European influences upon the work of Eugene O'Neill | | |
| Humanities | American Literature | Joseph John Moldenhauer | University of Texas at Austin | Editions of Thoreau's Maine Woods and Journal | | |
| Humanities | American Literature | Roger B. Stein | University of Washington | | | |
| Humanities | Architecture, Planning and Design | Nathan Silver | University of Cambridge School of Architecture | Meaning and purpose of contemporary architecture | | |
| Humanities | Bibliography | Donald C. Gallup | Yale University | | Also won in 1961 | |
| Humanities | British History | Archibald Smith Foord | | | Also won in 1949 | |
| Humanities | British History | Robert Eric Frykenberg | University of Wisconsin–Madison | History of religious conflict and social unrest in South India during the 19th century | | |
| Humanities | British History | David C. Moore | University of California, Los Angeles | | | |
| Humanities | British History | John Joseph Murray | Coe College | Influence of the Flemish Low Countries on Tudor-Stuart England | | |
| Humanities | British History | Trygve R. Tholfsen | Teachers College, Columbia University | Working Class Radicalism in Mid-Victorian England (published 1977) | | |
| Humanities | Classics | George M. A. Hanfmann | Harvard University | Greek art and culture | | |
| Humanities | Classics | C. J. Herington | University of Texas at Austin | Edition of Aeschylus's Prometheus Bound and its scholia | | |
| Humanities | Classics | George Emmanuel Mylonas | Washington University in St. Louis | Excavation of the second grave circle of Mycenae | Also won in 1955 | |
| Humanities | Classics | Erich Segal | Yale University | Menander | | |
| Humanities | East Asian Studies | Kwang-Ching Liu | University of California, Davis | Modernization of China, 1870-1880 | | |
| Humanities | East Asian Studies | Frederick W. Mote | Princeton University | Cultural history of China, 1260-1400 AD | Also won in 1987 | |
| Humanities | East Asian Studies | Edward H. Schafer | University of California, Berkeley | Hainan Island from the earliest times to the 11th century | Also won in 1953 | |
| Humanities | East Asian Studies | Denis Sinor | Indiana University | History of the civilization of Central Eurasia | Also won in 1981 | |
| Humanities | Economic History | Samuel Hollander | University of Toronto | Assumptions concerning technology in the work of the classical economists, 1776-1874 | | |
| Humanities | Economic History | Charles Issawi | Columbia University | | Also won in 1961 | |
| Humanities | Economic History | Harry Alvin Miskimin, Jr. | Yale University | | | |
| Humanities | English Literature | Patrick Cruttwell | Kenyon College | Study of the Bath Chronicle | | |
| Humanities | English Literature | Morris Golden | University of Massachusetts Amherst | Jonathan Swift, Samuel Johnson, William Wordsworth | | |
| Humanities | English Literature | Robert Halsband | Columbia University | | Also won in 1982 | |
| Humanities | English Literature | John Leon Lievsay | Duke University | Paolo Sarpi's The History of the Council of Trent | | |
| Humanities | English Literature | S. P. Rosenbaum | University of Toronto | Significance of modern British philosophy for modern British literature | | |
| Humanities | English Literature | John D. Rosenberg | Columbia University | | | |
| Humanities | English Literature | Charles H. Shattuck | University of Illinois Urbana-Champaign | | Also won in 1961 | |
| Humanities | English Literature | Harry Stone | California State University, Northridge | Ways in which fairytales and myths entered Charles Dickens' writing and shaped his art | | |
| Humanities | English Literature | Edward W. Tayler | Columbia University | | | |
| Humanities | English Literature | Stanley Weintraub | Pennsylvania State University | Effect of World War I on Bernard Shaw | | |
| Humanities | Fine Arts Research | Max Kozloff | | History of modern art criticism | | |
| Humanities | Fine Arts Research | Irving Lavin | New York University | A study of Gianlorenzo Bernini's Chapel of St. Teresa in Santa Maria della Vittoria, Rome | | |
| Humanities | Fine Arts Research | Lucy R. Lippard | Art International | Ad Reinhardt | | |
| Humanities | Fine Arts Research | Bernard Teyssèdre | Université de Montréal | Art theory and criticism in France, 1695-1721 | | |
| Humanities | Fine Arts Research | Cornelius Clarkson Vermeule | Museum of Fine Arts, Boston; Boston University | Popular art of the Hellenistic and Roman periods in Greece and Asia Minor | | |
| Humanities | French History | Orest A. Ranum | Columbia University | | | |
| Humanities | French History | Lionel Rothkrug | University of Michigan | | | |
| Humanities | French Literature | Frank Paul Bowman | University of Pennsylvania | | Also won in 1986 | |
| Humanities | French Literature | Gerard J. Brault | Pennsylvania State University | Analytical edition of the Song of Roland | | |
| Humanities | French Literature | Julien Serge Doubrovsky | Smith College | | Also won in 1965 | |
| Humanities | French Literature | Maurice A. Lecuyer | Rice University | Jean Giono | | |
| Humanities | French Literature | Jeanne R. Monty | Tulane University | | | |
| Humanities | General Nonfiction | Réjean Ducharme | | Creative writing | | |
| Humanities | General Nonfiction | Paul H. Shepard | Williams College (visiting) | Ecological implications of man's primate origins and hunter forebears | | |
| Humanities | German and Scandinavian Literature | Stuart Atkins | University of California, Santa Barbara | Johann Wolfgang von Goethe and other Renaissance writers | Also won in 1954 | |
| Humanities | German and Scandinavian Literature | Edgar Lohner | Stanford University | | | |
| Humanities | German and Scandinavian Literature | Franz Heinrich Mautner | Swarthmore College | Johann Nestroy's plays and their recent theatrical history | Also won in 1964 | |
| Humanities | German and Scandinavian Literature | Eckehard Simon | Harvard University | | | |
| Humanities | History of Science and Technology | Sanborn C. Brown | Massachusetts Institute of Technology | | | |
| Humanities | History of Science and Technology | Derek John de Solla Price | Yale University | | | |
| Humanities | Iberian and Latin American History | Norman Gall | Princeton University | Guerilla movement and social revolution in the Andes | | |
| Humanities | Iberian and Latin American History | Ursula S. Lamb | Yale University | | | |
| Humanities | Latin American Literature | Fredrick B. Pike | University of Notre Dame | Pan-Hispanic movement in Spain and Latin America during the early 20th century | | |
| Humanities | Linguistics | Yuen Ren Chao | University of California, Berkeley | System of general Chinese characters and their romanization | Also won in 1954 | |
| Humanities | Linguistics | Jaan Puhvel | University of California, Los Angeles | | | |
| Humanities | Literary Criticism | Thomas McLernon Greene | Yale University | | | |
| Humanities | Literary Criticism | Louis Kronenberger | Brandeis University | | | |
| Humanities | Literary Criticism | Herbert S. Lindenberger | Washington University in St. Louis | Critical study of European romanticism through selected works | | |
| Humanities | Literary Criticism | Saul Maloff | | | | |
| Humanities | Medieval History | Jocelyn Nigel Hillgarth | Harvard University | | | |
| Humanities | Medieval History | Speros Vryonis | University of California, Los Angeles | | | |
| Humanities | Medieval Literature | Robert L. Kellogg | University of Virginia | Critical study of the forms of medieval Icelandic narrative art | | |
| Humanities | Medieval Literature | Verdel A. Kolve | Stanford University | | | |
| Humanities | Medieval Literature | Robert M. Lumiansky | University of Pennsylvania | | | |
| Humanities | Medieval Literature | Jeffrey B. Russell | University of California, Riverside | | | |
| Humanities | Medieval Literature | Siegfried Wenzel | University of North Carolina at Chapel Hill | Critical edition of the Fasciculus morum | Also won in 1982 | |
| Humanities | Music Research | Albert Cohen | University of Michigan | | | |
| Humanities | Music Research | H. Wiley Hitchcock | Hunter College | | | |
| Humanities | Near Eastern Studies | Klaus Baer | University of Chicago | | | |
| Humanities | Near Eastern Studies | Thorkild Jacobsen | Harvard University | | | |
| Humanities | Near Eastern Studies | Arthur Võõbus | Lutheran School of Theology at Chicago | | Also won in 1957, 1958 | |
| Humanities | Philosophy | Robert Ackermann | Washington University in St. Louis | | | |
| Humanities | Philosophy | Neal Ward Gilbert | University of California, Davis | History of the Querelle des anciens et des modernes before the 17th century | | |
| Humanities | Philosophy | Stuart Hampshire | Princeton University | Philosophy of the mind | | |
| Humanities | Philosophy | Saul Kripke | Rockefeller University (visiting) | Mathematical logic | Also won in 1977 | |
| Humanities | Philosophy | Julius M. Moravcsik | Stanford University | | | |
| Humanities | Philosophy | Eduardo A. Rabossi | | | Also won in 1991 | |
| Humanities | Religion | Thomas W. Ogletree | Chicago Theological Seminary | Marxism and Christianity in Berlin | | |
| Humanities | Religion | Harry M. Orlinsky | Hebrew Union College – Jewish Institute of Religion | Completion of his book Some Biblical Concepts in their Historical Development | | |
| Humanities | Religion | Norman Perrin | University of Chicago Divinity School | | | |
| Humanities | Renaissance History | Paul O. Kristeller | Columbia University | | Also won in 1957 | |
| Humanities | Renaissance History | Craig R. Thompson | Cornell University | | Also won in 1942, 1954, 1955 | |
| Humanities | Russian History | John M. Thompson | Indiana University | History of the Russian Revolution | | |
| Humanities | Russian History | Robert C. Tucker | Princeton University | Career of Joseph Stalin as a case study in dictatorship and personality | | |
| Humanities | Spanish and Portuguese Literature | Javier Herrero | Duke University | Intellectual life of Spain in the reign of Ferdinand VII | | |
| Humanities | Spanish and Portuguese Literature | Ivan A. Schulman | Washington University in St. Louis | Life and art of José Martí | | |
| Humanities | Theatre Arts | Marvin A. Carlson | Cornell University | French staging practices in the 19th century | | |
| Humanities | Theatre Arts | Esther Merle Jackson | University of Wisconsin–Madison | | | |
| Humanities | United States History | Gunther Barth | University of California, Berkeley | History of urban growth in the Far West, 1850-1900 | | |
| Humanities | United States History | Allan G. Bogue | University of Wisconsin–Madison | Senators in the first Civil War Congress | | |
| Humanities | United States History | Carl Bridenbaugh | University of California, Berkeley | | Also won in 1958, 1962 | |
| Humanities | United States History | Jacob E. Cooke | Lafayette College | Biography of Tench Coxe | | |
| Humanities | United States History | Virginius Dabney | Richmond Times-Dispatch | History of Virginia, from Jamestown to present | | |
| Humanities | United States History | David Sievert Lavender | The Thacher School | Biography of Dr. John McLoughlin | Also won in 1961 | |
| Humanities | United States History | Shaw Livermore, Jr. | University of Michigan | | | |
| Humanities | United States History | Allan Nevins | Henry E. Huntington Library and Art Gallery | | | |
| Humanities | United States History | James T. Patterson | Indiana University | Biography of Robert A. Taft | | |
| Humanities | United States History | Norman Pollack | Wayne State University | | | |
| Humanities | United States History | Carl P. Resek | Sarah Lawrence College, Columbia University | | | |
| Humanities | United States History | Frederick Rudolph | Williams College | Cultural history of the United States, 1830-1860 | Also won in 1957 | |
| Natural Sciences | Applied Mathematics | George F. Carrier | Harvard University | | Also won in 1964 | |
| Natural Sciences | Applied Mathematics | Chaim L. Pekeris | Massachusetts Institute of Technology | Meteorology | Also won in 1946, 1972 | |
| Natural Sciences | Applied Mathematics | Calvin F. Quate | Stanford University | | | |
| Natural Sciences | Applied Mathematics | Clarence Marvin Wayman | University of Illinois Urbana-Champaign | | | |
| Natural Sciences | Astronomy and Astrophysics | Charles P. Sonett | University of Arizona | | | |
| Natural Sciences | Astronomy and Astrophysics | Marshal Henry Wrubel | Indiana University | Theoretical studies in astronomy | | |
| Natural Sciences | Chemistry | Edward M. Arnett | University of Pittsburgh | | | |
| Natural Sciences | Chemistry | Peter A. Beak | University of Illinois Urbana-Champaign | | | |
| Natural Sciences | Chemistry | Sunney I. Chan | California Institute of Technology | | | |
| Natural Sciences | Chemistry | Benjamin Chu | University of Kansas | Structure and dynamics of biological macromolecules | | |
| Natural Sciences | Chemistry | Elias James Corey | Harvard University | | Also won in 1956 | |
| Natural Sciences | Chemistry | Dudley Herschbach | Harvard University | Research at Freiburg University | | |
| Natural Sciences | Chemistry | Frederick R. Jensen | University of California, Berkeley | Physical-organic studies of biochemical processes | | |
| Natural Sciences | Chemistry | Ronald D. Macfarlane | Texas A&M University | Research at University of Paris, Orsay | | |
| Natural Sciences | Chemistry | Philip S. Skell | Pennsylvania State University | Experimental research in physical organic chemistry | | |
| Natural Sciences | Chemistry | Andrew Streitwieser, Jr. | University of California, Berkeley | Application of quantum mechanical methods to organic chemistry | | |
| Natural Sciences | Chemistry | David Henry Templeton | University of California, Berkeley | Dispersion effects in X-ray diffraction | Also won in 1953 | |
| Natural Sciences | Chemistry | T. Darrah Thomas | Princeton University | Experimental studies in nuclear chemistry | | |
| Natural Sciences | Computer Science | Walter J. Karplus | University of California, Los Angeles | | | |
| Natural Sciences | Computer Science | Eugene Wong | University of California, Berkeley | Pattern recognition and image processing problems | | |
| Natural Sciences | Earth Science | Richard Lee Armstrong | Yale University | | | |
| Natural Sciences | Earth Science | Rainer Berger | University of California, Los Angeles | Radiocarbon dating | | |
| Natural Sciences | Earth Science | Brian H. Mason | Smithsonian Institution | | Also won in 1953 | |
| Natural Sciences | Earth Science | James W. Valentine | University of California, Davis | Ecological architecture of the marine biosphere | | |
| Natural Sciences | Engineering | Manson Benedict | Massachusetts Institute of Technology | | | |
| Natural Sciences | Engineering | Ira Bernstein | Massachusetts Institute of Technology | Research in France | | |
| Natural Sciences | Engineering | Donald R. F. Harleman | Massachusetts Institute of Technology | Research at the University of Cambridge | | |
| Natural Sciences | Engineering | William Klement, Jr. | University of California, Los Angeles | | | |
| Natural Sciences | Engineering | Benjamin Y. H. Liu | University of Minnesota | Electrical phenomena in particulate systems | | |
| Natural Sciences | Engineering | Arthur B. Metzner | University of Delaware | Rheological properties of complex fluids | | |
| Natural Sciences | Engineering | John W. Miles | University of California, San Diego | | Also won in 1958 | |
| Natural Sciences | Engineering | Elijah Polak | University of California, Berkeley | Construction of discrete optimal control algorithms | | |
| Natural Sciences | Engineering | Roger A. Schmitz | University of Illinois Urbana-Champaign | Applications of modern control theory and mathematics to regulatory processes in biological systems | | |
| Natural Sciences | Engineering | Richard Manning White | University of California, Berkeley | Systematic study of high-frequency coupling effects in solid-state materials | | |
| Natural Sciences | Engineering | Benjamin Widom | Cornell University | Statistical mechanics of phase transitions | Also won in 1961 | |
| Natural Sciences | Mathematics | Hyman Bass | Columbia University | | | |
| Natural Sciences | Mathematics | Israel N. Herstein | University of Chicago | | Also won in 1960 | |
| Natural Sciences | Mathematics | Takeshi Kotake | Massachusetts Institute of Technology | | | |
| Natural Sciences | Mathematics | Wilhelm Magnus | New York University | | | |
| Natural Sciences | Mathematics | Yiannis N. Moschovakis | University of California, Los Angeles | | | |
| Natural Sciences | Mathematics | Isadore M. Singer | Massachusetts Institute of Technology | | Also won in 1975 | |
| Natural Sciences | Medicine and Health | Endre A. Balazs | Columbia University Irving Medical Center | | | |
| Natural Sciences | Medicine and Health | Alexander G. Karczmar | Stritch School of Medicine | | | |
| Natural Sciences | Medicine and Health | Ronald L. Katz | Columbia University College of Physicians and Surgeons | | | |
| Natural Sciences | Medicine and Health | Stephen I. Morse | Rockefeller University | Research at National Institute for Medical Research | | |
| Natural Sciences | Medicine and Health | Lawrence W. Stark | University of Illinois Chicago/University of California, Berkeley | | | |
| Natural Sciences | Medicine and Health | Osvaldo René Vidal | National Scientific and Technical Research Council | | | |
| Natural Sciences | Molecular and Cellular Biology | Clinton Edward Ballou | University of California, Berkeley | Inositol lipid structure and metabolism | | |
| Natural Sciences | Molecular and Cellular Biology | Richard P. Boyce | Yale University | | | |
| Natural Sciences | Molecular and Cellular Biology | Philip W. Brandt | Columbia University | | | |
| Natural Sciences | Molecular and Cellular Biology | John M. Bremner | Iowa State University | | | |
| Natural Sciences | Molecular and Cellular Biology | Alvin J. Clark | University of California, Berkeley | Bacteriological aspects of bacterial genetics | | |
| Natural Sciences | Molecular and Cellular Biology | Albert Dorfman | University of Chicago | | | |
| Natural Sciences | Molecular and Cellular Biology | Herman T. Epstein | Brandeis University | | | |
| Natural Sciences | Molecular and Cellular Biology | Jacques R. Fresco | Princeton University | Large molecule crystallography | | |
| Natural Sciences | Molecular and Cellular Biology | Edward Glassman | UNC School of Medicine | Neurobiology | | |
| Natural Sciences | Molecular and Cellular Biology | Melvin Martin Green | University of California, Davis | Genetic biology of Drosophila | Also won in 1956 | |
| Natural Sciences | Molecular and Cellular Biology | John E. Hearst | University of California, Berkeley | Metaphase chromosome isolation | | |
| Natural Sciences | Molecular and Cellular Biology | David S. Hogness | Stanford University School of Medicine | | | |
| Natural Sciences | Molecular and Cellular Biology | Jerard Hurwitz | Albert Einstein College of Medicine | | | |
| Natural Sciences | Molecular and Cellular Biology | Lawrence Levine | Brandeis University | | | |
| Natural Sciences | Molecular and Cellular Biology | Lafayette Noda | Geisel School of Medicine | | | |
| Natural Sciences | Molecular and Cellular Biology | Ralph I. Smith | University of California, Berkeley | Physiology of brackish-water invertebrates | | |
| Natural Sciences | Molecular and Cellular Biology | Mortimer P. Starr | University of California, Davis | Phytopathogenic bacteria | Also won in 1957 | |
| Natural Sciences | Molecular and Cellular Biology | Paul K. Stumpf | University of California, Davis | Photobiosynthesis of lipids by isolated chloroplasts | Also won in 1961 | |
| Natural Sciences | Molecular and Cellular Biology | Salih Jawad Wakil | Duke University Hospital | Biological function of membranes | | |
| Natural Sciences | Neuroscience | Arthur LaVelle | University of Illinois College of Medicine | | | |
| Natural Sciences | Organismic Biology and Ecology | Richard D. Alexander | University of Michigan | | | |
| Natural Sciences | Organismic Biology and Ecology | Ransom L. Baldwin Jr. | University of California, Davis | Mammary gland metabolism | | |
| Natural Sciences | Organismic Biology and Ecology | Eric B. Edney | University of California, Riverside | | | |
| Natural Sciences | Organismic Biology and Ecology | James A. McMurtry | University of California, Riverside | | | |
| Natural Sciences | Organismic Biology and Ecology | David J. Randall | University of British Columbia | Respiration and cardiovascular responses in fish | | |
| Natural Sciences | Physics | Julius Ashkin | Carnegie Mellon University | | | |
| Natural Sciences | Physics | Aron M. Bernstein | Massachusetts Institute of Technology | | | |
| Natural Sciences | Physics | Abraham Bers | Massachusetts Institute of Technology | | | |
| Natural Sciences | Physics | Philip James Bray | Brown University | | | |
| Natural Sciences | Physics | David D. Clark | Cornell University | Experimental studies in nuclear structure physics | | |
| Natural Sciences | Physics | Jackie Wayne Culvahouse | University of Kansas | Solid state physics | | |
| Natural Sciences | Physics | Oscar Wallace Greenberg | University of Maryland, College Park | Elementary particle physics | | |
| Natural Sciences | Physics | Alan J. Heeger | University of Pennsylvania | | | |
| Natural Sciences | Physics | Roger H. Hildebrand | University of Chicago | | | |
| Natural Sciences | Physics | Donald F. Holcomb | Cornell University | Modern theory of metals | | |
| Natural Sciences | Physics | John J. Hopfield | Princeton University | Physics of solids | | |
| Natural Sciences | Physics | David Lazarus | University of Illinois Urbana-Champaign | | | |
| Natural Sciences | Physics | Benjamin W. Lee | Stony Brook University | Quantum field theory | | |
| Natural Sciences | Physics | Simon C. Moss | Massachusetts Institute of Technology | Research in Melbourne | | |
| Natural Sciences | Physics | Mark Nelkin | Cornell University | Molecular dynamics of liquids | | |
| Natural Sciences | Physics | Peter Schlein | University of California, Los Angeles | | | |
| Natural Sciences | Physics | Joseph Sucher | University of Maryland, College Park | Elementary particle physics | | |
| Natural Sciences | Physics | Harry Suhl | University of California, San Diego | | | |
| Natural Sciences | Physics | Richard Wilson | Harvard University | | Also won in 1960 | |
| Natural Sciences | Physics | Alfred Chi-Tai Wu | University of Michigan | | | |
| Natural Sciences | Physics | Bruno Zumino | New York University | | Also won in 1987 | |
| Natural Sciences | Plant Science | Harold C. Fritts | University of Arizona | Theory and practice of dendroclimatology | | |
| Natural Sciences | Plant Science | Martin H. Zimmermann | Harvard University | Research at the Swiss Federal Institute of Technology | | |
| Natural Sciences | Statistics | Raghu Raj Bahadur | University of Chicago | | | |
| Natural Sciences | Statistics | Edward Paulson | Queens College, City University of New York | | | |
| Social Sciences | Anthropology and Cultural Studies | Dell H. Hymes | University of Pennsylvania | | | |
| Social Sciences | Anthropology and Cultural Studies | Robert F. Murphy | Columbia University | | | |
| Social Sciences | Anthropology and Cultural Studies | Roy A. Rappaport | University of Michigan | | | |
| Social Sciences | Economics | Gerard Debreu | University of California, Berkeley | Mathematical foundations of economic equilibrium | | |
| Social Sciences | Economics | Dale W. Jorgenson | University of California, Berkeley | Econometrics of investment behavior | | |
| Social Sciences | Economics | Charles Bartlett McGuire | University of California, Berkeley | Economic theory of organization and information | | |
| Social Sciences | Economics | R. Joseph Monsen Jr. | University of Washington | | | |
| Social Sciences | Education | Robert O. Berdahl | San Francisco State University | Research in England | | |
| Social Sciences | Education | Thomas F. Green | Syracuse University | | | |
| Social Sciences | Education | Alan B. Wilson | University of California, Berkeley | Sociology of education | | |
| Social Sciences | Geography and Environmental Studies | Richard Harris | University of Toronto | Seigneurial geography of Canada, 1760-1853 | | |
| Social Sciences | Law | W. J. Jones | University of Alberta | The courts and their officials in Elizabethan and early Stuart England | | |
| Social Sciences | Law | Arthur Taylor von Mehren | Harvard University | Research at the University of Rome | | |
| Social Sciences | Political Science | Robert Agger | University of Oregon | Comparative study of community political systems | | |
| Social Sciences | Political Science | Gordon E. Baker | University of California, Santa Barbara | Theoretical background of representation | | |
| Social Sciences | Political Science | David J. Danelski | Yale University | | | |
| Social Sciences | Political Science | Robert G. Gilpin, Jr. | Princeton University | Interaction of technological advances and international relations | | |
| Social Sciences | Political Science | Mark J. Kesselman | Columbia University | | | |
| Social Sciences | Political Science | Robert L. Pfaltzgraff Jr. | University of Pennsylvania | | | |
| Social Sciences | Political Science | Sidney G. Tarrow | Yale University | | | |
| Social Sciences | Political Science | Kurt Tauber | Williams College | Political and social philosophy of postwar German conservatism | | |
| Social Sciences | Political Science | Oran R. Young | Princeton University | Construction of a systemic paradigm for the analysis of international politics | | |
| Social Sciences | Political Science | Roland Young | Northwestern University | | Also won in 1958 | |
| Social Sciences | Psychology | Julian Hochberg | New York University | | | |
| Social Sciences | Psychology | Eric H. Lenneberg | University of Michigan | | | |
| Social Sciences | Psychology | O. Ivar Lövaas | University of California, Los Angeles | | | |
| Social Sciences | Psychology | Warner Muensterberger | SUNY Downstate Medical Center | | | |
| Social Sciences | Psychology | George Sperling | Bell Telephone Labs | Perception and short-term memory | | |
| Social Sciences | Psychology | Norman Earl Zinberg | Harvard Medical School | | | |
| Social Sciences | Sociology | Amitai Etzioni | Columbia University | | | |
| Social Sciences | Sociology | Peter R. Heintz | University of Zurich, Fundación Bariloche | | | |
| Social Sciences | Sociology | Jane Cassels Record | University of Portland | "Changing pattern of Negro-white relations in a Deep South community" | | |
| Social Sciences | Sociology | Lionel Tiger | University of British Columbia | Role of biological and social factors in human association | | |
| Social Sciences | Sociology | Marvin Eugene Wolfgang | University of Pennsylvania | | Also won in 1957 | |
| Social Sciences | Sociology | John Milton Yinger | Oberlin College | Comparative study of the sources and consequences of pluralism | | |

== 1968 Latin American and Caribbean Fellows ==
| Category | Field of Study | Fellow | Institutional association | Research topic | Notes | Ref |
|---|---|---|---|---|---|---|
| Creative Arts | Fiction | Max Aub | National Autonomous University of Mexico | Writing | Also won in 1966, 1971 | |
| Creative Arts | Fiction | José Donoso | | Writing | Also won in 1973 | |
| Creative Arts | Fiction | Salvador Elizondo | National Autonomous University of Mexico | Writing | Also won in 1973 | |
| Creative Arts | Fiction | Juan Rulfo | | Writing | | |
| Creative Arts | Fiction | Samuel Selvon | | Writing | Also won in 1955 | |
| Creative Arts | Fine Arts | Oscar Magnan | | | | |
| Creative Arts | Fine Arts | Federico Manuel Peralta Ramos | | La última cena, a performance and luxury dinner at the Alvear Palace Hotel | | |
| Creative Arts | Music Composition | León Schidlowsky | University of Chile | Composition | | |
| Creative Arts | Music Composition | Antonio Tauriello | Conservatorio Nacional de Música | Composition | | |
| Creative Arts | Poetry | Alejandra Pizarnik | | Writing | | |
| Humanities | Architecture, Planning and Design | José Antonio Priani Piña | National Autonomous University of Mexico | | | |
| Humanities | Fine Arts Research | Marta Traba | Bogotá Museum of Modern Art | Dos décadas vulnerables en las artes plásticas latinoamericanas, 1950-1970 (published 1973) | | |
| Humanities | Fine Arts Research | Jesús Urzagasti | Instituto Latinoamericano de Relaciones Internacionales | | | |
| Humanities | Linguistics | Ana María Barrenechea | Torcuato di Tella Institute | | | |
| Humanities | Literary Criticism | Edgardo Cozarinsky | | | Also won in 1975 | |
| Natural Sciences | Astronomy and Astrophysics | Braulio Iriarte | National Autonomous University of Mexico, University of Arizona | Nature and evolution of stellar systems | | |
| Natural Sciences | Earth Science | Darcy Closs | Federal University of Rio Grande do Sul | | | |
| Natural Sciences | Earth Science | Luis Guillermo Durán Solano | National University of Colombia | Submarine geology in the Caribbean | | |
| Natural Sciences | Medicine and Health | Joaquín Luco Valenzuela | Pontifical Catholic University of Chile | | Also won in 1937, 1938, 1957 | |
| Natural Sciences | Mathematics | Manfredo Perdigão do Carmo | | | Also won in 1965 | |
| Natural Sciences | Molecular and Cellular Biology | José Mordoh | National Scientific and Technical Research Council | | Also won in 1970 | |
| Natural Sciences | Neuroscience | Pedro Rudomín Zevnovaty | National Institutes of Health (visiting) | | Also won in 1959 | |
| Natural Sciences | Organismic Biology and Ecology | Jorge W. Abalos | National University of Córdoba | Research at Harvard University | | |
| Natural Sciences | Organismic Biology and Ecology | Braulio Orejas-Miranda | Museo Nacional de Historia Natural Cubana | | | |
| Natural Sciences | Physics | Mario Eusebio Foglio | Bariloche Atomic Centre | | | |
| Natural Sciences | Plant Sciences | Luis Eduardo Mora-Osejo | National University of Colombia | Research at Harvard University and the Smithsonian Institution | | |
| Natural Sciences | Plant Sciences | Raulino Reitz | Herbário Barbosa Rodrigues | | Also won in 1954 | |
| Social Sciences | Anthropology and Cultural Studies | Demetrio Sodi Morales | Instituto Indigenista Interamericano | | | |
| Social Sciences | Law | Genaro R. Carrió | | | | |
| Social Sciences | Political Science | Manuel Maldonado-Denis | University of Puerto Rico | | | |

== See also ==
- Guggenheim Fellowship
- List of Guggenheim Fellowships awarded in 1967
- List of Guggenheim Fellowships awarded in 1969
