= David J. Danelski =

American lawyer and academic

David Joseph Danelski (born October 29, 1930) is an American lawyer and academic who is the Mary Lou and George Boone Centennial Professor and Director of the Stanford in Washington Program and Professor of Political Science (Teaching), emeritus at Stanford University.

He has been a professor of political science at a number of other institutions, with his longest stint being at Cornell University during the 1970s, and he has won several awards for his teaching. His specialties have included constitutional law of the United States, civil liberties in the United States, and the history and politics of the Supreme Court of the United States. He has worked as a lawyer in private practice as well in civil rights cases, and volunteered his services during the Mississippi Freedom Summer of 1964.

== Early life ==
Danelski was born on October 29, 1930, in Green Bay, Wisconsin. He attended Green Bay East High School, graduating in 1948.

He attended nearby St. Norbert College from 1948 to 1950 but did not earn a degree.

== Degrees and early career ==
He entered the DePaul University College of Law, earning an LL.B. degree from there in 1953. He was admitted to the bar in Illinois in 1953.\

During 1953, Danelski served as a reserve officer in the United States Navy Judge Advocate General's Corps with a rank of ensign. He remained a JAG officer during 1954.

He married Jill Parmer in 1954. They went on to have five children, with the family following him to his various positions, and she worked as an educational administrator.

Then Danelski went to Seattle University, where he completed a B.A. degree in 1955. He was admitted to the bar in Washington state in 1955, after which he was a partner in the law firm of Patrick & Danelski in Mount Vernon, Washington, from 1955 to 1956.

Following that, he went to the University of Chicago, where he received an M.A. in 1957. While in Chicago, he acted as a research attorney for the American Bar Foundation from 1957 to 1959.

He also worked as an instructor and assistant professor of political science at the University of Illinois Urbana-Champaign from 1959 to 1961, in particular teaching constitutional law (he may have been at UIUC a year earlier, in 1958). While there, in 1960 he became involved in the defense of Leo Koch, an assistant professor of biology who was terminated by the university president after making public remarks regarding sexual relations among students that did not conform to the 1950s-style morality of the time. The matter, which touched upon questions of academic freedom and freedom of speech in the United States, became front-page-headline news in the Chicago Daily Tribune. Danelski's actions got him on the wrong side of the university administration as well and, lacking tenure, he soon departed.

During this time, he remained working on his doctorate at the University of Chicago, and taking advantage of two fellowships, earned his Ph.D. in 1961. His dissertation was entitled "The Chief Justice and the Supreme Court".

== Middle career ==
By 1964, he was affiliated with the University of Washington, having started as an assistant professor there in 1961.

During 1963 and 1964, Danelski acted as a counsel for the American Civil Liberties Union in Washington. In 1964, during Mississippi Freedom Summer, he became one of several lawyers from the Seattle area to travel to Mississippi and volunteer their services. As such, he gave legal representation to civil rights workers in Mississippi.

He then moved across country to Yale University, where he was an associate professor beginning in 1964. During his time at Yale, he was awarded a Guggenheim Fellowship in 1968. He was also named a Fulbright scholar, and as that spent the 1968–69 academic year as a lecturer at the University of Tokyo. In 1969, while at Yale, he received from the Danforth Foundation a Harbison Prize for excellence in teaching.

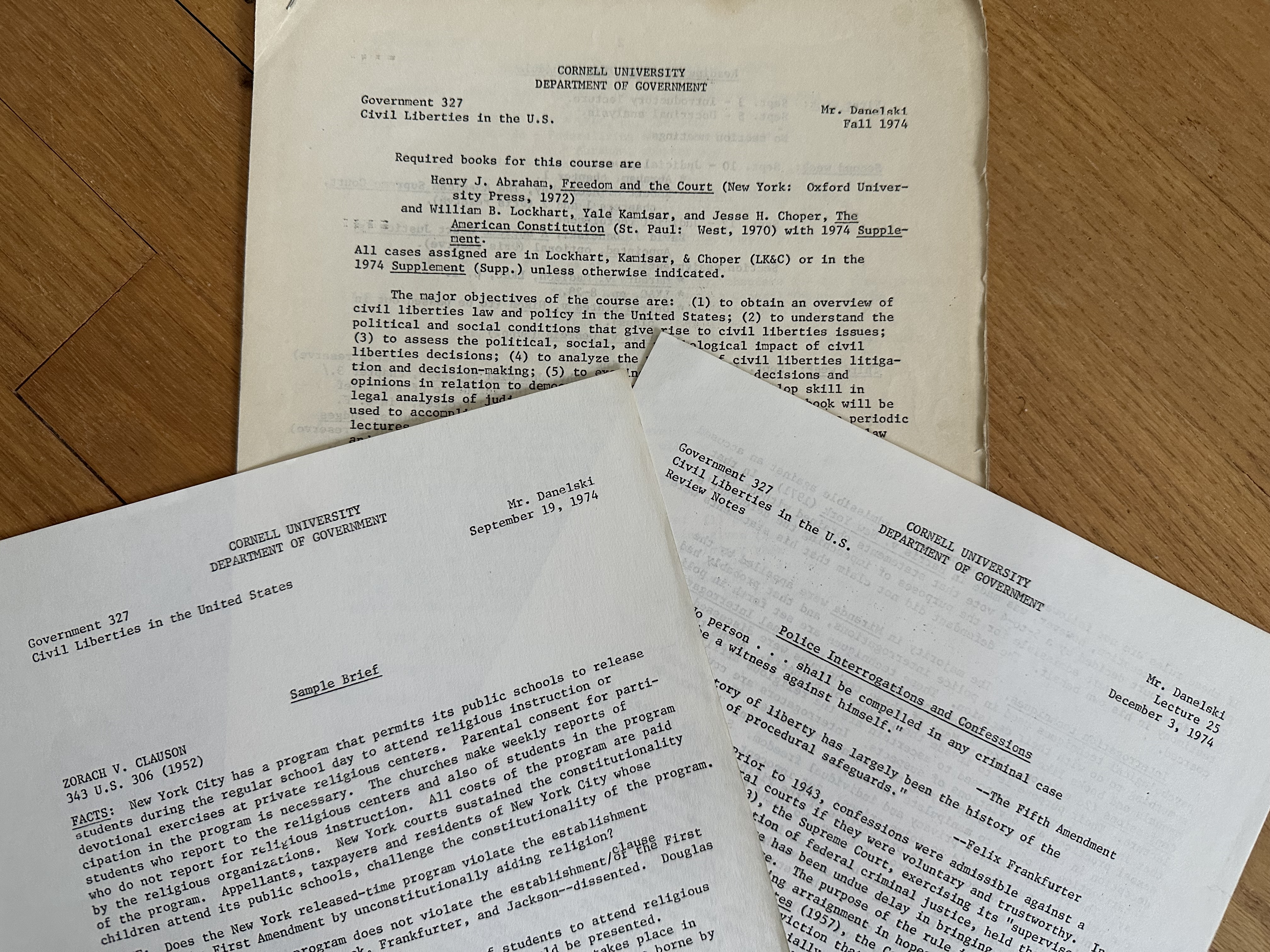
Portions of the reading list, notes for a lecture, and a sample brief used in Danelski's Fall 1974 course at Cornell, Government 327 "Civil Liberties in the United States"

Danelski came to Cornell University in Fall 1970 as a professor of public law and judicial behavior, and he and his family lived in Ithaca, New York. The Cornell Daily Sun viewed Danelski's reputation as such to headline its story "Liberal To Join Gov't Faculty". Danelski then became the Goldwin Smith Professor of Government at Cornell, having been named to that endowed chair in 1973.

Courses that Danelski taught at Cornell included "Civil Liberties in the United States", "Constitutional Politics", a freshman seminar in "Law and Society", and a two-semester interdisciplinary upperclass seminar in "Law and Social Science".

Danelski served as a University Ombudsman at Cornell from 1973 to 1975. In that role, Danelski sought to mediate conflicts within the university community.

== Later career ==
Danelski moved back west in 1979, becoming a professor of political science at Stanford University. He was also a partner in the Seattle law firm of Schroeter, Goldmark & Bender around this time; later he would maintain an "of counsel" title with them.

For the 1980–81 year, Danelski was a recipient of the Dean's Award for Distinguished Teaching, given out by the university's School of Humanities and Sciences.

Subsequently, he became the Cecil H. and Louise Gamble Professor of Political Science, Dean of the Faculty, and vice-president for Academic Affairs at Occidental College.

He later returned to Stanford, and in 1988 he moved to the nation's capital in order to establish the Stanford in Washington program. This was a year-round successor to an earlier Stanford in Government internship program, and Danelski became the first director of it. Danelski stayed in that position until he retired from Stanford in 1993.

After his retirement, Danelski continued to do research and writing and have visiting appointments at universities.

== Scholarship ==
In 1973, Danelski co-edited with Joseph S. Tulchin a volume of autobiographical notes of Chief Justice Charles Evans Hughes. A review in the Boston University Law Review called the job they did "thorough, precise, and well-documented", although it preferred that the editors pursue several critical analyses further than they did.

In the wake of the very controversial Robert Bork Supreme Court nomination, Danelski participated in a conference at Northwestern University to discuss the history behind such nominations and the ramifications of what had happened. Danelski's contribution examined the history of Supreme Court appointments being evaluated on an ideological basis; in it, Danelski found a middle ground between those who believed that ideological objections to nominations were historically common and those who believed them rare.

By 1994, Danelski was working on a biography of Justice William O. Douglas while working as a visiting professor at Whitman College, which Douglas had attended. A decade later Danelski was said to still be working on the volume, and was defending Douglas against published allegations that the justice had fabricated or embellished many aspects of his life story. One chapter of the biography was published as a journal article in 2015.

== Selected publications ==
- "The Influence of the Chief Justice in the Decisional Process", in W. F. Murphy and C. Herman Pritchett, Courts, Judges and Politics (Random House, 1961, several editions since then), 497–508
- A Supreme Court Justice Is Appointed (New York: Random House, 1964)
- "Values as Variables in Judicial Decision-Making: Notes toward a Theory", Vanderbilt Law Review 19, no. 3 (June 1966): 721–740
- "Conflict and its resolution in the Supreme Court", Journal of Conflict Resolution 11, no. 1 (March 1967): 71–86
- Comparative Judicial Behavior: Cross-Cultural Studies of Political Decision-Making in the East and West (Oxford University Press, 1969) [co-editor with Glendon Schubert]
- The Autobiographical Notes of Charles Evans Hughes (Harvard University Press, 1973) [co-editor with Joseph S. Tulchin]
- "Toward Explanation of Judicial Behavior", University of Cincinnati Law Review 42, no. 4 (1973): 659–666
- "Ideology As a Ground for the Rejection of the Bork Nomination ", Northwestern University Law Review 84, nos. 3 & 4 (1989–1990): 900–920
- "The Saboteurs' Case", Journal of Supreme Court History 1996, no. 1 (1996): 61–82
- Constitutional Law: Civil Liberty and Individual Rights, Third Edition on [co-author with William Cohen], with some additional supplements; latest Sixth Edition (Foundation Press, 2007) [additional co-author David A. Yalof]
- The Chief Justice: Appointment and Influence (University of Michigan Press, 2016) [co-editor with Artemus Ward]
