= The French Revolution: A History =

1837 book by Thomas Carlyle

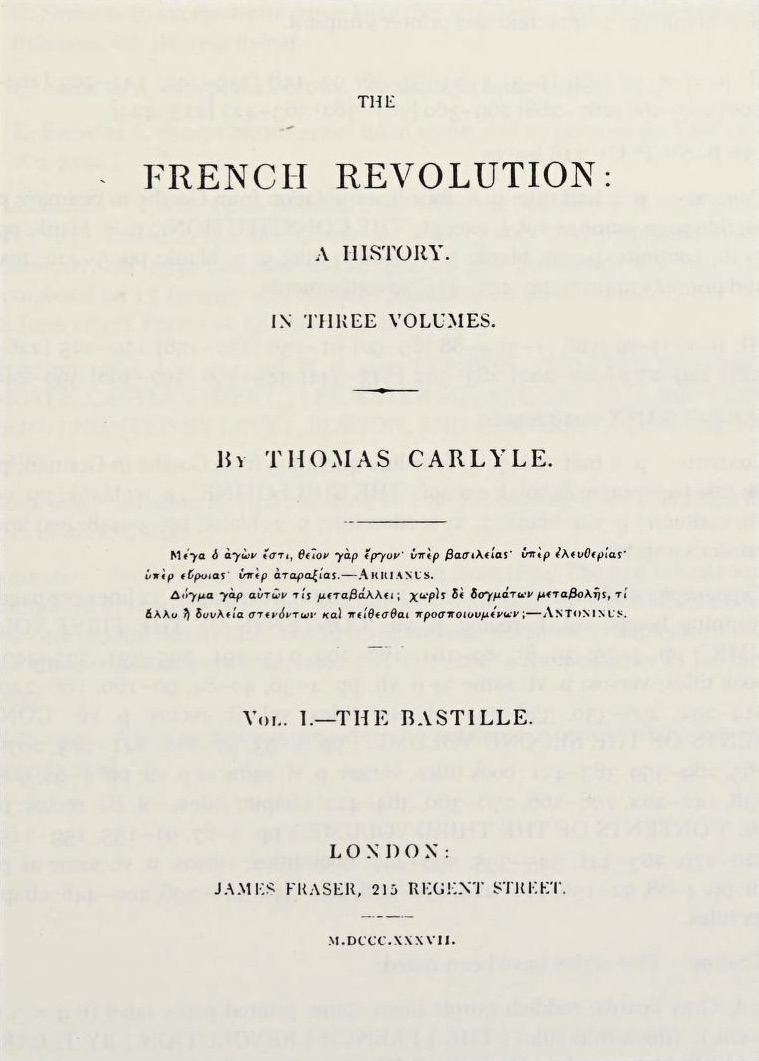
- Title page of the first English edition
- Author: Thomas Carlyle
- Language: English
- Subject: The French Revolution
- Published: 1837
- Publisher: James Fraser
- Publication place: England

The French Revolution: A History was written by the Scottish essayist, historian and philosopher Thomas Carlyle. The three-volume work, first published in 1837 (with a revised edition in print by 1857), charts the course of the French Revolution from 1789 to the height of the Reign of Terror (1793–94) and culminates in 1795. A massive undertaking which draws together a wide variety of sources, Carlyle's history—despite the unusual style in which it is written—is considered to be an authoritative account of the early course of the Revolution.

== Production ==
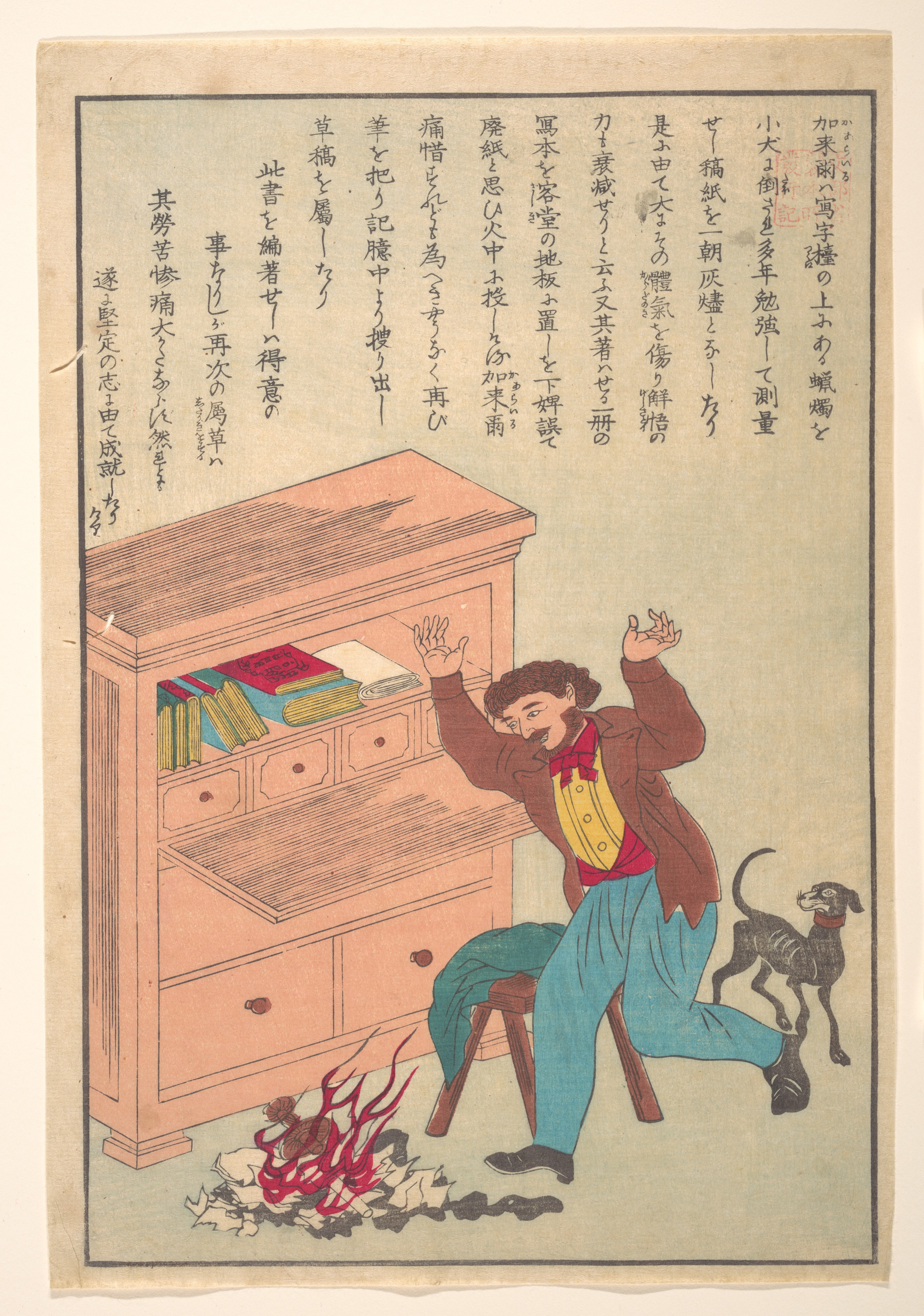
A Japanese illustration of Carlyle's horror at the burning of the original manuscript of The French Revolution

John Stuart Mill, a friend of Carlyle's, found himself caught up in other projects and unable to meet the terms of a contract he had signed with his publisher for a history of the French Revolution. Mill proposed that Carlyle produce the work instead; Mill even sent his friend a library of books and other materials concerning the Revolution, and by 1834 Carlyle was working furiously on the project. When he had completed the first volume, Carlyle sent his only complete manuscript to Mill. While in Mill's care the manuscript was destroyed, according to Mill, by a careless household maid who mistook it for trash and used it as a firelighter. Carlyle then rewrote the entire manuscript, achieving what he described as a book that came "direct and flamingly from the heart."

== Style ==
As a historical account, The French Revolution has been both enthusiastically praised and bitterly criticized for its style of writing, which is highly unorthodox within historiography. Where most professional historians attempt to assume a neutral, detached tone of writing, or a semi-official style in the tradition of Thomas Babington Macaulay, Carlyle unfolds his history by often writing in present-tense first-person plural as though he and the reader were observers, indeed almost participants, on the streets of Paris at the fall of the Bastille or the public execution of Louis XVI. This, naturally, involves the reader by simulating the history itself instead of solely recounting historical events.

Carlyle further augments this dramatic effect by employing a style of prose poetry that makes extensive use of personification and metaphor—a style that critics have called exaggerated, excessive, and irritating. Supporters, on the other hand, often label it as ingenious. John D. Rosenberg, a Professor of humanities at Columbia University and a member of the latter camp, has commented that Carlyle writes "as if he were a witness-survivor of the Apocalypse. [...] Much of the power of The French Revolution lies in the shock of its transpositions, the explosive interpenetration of modern fact and ancient myth, of journalism and Scripture." For example, when recounting the death of Robespierre under the axe of the Guillotine, Carlyle writes:

All eyes are on Robespierre's Tumbril, where he, his jaw bound in dirty linen, with his half-dead Brother and half-dead Henriot, lie shattered, their "seventeen hours" of agony about to end. The Gendarmes point their swords at him, to show the people which is he. A woman springs on the Tumbril; clutching the side of it with one hand, waving the other Sibyl-like; and exclaims: "The death of thee gladdens my very heart, m'enivre de joi"; Robespierre opened his eyes; "Scélérat, go down to Hell, with the curses of all wives and mothers!" -- At the foot of the scaffold, they stretched him on the ground till his turn came. Lifted aloft, his eyes again opened; caught the bloody axe. Samson wrenched the coat off him; wrenched the dirty linen from his jaw: the jaw fell powerless, there burst from him a cry; — hideous to hear and see. Samson, thou canst not be too quick!

Thus, Carlyle invents for himself a style that combines epic poetry with philosophical treatise, exuberant story-telling with scrupulous attention to historical fact. The result is a work of history that is perhaps entirely unique, and one that is still in print nearly 200 years after it was first published. With its (ambivalent) celebration of the coming of democracy, and its warning to the Victorian aristocracy, the work was celebrated by Lord Acton as "the volumes that delivered our fathers from thraldom to Burke".

== Reception and influence ==
Carlyle's radical departure from the classical histories of the eighteenth century came as a shock to Victorian critics. Lady Morgan found the mere publishing of such a work premature and superfluous while censuring Carlyle's style. William Makepeace Thackeray found the style initially difficult yet ultimately rewarding and called the book's appearance "timely". Mill praised the work lavishly, announcing that "This is not so much a history as an epic poem."

The book immediately established Carlyle's reputation as an important 19th-century intellectual. It also served as a major influence on a number of his contemporaries, including Charles Dickens, who compulsively carried the book around with him, and drew on it while producing A Tale of Two Cities for his crowd scenes in particular. The book prompted Oscar Wilde to say of Carlyle, "How great he was! He made history a song for the first time in our language. He was our English Tacitus." Wilde would later attempt to purchase Carlyle's table on which the history was written. Ralph Waldo Emerson thought that it revealed "an imagination such as never rejoiced before the face of God, since Shakespeare". Mark Twain studied the book closely during the last year of his life, and it was reported to be the last book he read before his death. The Irish revolutionary John Mitchel called the French Revolution "the profoundest book, and the most eloquent and fascinating history, that English literature ever produced." Florence Edward MacCarthy, son of Denis MacCarthy, remarked that "Perhaps more than any other, it stimulated poor John Mitchel & led to his fate in 1848", i.e. imprisonment.

Some critics took issue with Carlyle's style, and his stance on the revolution. William H. Prescott found Carlyle's "attempt to colour so highly what nature has already over-coloured" to be "in very bad taste", producing "a grotesque and ludicrous effect"; he also took issue with Carlyle's "affectations of new-fangled words" and "trite" views. In his January 1840 review, Giuseppe Mazzini argued that Carlyle misunderstood the Revolution because he lacked the "true conception of Humanity," not recognising "any collective life or collective aim. He recognises only individuals."

The book deeply influenced Alexander Herzen's philosophical work From the Other Shore (1848–1850).

Martin Luther King Jr. often quoted from the third chapter of the sixth book of volume one, saying: "We shall overcome, because Carlyle is right, 'No lie can live forever.'"

=== France ===
A French translation of the history appeared between 1865 and 1867, eliciting positive notices from Barbey d'Aurevilly, who preferred him to Jules Michelet, and from Léon Bloy, who decried the total neglect of Carlyle's history by his compatriots. Michelet, who saw the Revolution as creative rather than destructive as Carlyle did, criticized the latter's history in 1868 as a "wretched work," "devoid of study" and "full of false flights," elsewhere remarking that "it is the work of an artist, but not a work of art." Hippolyte Taine, writing in 1864, characterized Carlyle as a "modern Puritan" who saw "nothing but evil in the French Revolution" and was unjustly critical of Voltaire and the French Enlightenment.

== See also ==
- Reflections on the Revolution in France

== Bibliography ==
- Cobban, Alfred (1963). "Carlyle's French Revolution," History, Vol. XLVIII, No. 164, pp. 306–316.
- Cumming, Mark (1988). A Disimprisoned Epic: Form and Vision in Carlyle's French Revolution. Philadelphia: University of Pennsylvania Press.
- Edwards, Owen Dudley (2007). "Carlyle and Catholicism, Part I: Hilaire Belloc and The French Revolution". Carlyle Studies Annual (23). Saint Joseph's University Press: 79–104. JSTOR 26592985.
  - "Appendix: Hilaire Belloc's 1906 Introduction to Carlyle's The French Revolution". Carlyle Studies Annual (23). Saint Joseph's University Press: 105–118. 2007. JSTOR 26592986.
- Flint, Helen C. (1910). "Indications in Carlyle's "French Revolution" of the Influence of Homer and the Greek Tragedians". The Classical Journal. 5 (3): 118–126. ISSN 0009-8353. JSTOR 3287060.
- Harrold, Charles Frederick (1928). "Carlyle's General Method in the French Revolution," PMLA, Vol. 43, No. 4, pp. 1150–1169.
- Jackson, Holbrook (1948). Dreamers of Dreams: The Rise and Fall of 19th Century Idealism. New York: Farrar, Straus and Company.
- Kerlin, Robert T. (1912). "Contemporary Criticism of Carlyle's 'French Revolution'," The Sewanee Review, Vol. 20, No. 3, pp. 282–296.
- Seigel, Jules Paul, ed. (1971). Thomas Carlyle: The Critical Heritage. The Critical Heritage Series. London: Routledge & Kegan Paul. ISBN 9780710070906.
- Wilson, H. Schütz (1894). "Carlyle and Taine on the French Revolution," The Gentleman's Magazine, Vol. CCLXXVII, pp. 341–359.
