= Piet Hein =

Piet Hein or Piet-Hein may refer to:

== People ==
- Piet Pieterszoon Hein (1577–1629), Dutch naval commander and folk hero
- Piet Hein (scientist) (1905–1996), descendant of the above, Danish poet and scientist
- Piet Hein Donner (born 1948), Dutch politician nicknamed "Piet Hein"
- Piet-Hein Geeris (born 1972), Dutch field hockey player

== See also ==
- Peter Hein (born 1973), Indian action choreographer and stunt coordinator
- Peter Hein (rower) (born 1943), German rower
- Peter Heine (1928–2005), South African cricketer
- Peter Heintz (1920–1983), Swiss sociologist
- Peter Heinz (born 1954), German sports shooter
- Peter Heine Nielsen (born 1973), Danish chess grandmaster

== Ships ==
- Dutch ship Piet Hein (1810), an 80-gun ship of the line of the navy of the Batavian Republic, never launched
- French ship Piet Hein (1813), a 74-gun ship of the line of the French Navy
- HNLMS Piet Hein (1894), a coastal defence ship of the Royal Netherlands Navy
- HNLMS Piet Hein (1929), a destroyer of the Royal Netherlands Navy
- HNLMS Piet Hein (F811), a frigate of the Royal Netherlands Navy
- Piet Hein (royal yacht) (1937), a wedding gift to Princess Juliana of the Netherlands
