= Paolo Buggiani =

Italian artist (born 1933)

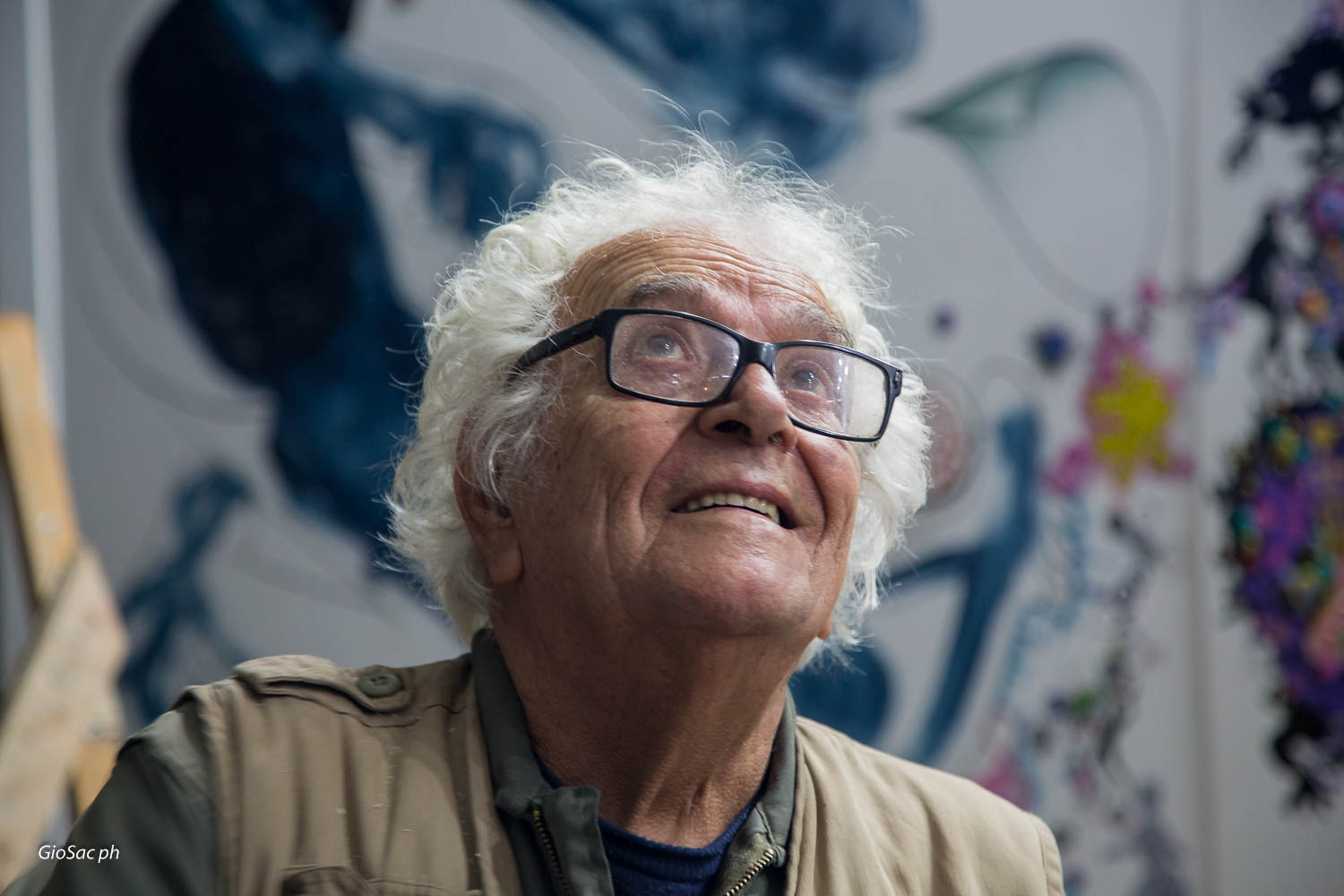
- Paolo Buggiani backstage in 2014
- Born: 9 May 1933 (age 92); Castelfiorentino, Florence, Italy
- Education: Contemporary Art, Rome
- Awards: Guggenheim Fellowship, 1968

Paolo Buggiani (born 9 May 1933) is an Italian contemporary artist. His work is characterized by using dynamic media superimposed on an existing cityscape, rather than using static media, like figures that are skating, sailing, or running while on fire, spray paint on snow, wearable art or painted plexiglass held before an in situ background. His urban performances are aimed at creating an immediate and unexpected interaction with the public on the street.

== Early life ==
Paolo Buggiani was born in the small city of Castelfiorentino, Florence, Italy. In the early fifties he moved to Rome, where he studied Contemporary Art.

== Early career ==
In 1956, he participated in a national competition Incontri della Gioventù where he won first place together with the Italian painter Giuseppe Romagnoni. Shortly after, he exhibited at the Rome Quadriennale (1955-1956), participated in an exposition at the Brooklyn Museum in 1957 and was invited to the first Salon des Cent organized by the Brooklyn Museum along with thirty-one other artists of the Roman Avantgarde including Giulio Turcato and Giuseppe Uncini. In June 1957 he had his first solo exposition at the Schneider gallery in Rome curated by Corrado Cagli. He arrived in Paris in 1958, and during his stay, Buggiani met Wifredo Lam who introduced him to the gallery Glasier-Cordiè where he had a solo exhibition.

== Career ==
In 1962 he moved to New York and in 1968 he received the Guggenheim Fellowship for Sculpture in America with his experiments called the Vacuum Forming System. Returning to Italy in May 1968, he was active in both Rome and Milan. Buggiani's range of work at the time included: Ephemeral Sculpture in Motion (performance art and installations), Paintings over Reality (landscapes photographed through painted crystal) and Wearable Art (handpainted jumpsuits).

In 1977 he created the artwork for the jazz album Threads by Steve Lacy, Frederic Rzewski and Alvin Curran on Italian Horo Records. When he returned to New York in 1979, he started his research on his series named Mechanical Reptiles and Urban Mythology. These burning sculptures in sheet metal placed into the urban environment, like Wall Street or the Brooklyn Bridge, brought him popularity as one of the members of the Street Art Movement of that time together with other New York street artists like, Ken Hiratsuka, Linus Coraggio (all members of a group called the Rivington School), Richard Hambleton, and a young Keith Haring. During his time in New York in 1981-1982, he preserved several early chalk subway drawings from Keith Haring before he rose to fame, an operation documented in several books and expositions.

In 2017-2018 he had a retrospective exhibition in the Palazzo Medici Riccardi in Florence, Italy, curated by Gianluca Marziani. Also in 2018 he presented a retrospective at the Museo Laboratorio d'Arte Contemporanea (a spinoff from the Sapienza University of Rome, at the Palazzo del Rettorato), collecting his work from the mid-1950s to today.

Since 1979 he has been dividing his time between New York and the medieval town of Isola Farnese, near Rome.

== Film ==
In 2018 he contributed to The Man Who Stole Banksy, a documentary nominated for the 2018 Tribeca Film Festival.

== Awards ==
In 1968 he received the Guggenheim Fellowship for Sculpture in America.
