= Arleen Schloss =

American performance artist (1943–2026)

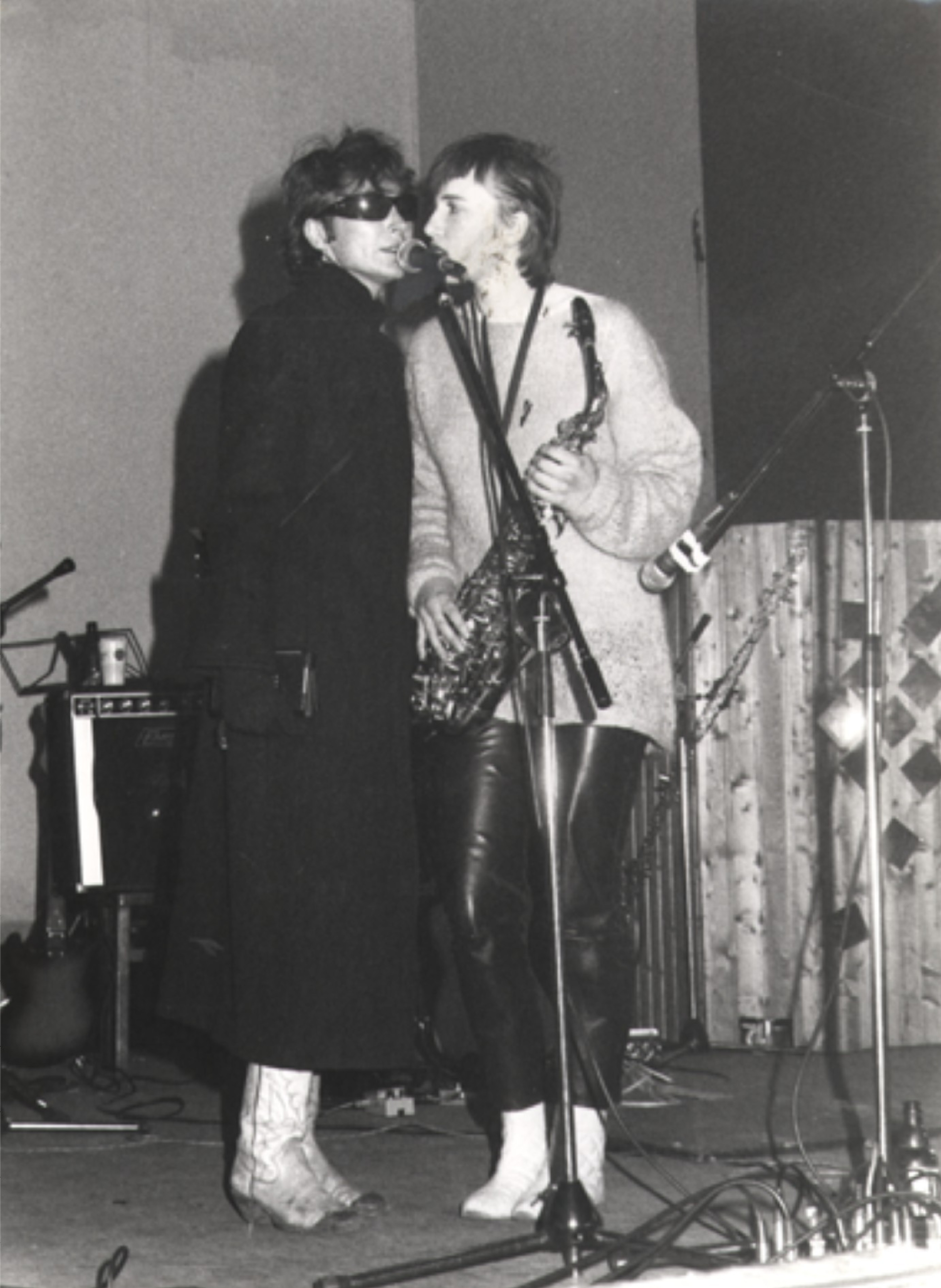
- Arleen Schloss (left) in Martin Kippenberger's SO 36, Berlin, January 1980
- Born: December 12, 1943; Brooklyn, New York U.S.
- Died: May 23, 2026 (aged 82)
- Education: Bank Street College of Education, Art Students League of New York, Parsons School of Design, New York University
- Alma mater: New York University
- Known for: Performance art; video/film art; sound poetry; directing; curating; A's interdisciplinary loft space
- Style: Performance art; video art; sound art; multimedia; digital art
- Movement: Downtown Art Scene, No Wave

Arleen Schloss (December 12, 1943 – May 23, 2026) was an American painter, performance artist, video and film artist, sound poet, multimedia director, and art curator of the Lower Manhattan art, video art, performance art, and No Wave music scenes. Schloss began her influence through A's – an interdisciplinary art loft space in New York City that became a hub for noise music, art exhibitions, performance art, films, and art videos. Artists and performers such as Glenn Branca, Y Pants, Jean-Michel Basquiat's noise music band Gray, solo performances by Eric Bogosian, Phoebe Legere's band Monad, pre-Sonic Youth Thurston Moore's post-punk band The Coachmen, Liquid Liquid, Carolee Schneemann, Alan Vega's band Suicide, Martin Wong, and Ai Weiwei performed, exhibited, and got their start at A's. In the 1990s A's became A's Wave where early net art and other forms of digital art were shown.

A 2024 film by Stuart Ginsberg called IT'S A to Z: The ART OF ARLEEN SCHLOSS and a 2021 book by Baptiste Brévart, Guillaume Ettlinger, Guillaume Loizillon, and Pauline Chevalier for Anamosa Books called Wednesday’s At A’s have documented Schloss's no wave period and her A's scene. Art historically, she has been associated with the Rivington School of art which was based on the Lower East Side of Manhattan.

Concurrently with A's, Schloss established herself as a curator, co-organizing shows at Danceteria and the Storefront for Art and Architecture. Jack Tilton and Gracie Mansion both guest curated art exhibitions at A's.

Schloss operated as a performance artist in the 1970s, for example with her performance Words & Music at Bykert Gallery in 1975. The New York Times stated that her performances were "superior to much performance art." and the SoHo Weekly News noted that her voice was "musical the way Patti Smith or Yoko Ono are musical."

== Life and work ==
Schloss studied at the Bank Street College of Education, the Art Students League of New York, and Parsons School of Design and graduated from New York University. Schloss started her career in the galleries of SoHo and the Lower East Side of Manhattan as a painter and performance artist who performed and showed her work in the U.S., Europe, and Asia at venues such as the Franklin Furnace, Betty Parsons Gallery, Bykert Gallery, ABC No Rio, Construction Company, Max Hutchinson Gallery, Lenbachhaus Galeria in Munich, La Nuit Parcourt La Ceil in Belgium, Cafe Einstein in Berlin, The Kitchen, and the Museum of Modern Art in New York City. She taught in the MFA Computer Arts department at the School of Visual Arts.

In subsequent years she performed her media opera A.E.BLA BLA BLA at Ars Electronica in Austria and was a featured guest on Willoughby Sharp's Downtown '86 show, which showcased 1980s performers, artists, and musicians in the year 1986.

Additionally, during the 1980s, she began to get noticed for her sound poetry work, mostly for the audio art piece How She Sees It By Her. Schloss' sound work is included in two publications and anthologies, Just Another Asshole a short-lived no wave art/music/sound art magazine publication published by Glenn Branca and Barbara Ess and "Text-Sound Texts" Edited by Richard Kostelanetz.

She was awarded an 8mm camera from Canon Inc. to experiment with 8mm video. With the camera, she created the travelogue video Sun Daze Away, which showed at Central Park's Summer Stage and at various venues in Europe and Asia. In 1990 Schloss directed and produced the video documentary FromKepler2Cyberspace, with Hi8 equipment loans from Sony. This document featured pioneers of virtual reality, including Dr. Marvin Minsky, John Perry Barlow, Timothy Leary, William Gibson, and Jaron Lanier. During the same period, Schloss filmed a series of interviews with John Cage and included those interviews in a series entitled Windows of Chance/Change. Nickelodeon, because of her video work and art in dealing with the alphabet and children, hired Schloss in 1989 to direct and produce 15 live video excerpts for the animated TV series Eureeka's Castle, which won a Cable ACE Award.

In the 1990s Schloss continued her work with new forms of art and media. She exhibited her electronic work Marbelize at the international digital and technology show at ISEA, in Rotterdam and showed multimedia work on the digital art, radio, and internet program called ArtNetWeb PORT: Navigating Digital Culture at MIT List Visual Arts Center in 1997.

Schloss received various grants, awards, and residencies from The Experimental Television Center, Creative Artists Public Service Grant, New York Foundation for the Arts, Harvestworks, Allied Productions, and the Ford Foundation. She was on the board of Art & Sciences Collaborations Inc, and her work is in the collections of the Fales Library Downtown Collection, AT&T, The Aldrich Contemporary Art Museum, and the 53rd Street Library Donnell Library in New York City. The New York Underground Museum documents her entire oeuvre.

Arleen Schloss died on May 23, 2026, at the age of 82.

== Exhibitions, screenings, films and performances ==
- "Feet" Interactive Installation, Soho, NYC 1970
- "Fore" Director 16 mm experimental film 1970
- "Words & Music" with musician Jack Smead Bykert Gallery New York 1975
- "SNAP - the making of an Elastic composition" Betty Parsons Gallery New York 1976
- "It's A" live performance Robert Freidus Gallery New York 1976 (also 1977 and 1978)
- "A Shot Chance" live performance The Kitchen, New York 1977
- "Its A at MoMA" live Performance, Museum of Modern Art New York 1978
- "How She Sees It" Audio Work Sound Performance, 1979
- "A Shot Chance" Lenbachhaus, Städtische Gallery Munich 1980
- "How She Sees It" (Film Version), Director/Writer/Editor, 1983
- "A. E. Bla Bla Bla" - 24 Hour Media Opera - Ars Electronica Festival, Linz, Austria 1986
- "Glenn Branca Symphony No. 4/Physics" Director/Writer/Editor Videonale, 1984
- "Sun Daze Away" Director/Editor/Writer Central Park Summer Stage, 1989
- "Art Around the Park", Tompkins Square Park, NYC 1992
- "From Kepler 2 Cyberspace: The Pioneers of Virtual Reality," New York 1993
- "Arleen Schloss Retrospective" Städtische Galerie im Butentor Bremen, Germany 1994
- "Nine Dragon Heads", Nature Electronic 2nd International Environmental Festival, Chung Buck, Korea 1997
- "Strange Birds," Group exhibition at Center for Book Arts, NY 2012
- "Arleen Schloss: an evening of Super 8 Film and Hi8 Video," New Museum, 2012
- "Come Closer: Art Around the Bowery," 1969 - 1989, Group exhibition at New Museum, 2012
- "Windows of Chance/Change," (Featuring John Cage) New York No Limits Film Series at the White Box Art Center, NY 2012
- "Art in Flux/Speaking in Tongues," Group Exhibition, New York 2012-2013
- “Coded After Lovelace,” Group Exhibition, White Box Art Center, NY 2014
- “The Printed Room, Works Off Paper” Group Exhibition SALTS Gallery, Switzerland, 2016
- "Archival Showcase" Hauser & Wirth Institute, 2019

== Collections ==
- The Aldrich Contemporary Art Museum, Ridgefield Connecticut, 1970/72
- Lenbachhaus, Munich, Germany, 1981
- Museum of Modern Art Library, New York City, 1982

== Awards ==
- Multi-Media, Soho Tech Award, A's Salon Series, 1980
- ACE Award, The Universe of A, on the making of performance opera, 1987
- ACE Award Manhattan Cable Television, Eureeka's Castle Nickelodeon TV, 1989
