= Ellertshäuser See =

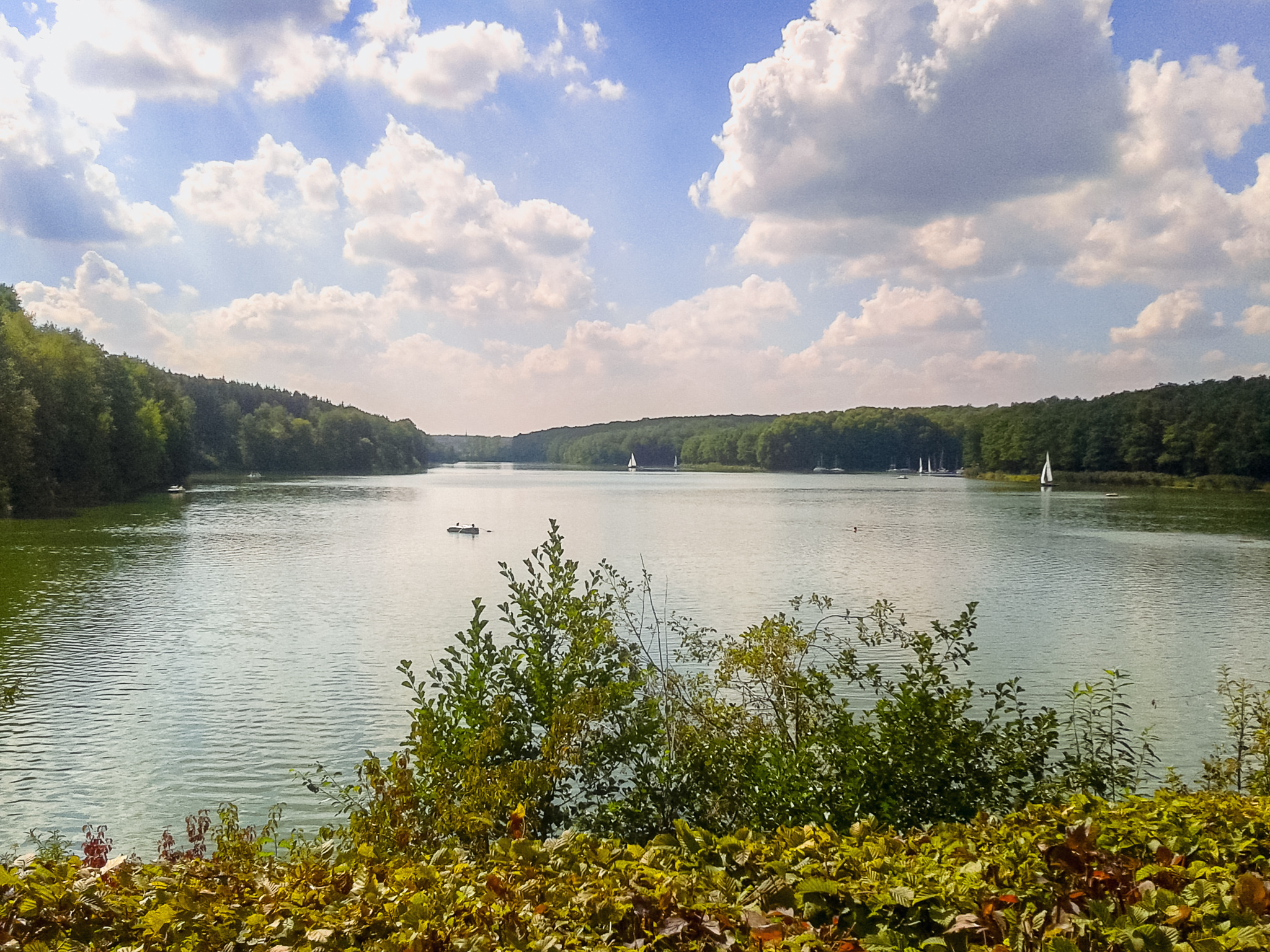
- Ellertshäuser See

- Location within Bavaria
- Location: Stadtlauringen, Bavaria
- Coordinates: 50.148°N 10.375°E
- Type: Artificial lake

The Ellertshäuser See is an artificial lake in the municipality Stadtlauringen in Bavaria, Germany. With a combined water area of 33 hectares, this lake is the biggest lake in Lower Franconia.

== Current usage ==
Nowadays this lake is used mainly for recreation. Many areas are open for swimming, diving, sailing, and fishing. Other areas are Biotopes and therefore protected as Naturschutzgebiet.
