= Liu Kwang-ching =

Chinese-born American historian (1921–2006)

Liu Kwang-ching (劉廣京 b. Beijing 14 November 1921- d. 28 September 2006 Davis, California), who sometimes published under the name K.C. Liu, was a Chinese-born American historian of China. He taught at University of California-Davis from 1963 until his retirement in 1993. He is best known for his scholarship in late-Qing history, astute bibliographical work, and edited volumes, including co-editing Cambridge History of China volumes.

In 1998 a group of colleagues and former students published a two-volume festschrift in honor of his seventy-fifth birthday. The university established the Liu Kwang-ching Lecture Series in his memory.

== Honors and awards ==
In 1968 he received a Guggenheim Fellowship. In 1976, Liu was elected to membership in the Academia Sinica (Taiwan), and served as chairman of its advisory committee of its Institute of Modern History. He served as associate editor of the Journal of Asian Studies, was on the editorial board of the Tsing Hua Journal of Chinese Studies, and on the editorial committee of the University of California Press. In 1988 he delivered the Ch'ien Mu Lectures in History and Culture at New Asia College

== Early life and education ==
Liu was born in Beijing. His mother, Ik-hwa Chen was from a cultured family. Her father Chen Baozhen was a noted scholar of the Qing dynasty, and was an imperial tutor. His father was Juen-yeh Liu, whose ancestral home, Fuzhou. Since his family was Chrisitan, he attended a school run by Methodist missionaries. His father, concerned that his son should learn English, also arranged for an American to give him lessons and sent him to the Diocesan Boys School, an Anglican boarding school in Hong Kong. After the outbreak of the Second Sino-Japanese War in 1937, Liu started college in National Southwest Associated University in Kunming, but left after his junior year to study at Harvard University on a scholarship. He majored in English history, writing his honors thesis on the British philosopher T.H. Green He graduated magna cum laude and earned Phi Beta Kappa. He entered Harvard graduate school in the History Department and studied with Sidney Fay, an eminent diplomatic historian, who advised him that the field of Chinese history might offer better opportunities. Liu's first scholarly article, however, was a study of diplomatic history.

Liu then studied modern Chinese history at Harvard under John K. Fairbank, and was awarded his Ph.D. in 1956. He then worked for six years in the United Nations Secretariat as a translator before returning to Cambridge, where he was a Research Fellow and Instructor. He spent the academic year 1962 at Yale University as Visiting Associate Professor before moving to University of California, Davis, in 1963, where he remained until retirement some thirty years later.

== Scholarly career ==
Modern China: A Bibliographic Guide to Chinese Works, 1898-1937 (Harvard University Press, 1950), edited with John Fairbank, was Liu's first major publication. Fairbank recalled in his memoirs that Liu and Teng Ssu-yu were among the able scholars from China who laid the foundations of China area studies with their bibliographical work. Liu had a “genius for bibliography”, Fairbank wrote, especially for “imagining what historians could do with available materials”. Over the course of three years of preparation, Fairbank and Liu canvassed 1,067 works, organizing entries into topical sections, annotating each item, and compiling indexes for author, title, and topic. In advising graduate students, Fairbank continued, having the book at hand “was like having an extra section of brain, one could carry around, and a lot more reliable.” The review by Sinologist Hellmut Wilhelm reported that the book is much more than a listing of titles, but analyzes each one at length for its detailed contents and value. He concludes that "the book is not recommended as a useful reference work only, to be kept on every student's self, but it should be read from cover to cover for the information it provides as well as for its inspiration."

Liu collaborated with Yu Ying-shih and Robert Irick on a listing and organization of research materials, American-Chinese Relations, 1784-1941: A Survey of Chinese Language Materials at Harvard. and in 1964 his own Americans and Chinese: A Historical Essay and a Bibliography, was published by Harvard University Press. Reviewers praised these volumes

Harvard University Press published his monograph, Anglo-American Steamship Rivalry in China, 1862-1874, in 1962, and he returned to the area of late nineteenth century political reform in several later studies.

In 1981 he organized a conference on orthodoxy and heterodoxy, which resulted in the edited volume, Orthodoxy in Late Imperial China (University of California Press, 1990). In his Introduction to the eleven essays, Liu explains 礼教 lijiao, or "doctrine of propriety-and-ritual", as being "orthodox" or "traditional." (ix) The historian Willard Peterson's expansive review in Harvard Journal of Asiatic Studies pointed out that the "use of the noun 'orthodoxy' suggests there is an entity, something which existed in Ming-Ch'ing society and which historians can describe." Peterson agrees that there "certainly were correct practices and beliefs." But he objects that there was not one, single "orthodoxy," but rather a "process," one that should be a verb, in which emperors, magistrates, lineage elders, teachers, and fathers tried to "correct" others by imposing their authority.

A later volume, edited with Richard Hon-Chun Shek, was Heterodoxy in Late Imperial China (University of Hawai'i Press, 2004).

== Family and personal life ==
In 1960, Liu married Edith Warren, who had degrees in history from Harvard and Columbia. They had two children, Jonathan Warren Liu and Faith Chapin Liu, and three grandchildren.

The historian Philip A. Kuhn in delivering the 2004 Liu Kwang-ching Lecture recalled that Liu "taught by example: integrity in using sources, straightforwardness in writing, and dedication to encouraging students." A colleague in the Davis history department recalled that "He was intensely serious about scholarly research. He regarded parties as a potential seminar with refreshments," however his wife recalled that he loved opera, in particular Gilbert and Sullivan.

== Selected publications ==
=== Bibliographical works ===
- John King Fairbank, Kwang-Ching Liu, Modern China; a Bibliographical Guide to Chinese Works, 1898-1937. (Cambridge,: Harvard University Press, Harvard-Yenching Institute Studies, 1 1950). ISBN Reprint: De Gruyter https://doi.org/10.4159/harvard.9780674866102
- Robert L. Irick, Ying-Shih Yü and Kwang-Ching Liu. American-Chinese Relations, 1784-1941 : A Survey of Chinese Language Materials at Harvard. (Cambridge, MA: Committee on American Far Eastern Policy Studies, Dept. of History, Harvard University, 1960).
- Kwang-Ching Liu. Americans and Chinese: A Historical Essay and a Bibliography. (Cambridge, MA: Harvard University Press, 1963). ISBN 9780674424401. Reprint: De Gruyter https://doi.org/10.4159/harvard.9780674424401.

=== Selected articles, chapters, and lengthy reviews ===
- "German Fear of a Quadruple Alliance, 1904-1905," The Journal of Modern History The Journal of Modern History 18.3 (1946): 222-240.
- "Early Christian Colleges in China," The Journal of Asian Studies 20.1 (1960): 71-78.
- (Review) The Earliest Modern Government Schools in China, by Knight Biggerstaff]. Harvard Journal of Asiatic Studies, 25, 279–284. (1964). https://doi.org/10.2307/2718350
- "The Confucian as Patriot and Pragmatist: Li Hung-Chang's Formative Years, 1823-1866," Harvard journal of Asiatic studies 30.3-4 (1970): 5-45.
- "(Review) John R. Watt, The District Magistrate in Late Imperial China," American Historical Review 80 (1975): 1025-1027. https://www.jstor.org/stable/1867577
- "World View and Peasant Rebellion: Reflections on Post-Mao Historiography," The Journal of Asian studies 40.2 (1981): 295-326.
- with Richard J Smith, "Jung-Pang Lo (1912–1981)," The Journal of Asian Studies 41.2 (1982): 442-442.
- "(Review) Jerry Dennerline, the Chia-Ting Loyalists: Confucian Leadership and Social Change in Seventeenth Century China," Journal of Asian Studies 42 (1982): 130-133.
- "Imperialism and the Chinese Peasants: The Background of the Boxer Uprising (Review of Joseph Esherick, Origins of the Boxer Rebellion," Modern China 15.1 (1989): 102-116. http://www.jstor.org/stable/189133
- Kuo Ting-yee, Liu Kwang-ching. ‘‘Self-strengthening: The pursuit of Western technology.’’ In John King Fairbank, ed. The Cambridge History of China, vol. 10, Late Ch’ing 1800-1911, pt. 1.
- Liu, Kwang-Ching; Smith, Richard J. (1980). "The Military Challenge: The North-west and the Coast". In Fairbank, John K.; Liu, Kwang-Ching (eds.). The Cambridge History of China, Volume 11: Late Ch'ing 1800–1911, Part 2. Cambridge: Cambridge University Press. pp. 202–273. ISBN 978-0-521-22029-3.
- Yung-fa Chen, Guangzhe Pan, eds., China's Early Modernization and Reform Movement: Studies in Late Nineteenth-Century China and American-Chinese Relations (Taipei, Taiwan: Institute of Modern History, Academ Sinica, 2009). Liu's collected articles. V. 1. Historical perspectives --China's early modernization --Li Hung-chang --v. 2. Steamship enterprise: case studies --Western influence and China's reform movement.

=== Monographs ===
- Kwang-Ching Liu. Anglo-American Steamship Rivalry in China, 1862-1874. (Cambridge: Harvard University Press, 1962). ISBN Reprint: De Gruyter 2014 https://doi.org/10.4159/harvard.9780674184886

=== Edited volumes ===
- American Missionaries in China: Papers from Harvard Seminars. (Cambridge, Mass.: East Asian Research Center, Harvard University, 1970).
- with John King Fairbank, The Cambridge History of China. Volume 11, Late Ch'ing, 1800-1911. Part 2 United Kingdom: Cambridge University Press, 1980.
- Orthodoxy in Late Imperial China. (Berkeley: University of California Press, 1990). ISBN 0520065425.
- Chu, Samuel C.; ——, eds. (1994). Li Hung-Chang and China's Early Modernization. Armonk, NY: Sharpe. ISBN 1563242427. Reprinted: Routledge, 2015 https://www.taylorfrancis.com/books/9781315484693
- with Richard Hon-Chun Shek, Heterodoxy in Late Imperial China. (Honolulu: University of Hawai'i Press, 2004). ISBN 0824825381.
