= Rivington School =

American art movement

Rivington School was an art group that emerged from the East Village art scene in the 1980s in New York City. Many of the artists of the Rivington School were involved in welding and forging sculptures, performance art or street art.

The group, that was started in 1983 by early founder "Cowboy" Ray Kelly, named themselves after an abandoned public school house building located on Rivington Street. The school was located near the art clubs No Se No and A's where many artists would meet and where many music and poetry performances were held.

The group is most noted for "massive junk sculpture installations on the Lower East Side," and other forms of metal public sculpture. Also a group of women artists have organized themselves as W.A.R.S. (Women Artists of the Rivington School).

== Sculpture Gardens ==
Many public and guerilla sculpture spaces emerged from the Rivington School, most notably the Rivington Sculpture Garden, originally constructed on Rivington Street near Forsyth Street. Due to the non-permitted nature of the work, the Rivington Sculpture Garden was regularly knocked down by the city. Eventually it found a home at 6th Street, between Avenue B and Avenue C; and the Corragio Studio, more commonly known as "2B" or "The Garage", started by another early founder of the movement, Linus Coraggio. The name "2B" refers to its location at 2nd Street and Avenue B in the East Village of New York City, on which a condominium building now stands. The construction and destruction of the Rivington Sculpture Garden was documented by Monty Cantsin (aka Istvan Kantor) on the super8film ANTI CREDO.

== Early artists ==
Among the early artists of the Rivington School were Cowboy Ray Kelly, Toyo Tsuchiya, Monty Cantsin (aka Istvan Kantor), Arleen Schloss, Shalom Neuman, Paolo Buggiani, Jacek Tylicki, Linus Coraggio, and Ena Paul Kostabi.

== See also ==
- Adam Purple
- ABC No Rio
- A's

== Bibliography ==
- C. Carr, On edge: performance at the end of the twentieth century. ISBN 9780819568885, Wesleyan University Press, 2008
- “Local History: The Battle for Bohemia in the East Village” (with James Cornwell), chapter in Julie Ault, ed., Alternative Art New York, 1965-1985 (University of Minnesota Press, 2002)
- Holland Cotter, “Art in Review: Toyo Tsuchiya, 'Six O'Clock Observed',” New York Times, June 18, 1999.
- New Art Examiner, Volume 17, Chicago, Pennsylvania, and Washington, D.C. New Art Associations, 1989
- Richard Armijo, “Rivington Street Style,” East Informer, no. 2, 1987.
- Margalit Berriet, W.A.R.S. (Women Artists of the Rivington School) De Alors à Aujourd’hui, Mémoire de l’Avenir, ISBN 978-2-494524-19-4
