= Oberlauringen =

- Ortsteil of Stadtlauringen
- Interactive map of Oberlauringen
- Location within Germany Location within Bavaria
- Coordinates: 50°12′58″N 10°22′44″E
- Country: Germany
- State: Bavaria
- Admin. region: Lower Franconia
- District: Schweinfurt
- Municipality: Stadtlauringen
- Elevation: 325 m (1,066 ft)
- Time zone: UTC+01:00 (CET)
  - Summer (DST): UTC+02:00 (CEST)
- Postal codes: 97488
- Dialling codes: 09724

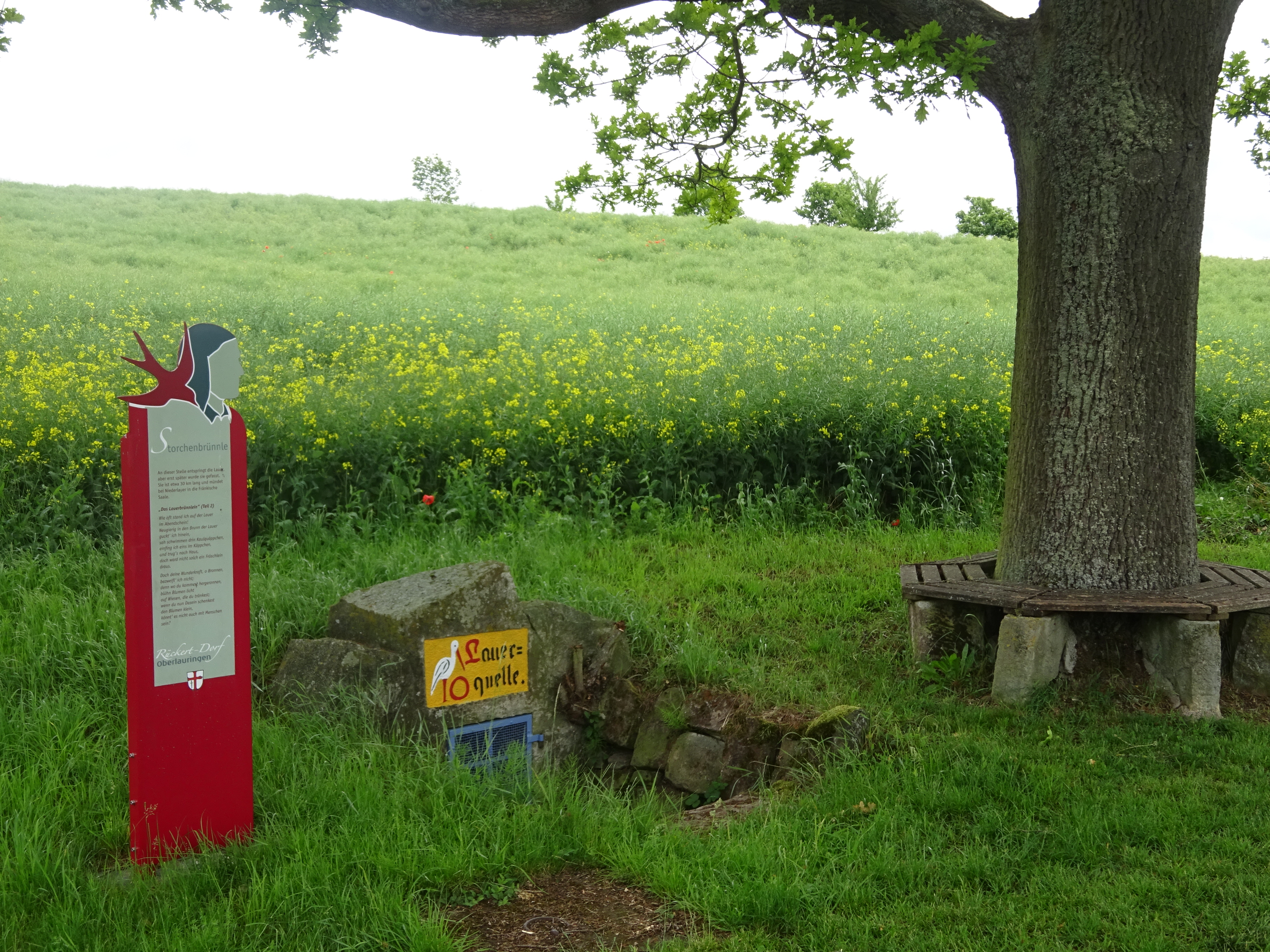
Die Lauerquelle, genannt das "Storchenbrünnle"

Oberlauringen, with 680 inhabitants is part of the municipality Stadtlauringen in the district of Schweinfurt in Lower Franconia, Bavaria, Germany.

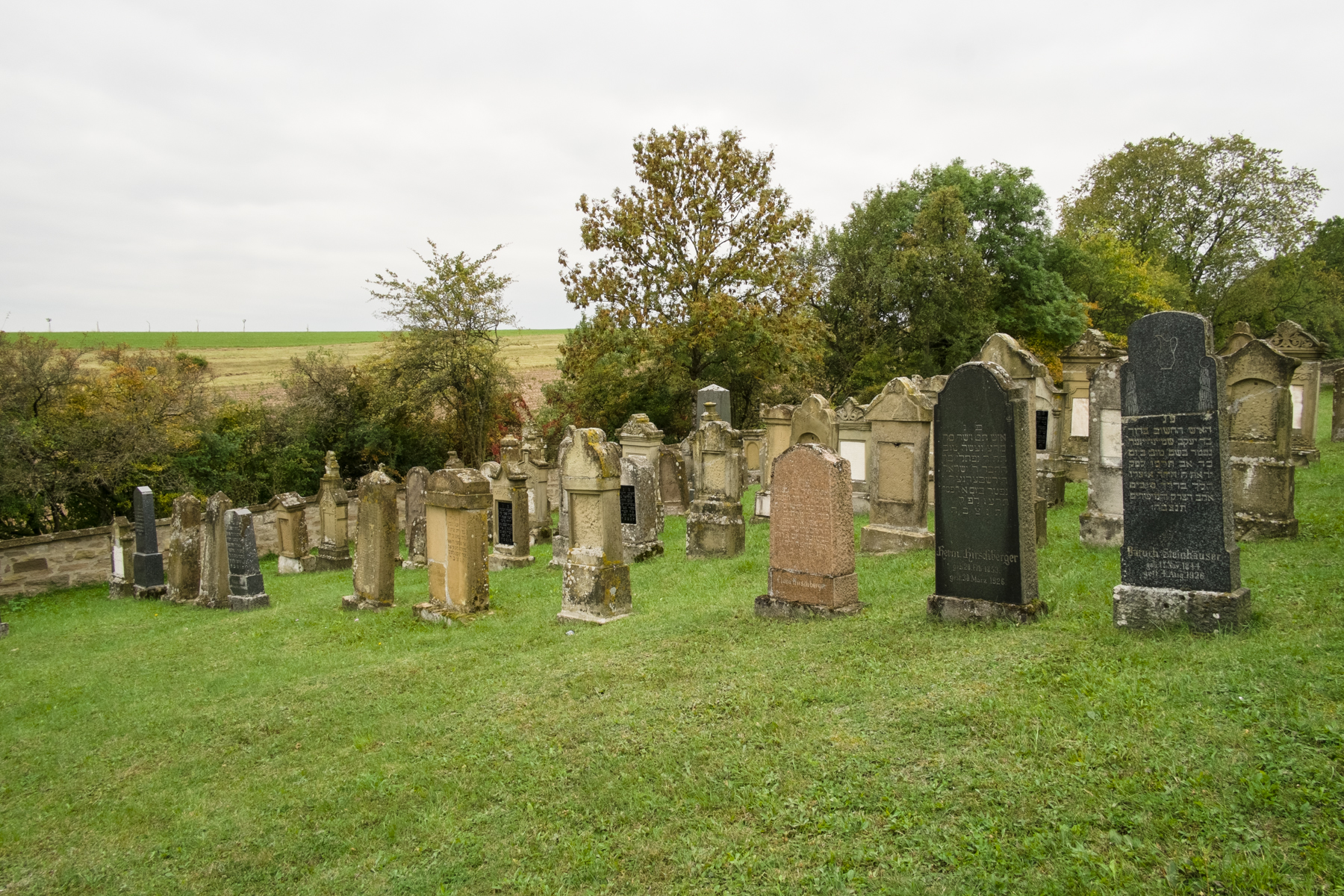
Jüdischer Friedhof

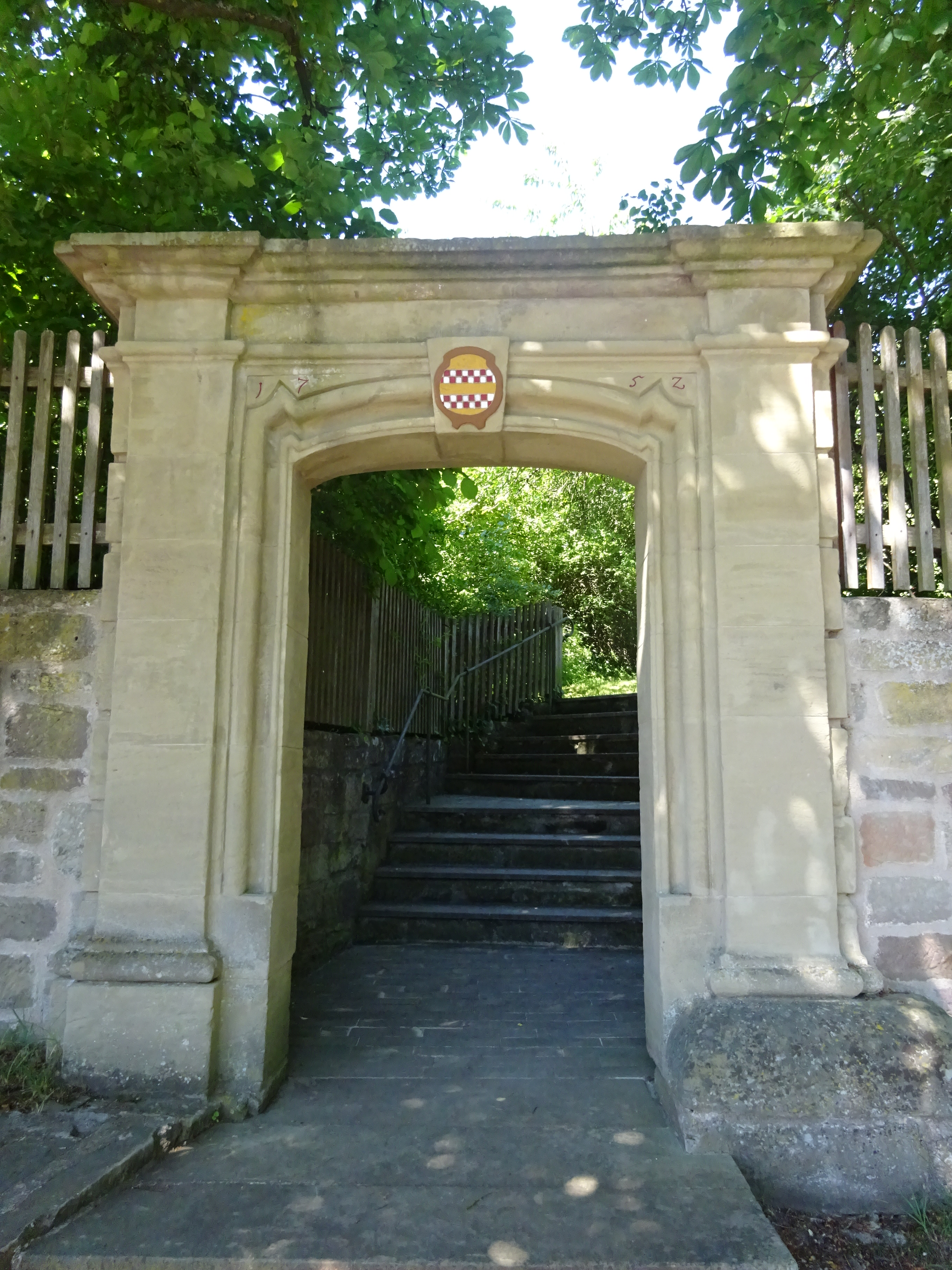
Rückertpforte

== History ==
On May 1, 1978, the previously independent municipality was incorporated into the Stadtlauringen market.
