= Horst Frenz =

German-American literary scholar

- Born: June 29, 1912
- Died: November 17, 1990 (aged 78)

Horst Frenz (June 29, 1912 – November 17, 1990) was a German-American literary scholar and a professor in the Department of Comparative Literature and English at Indiana University. He is known for his works on comparative literature.

== Life ==
Horst Frenz was born on June 29, 1912, in Oberlauringen, Germany. He obtained his Ph.D. in English from the University of Goettingen in 1936 and an MA from University of Illinois in 1939. He began teaching at Indiana University from 1940 since retirement in 1981. He was a founder of the Comparative Literature program at IU and its first chair from 1949 to 1977. Frenz was a president of the American Comparative Literature Association (1971–1974) and a president of the International Comparative Literature Association (1973–1976). He was a recipient of Fulbright, Ford Foundation and Guggenheim fellowships and an editor of the Yearbook of Comparative and General Literature.

== Memorials ==
Horst Frenz Prize is awarded by the American Comparative Literature Association (ACLA).

== Works ==
=== Authored ===
- American Playwrights on Drama New York : Hill and Wang, <1968>.
- Three Plays : The Weavers, Hannele, the Beaver Coat
- Writers of the Western World

=== Edited ===
- (ed) Eugene O'Neill's Critics: Voices from Abroad 'Carbondale : Southern Illinois University Press, 1984.
- Yearbook of Comparative and General Literature
- (editor)Eugene O'Neill (Modern literature monographs)
- (editor) Nobel Lectures Literature 1901-1967 Singapore : World Scientific, 1999.
- (joint ed.)Comparative literature: method & perspective Carbondale & Edwardsville: Southern Illinois University Press
- Indiana University Conference on Oriental Western Literary Relations
