= Toyo Tsuchiya =

Japanese artist and photographer

- Born: Toyo Tsuchiya; 1948; Japan
- Died: 23 November 2017 (aged 68–69)
- Occupation: Artist/Photographer

Toyo Tsuchiya (1948 – 23 November 2017) was a Japanese born artist and photographer and one of the early artists involved in the Rivington School art movement of the East Village art scene of New York City of the 1980s.

Toyo Tsuchiya moved from Japan to New York City in 1980. He was a director of many of the performances and exhibitions at the club No Se No, which was the club that many of the Rivington School artists would meet and perform and show their art work. As a photographer, Tsuchiya was able to document much of the early history of the Rivington School. He was a member of the NO!Art movement.
