= Esther Merle Jackson =

American theatrical historian and director (1922–2006)

- Born: September 3, 1922; Pine Bluff, Arkansas, U.S.
- Died: August 1, 2006 (aged 83); New York City, U.S.
- Occupations: Theater historian; Stage director

Academic background
- Education: Hampton Institute; Ohio State University
- Thesis: The Emergence of a Characteristic Contemporary Form in the American Drama of Tennessee Williams (1958)
- Doctoral advisor: Everett M. Schreck

Academic work
- Discipline: Theater history
- Sub-discipline: Tennessee Williams
- Institutions: Arkansas Agricultural, Mechanical & Normal College; Clark College; University of Wisconsin–Madison

Esther Merle Jackson (September 3, 1922 – August 1, 2006) was an American theatrical historian and director. Born in Pine Bluff, Arkansas, she originally taught at historically black colleges and universities and was one of the first Black women in the United States to get a PhD in Theatre and worked as Director of Education at the New York Shakespeare Festival, before becoming a professor at the University of Wisconsin–Madison Department of Theatre and Drama. She was an expert in the works of Tennessee Williams, writing the book The Broken World of Tennessee Williams in 1965, and she and John Ezell collaborated on several theatrical productions, including a half-hour compilation of plays from Thornton Wilder broadcast on PBS in 1978.

== Biography ==
Esther Merle Jackson was born on September 3, 1922, in Pine Bluff, Arkansas. Her father Napoleon F. Jackson was principal of Booker T. Washington High School, a segregated school in El Dorado, Arkansas, and her mother Ruth (née Atkinson) Jackson taught English at the aforementioned school. After studying at segregated schools in El Dorado, Arkansas, she studied at Hampton Institute, where she got her BS in 1942, and at Ohio State University, where she got her MA in Theatre in 1946.

After teaching at Arkansas Agricultural, Mechanical & Normal College as an instructor in English and Speech (1942–1944), Jackson taught at Hampton Institute (1946–1949) and Clark College (1949–1956) as Assistant Professor of Drama, simultaneously serving as theater director. She received a John Hay Whitney Foundation fellowship in 1956 and an Ohio State University Fellowship in 1957, and she returned to Ohio State to get her PhD in Theatre in 1958, one of the first Black women in the United States to do so; her dissertation, supervised by Everett M. Schreck, was titled The Emergence of a Characteristic Contemporary Form in the American Drama of Tennessee Williams.

Jackson started working in post-secondary education theatrical productions after getting her PhD, and she spent a year working as a Professor of English at North Carolina A&T State University (1958–1959) and as Visiting Professor of Humanities at the Tuskegee Institute (1959–1960). She was a Fulbright Scholar in Drama and Theater Arts at Victoria and Albert Museum during the 1960–1961 academic year.

In 1961, Jackson returned to Clark College as Professor of Speech and Drama and as a chair of their Department of Speech and Drama. From 1964 to 1965, she worked as a specialist in theatre and dance education at the United States Office of Education, where she intended to expand theater's role in the Great Society. After working as Joseph Papp's assistant in 1963, she started working in 1965 as Director of Education at the New York Shakespeare Festival. She later spent short periods teaching at Adelphi University, Shaw University, and the Free University of Berlin, the latter where she was a Fulbright Scholar in Drama and Theater Arts during the 1967–1968 academic year. She published the book The Broken World of Tennessee Williams in 1965. She was elected a Guggenheim Fellow in 1968, for "a study of the drama of ideas in the American theatre, 1909–1966".

In 1969, she became professor at the University of Wisconsin–Madison Department of Theatre and Drama, remaining there until 1987. While at UW Madison, she worked with John Ezell during her efforts to start an institution on American theatre studies and while teaching drama. On August 30, 1978, one of their co-productions, the duo's half-hour compilation of plays from Thornton Wilder titled Wilder Wilder, aired nationwide on PBS.

As an academic, Jackson specialized in theatrical literature, especially the works of Tennessee Williams and Eugene O'Neill. The Reporter described her as a "foremost critic of playwright Tennessee Williams" and a "leading black educator in theater history and criticism". In 1981, she self-published The American Drama and the New World Vision, a manuscript on theater history which, according to Daniel Ciba, "serves as the culmination of Jackson's scholarship [and] connects her scholarship as a through-line that she developed directly through her many years of teaching."

Having suffered from Alzheimer's disease, Jackson died of complications from the disease on August 1, 2006, in Brooklyn, aged 83.

In 2011, her papers were transferred to the Stuart A. Rose Manuscript, Archives, and Rare Book Library; by the time theater professor Daniel Ciba discovered them in 2019 while working on a research project on Jackson, the resulting collection remained unorganized.
