= Glendon A. Schubert =

American political scientist

- Born: June 7, 1918; Oneida, New York, U.S.
- Died: January 15, 2006 (aged 87)
- Other name: Glendon Schubert

Academic background
- Education: Syracuse University

Academic work
- Discipline: Political Scientist
- Sub-discipline: Biopolitics
- Notable ideas: Evolutionary Politics

Glendon A. Schubert (1918 – 2006) was an American author of political science studies and analyses, three-time Fulbright Scholar, and professor of political science, notably serving on the faculties of Syracuse University and the University of Hawaiʻi. Schubert was largely responsible for creating two subdisciplines within political science i.e. judicial behavior and biopolitical behavior. He wrote many books, journals, articles, and musings on these aspects of political science, and is internationally recognized as one of the leading authorities on judicial decision-making behavior. In his own words, his major fields of interest included "Social biological and psychobiological approaches to the study of political theory, methodology, and behavior; political socialization in relation to developmental psychology and psychophysiology; transactional relationships between public policy and the life sciences; political culture, subcultures, and the behavior of political (especially judicial) elites".

== Personal life ==
Schubert was born in Oneida, New York on June 7, 1918. He attended Syracuse University where he received his AB (magna cum laude) in English and Mathematics in 1940 and a PhD in political science in 1948. He served in the United States Army Signal Corps (Intelligence) from 1942 to 1946 as a first lieutenant and was awarded a Bronze Star Medal. Schubert first married Betty Jo Neal, whose marriage produced two sons, both going on to follow in their father's footsteps in the field of political science. James, an accomplished political scientist (teaching at Northern Illinois University) and former executive director of the Association for Politics and the Life Sciences, a group both he and Glendon served as founding members of, also revolutionized the discipline of biopolitics in his own right. Frank A. Schubert, his first son, taught criminal justice at Northeastern University for 25 years and wrote several lines of introductory textbooks. After the death of his first wife, Schubert welcomed 3 daughters with wife Elizabeth Schubert. Later in life, he went on to marry Natalie Klavans.

== Academic career ==
Schubert devoted much research to the phenomena of judicial behavior regarding judges' values, opinions, and attitudes and how it affected their decision-making. This often proved to be a controversial and often-denied position, but in time Schubert established its validity and importance in defining judicial behavior. Realizing that there was a biological basis for all human behavior, Schubert, who had already established himself as an accomplished political scientist, and was an internationally recognized expert on judicial behavior, devoted two years of study to the life sciences with the idea that it would give him greater insights into human behavior. His pursuit began in 1977 at the Zoological Laboratory of the Biological Center of the University of Groningen, Holland, and then from 1978 to 1979 at Wassenaar, Holland at the Netherlands Institute for Advanced Study in Humanities and Social Sciences as a Fulbright-Hays Scholar. After completing his studies in Europe he continued his research and writings in the field of judicial behavior, with increased focus on the life sciences as it affected judicial behavior. Glendon began his career where his higher education sparked, at Syracuse University, as a teaching assistant from 1946 to 1947. From there, he went on to teach as an instructor from 1947 to 1948 and return in 1950. His other teaching and lecturing positions follow:

- University of California, Los Angeles, 1948–49
- Howard University, 1949–50
- Rutgers University, 1950–51
- Franklin & Marshall College, 1951–52
- Michigan State University, 1952-67 tenure
- University of Minnesota, 1955
- University of Oslo, 1959–60
- Stanford University, 1960–61
- University of Hawaiʻi at Mānoa, 1966–67, 1971-2000
- University of North Carolina at Chapel Hill, 1967–68
- York University 1968–70.

=== Works ===
Having written over 200 books, studies, and other works, Dr. Schubert was always "starting one project, finishing two, amidst one, and beginning another", as proved by his Curriculum Vitae. With highly-intellectual political works connecting to principles of psychology, neuroscience, biology, physics, evolution, math, economics, and literature, Schubert's portfolio had a bit of substance for very diverse audiences. Some of his most referenced studies include:

- "The Public Interest" In Administrative Decision-Making: Theorem, Theosophy, or Theory? (1957) – JSTOR 1952196
- The Presidency in the courts (1957)
- The Theory of "The Public Interest" in Judicial Decision-Making (1958) – JSTOR 2109163
- The Study of Judicial Decision-Making as an Aspect of Political Behavior (1958) – JSTOR 1951981
- Quantitative Analysis of Judicial Behavior (1959)
- Constitutional Politics: The Political Behavior of Supreme Court Justices and the Constitutional Policies That They Make (1960)
- The 1960 Term of the Supreme Court: A Psychological Analysis (1965) – JSTOR 1953099
- Judicial Decision-Making (1963)
- Measuring Malapportionment (1964) – JSTOR 1952864
- Judicial Policy-Making (1965)
- Jackson's Judicial Philosophy: An Exploration in Value Analysis (1965) – JSTOR 1953215
- The judicial mind : the attitudes and ideologies of Supreme Court justices, 1946-1963 (1965)
- Reapportionment (1965)
- Behavioral Jurisprudence (1968) – JSTOR 3052896
- Comparative judicial behavior; cross-cultural studies of political decision-making in the East and West - coauthored (1969)
- The Judicial Mind: The Attitudes and Ideologies of Supreme Court Justices (1965)
- The constitutional polity (1970)
- The Judicial Mind Reappraised (1975) – JSTOR 29761498
- Political Attitudes and Ideologies: A Cross-Cultural Interdisciplinary Approach (1977)
- Comparative Judicial Study (1981)
- Politics as a Life Science (1982)
- Politics and the Evolution of Inquiry in Political Science - coauthored (1982) – JSTOR 4235292
- The Evolution of Political Science: Paradigms of Physics, Biology, and Politics (1983) – JSTOR 4235317
- Political Culture and Judicial Behavior, in two volumes (1985).
- Evolutionary politics (1989)
- Sexual politics and political feminism (1991)

Schubert was awarded the Lifetime Career Achievement Award in 1994 from the Association for Politics and the Life Sciences. He was considered to be the most creative and influential political scientist of the mid-20th century. He died on January 15, 2006, in Seattle, Washington.

== Sources ==
- Johnson, Gary R. (Fall 2011). "Politics and the life sciences: An unfinished revolution". Politics and the Life Sciences. 30 (2). Cambridge University Press: 43–64. doi:10.2990/30_2_43. JSTOR 23359799. PMID 22702424. S2CID 25359320.
- Rogers, Lindsay (February 1961). "Reviewed Work: Quantitative Analysis of Judicial Behavior by Glendon A. Schubert". Columbia Law Review. 61 (2). Columbia Law Review. Columbia Law Review Association, Inc.: 308–311. doi:10.2307/1120076. hdl:2027/mdp.39015001543845. JSTOR 1120076.
- "UH Mānoa mourns passing of retired political science professor Glendon Schubert". University of Hawaiʻi.
