= David Yalof =

American academic

David Alistair Yalof is a political scientist and university administrator. He is currently the Senior Vice Provost for Academic Affairs and Professor of Government at William & Mary. He formerly served as professor and department head of the political science department at the University of Connecticut, where he specialized in constitutional law, judicial politics and executive branch politics. His books include Pursuit of Justices (1999), which NBC News called "the definitive book on post-World War II Supreme Court nominees".

== Books ==
- 1999: Pursuit of Justices: Presidential Politics and the Selection of Supreme Court Nominees, (Chicago: University of Chicago Press, 1999) (ISBN 0-226-94545-6). The book was the winner of the APSA's Richard E. Neustadt Prize for the Best Book on the Presidency published in 1999.
- 2002: The First Amendment and the Media in the Court of Public Opinion with Kenneth Dautrich (Cambridge: Cambridge University Press, 2002) (ISBN 0-521-01181-7)
- 2007: Constitutional Law: Civil Liberty and Individual Rights, 6th Edition with William Cohen and David Danelski (St. Paul, Minn.: West, 2007) (ISBN 978-1-59941-170-5)
- 2008: The Future of the First Amendment: The Digital Media, Civic Education and Free Expression Rights in America's High Schools with Kenneth Dautrich and Mark Hugo Lopez (Rowman & Littlefield, 2008) (ISBN 0-742-56282-4)
- 2012: Prosecution Among Friends: Presidents, Attorneys General, and Executive Branch Wrongdoing (College Station, Tex.: Texas A&M University Press, 2012).
- 2017: Enduring Democracy: An Introduction to American Government with Kenneth Dautrich and Christina Bejarano (Belmont, Cal.: Cengage, 2008, 2009, 2011, 2013, 2015, 2017) (ISBN 978-1-285-85304-8)
- 2023: George Washington and the Two-Term Precedent (Lawrence, KS: University Press of Kansas, 2023)
