= Stadtlauringen =

- Municipality
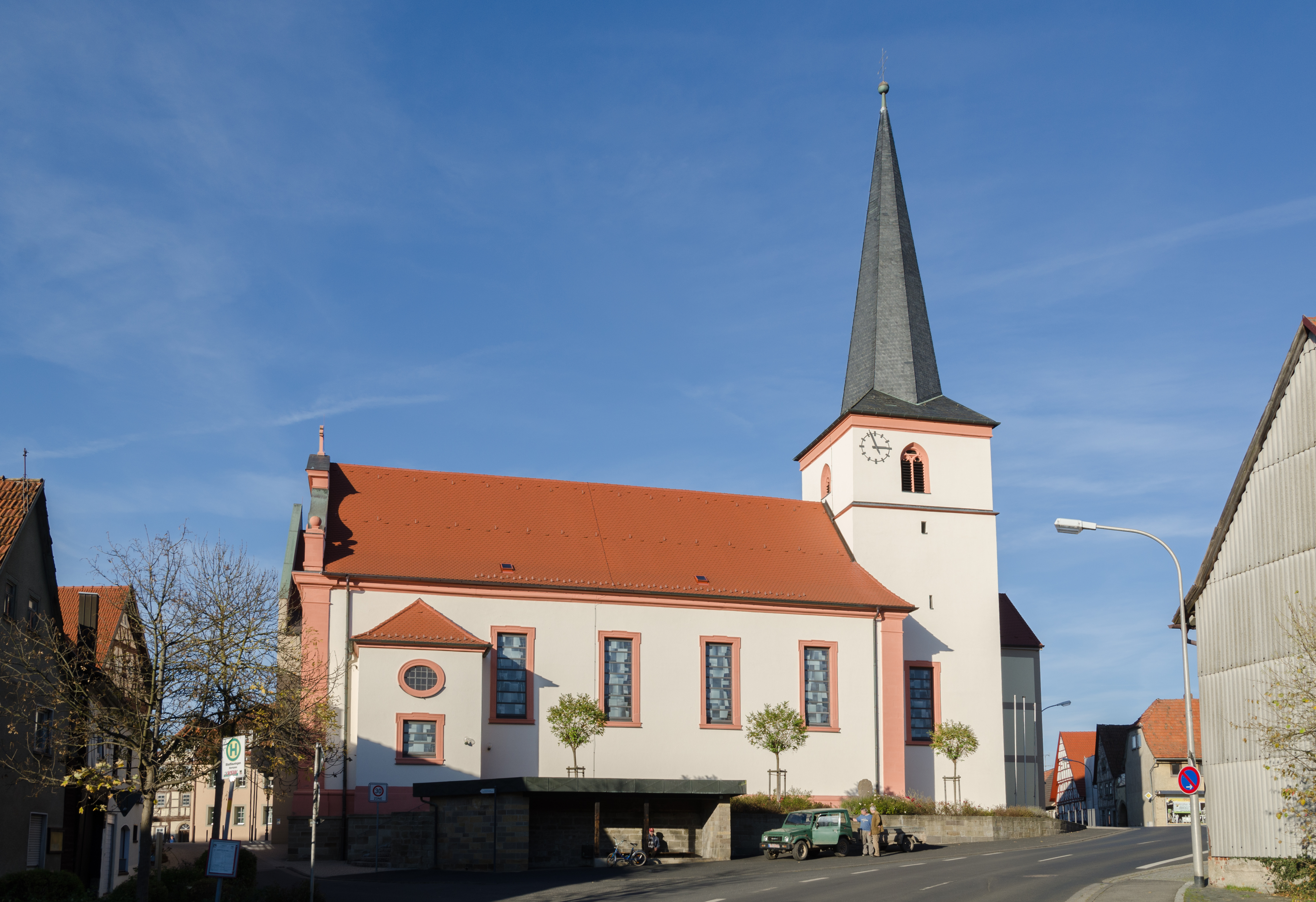
- Church of Saint John the Baptist

- Coat of arms

- Location of Stadtlauringen within Schweinfurt district
- Interactive map of Stadtlauringen
- Location within Germany Location within Bavaria
- Coordinates: 50°11′17″N 10°21′34″E
- Country: Germany
- State: Bavaria
- Admin. region: Unterfranken
- District: Schweinfurt
- Subdivisions: 10 Ortsteile

Government
  - Mayor (2020–26): Friedel Heckenlauer (CSU)

Area
  - Total: 63.62 km^{2} (24.56 sq mi)
- Elevation: 290 m (950 ft)

Population (2025-12-31)
  - Total: 4,145
  - Density: 65.15/km^{2} (168.7/sq mi)
- Time zone: UTC+01:00 (CET)
  - Summer (DST): UTC+02:00 (CEST)
- Postal codes: 97488
- Dialling codes: 09724
- Vehicle registration: SW
- Website: www.stadtlauringen.de

Stadtlauringen is a municipality in the district of Schweinfurt in Bavaria, Germany.

== Geography ==
=== Location ===
Stadtlauringen is in the Main Rhön region, circa 20 kilometers north east of Schweinfurt. It is the northernmost municipality in the district of Schweinfurt. The Lauer flows through it. The Ellertshäuser See is close to the village Altenmünster.

=== Towns and Villages ===
The municipality Stadtlauringen consists of the following towns and villages:

- Altenmünster with Ellertshausen and Reinhardshausen
- Ballingshausen
- Birnfeld
- Fuchsstadt
- Mailes
- Oberlauringen
- Stadtlauringen
- Sulzdorf
- Wettringen
- Wetzhausen

== History ==
In 794 A.D. it was first documented as Lauringen, then later as Niederlauringen. In 1484 it received municipality and city rights, and was also renamed to Stadtlauringen. In 1818 city rights were abandoned, but municipality rights were kept.

The coat of arms originates from the time when city rights were acquired.

== Politics ==
=== Mayor ===
Mayor is Friedel Heckenlauer (CSU), in office since 2002.

== Sources ==
- Reinhold W. F. Heusinger: Markt Stadtlauringen. Beiträge zur Heimatgeschichte. Markt Stadtlauringen, Stadtlauringen 1994. (in German)
