= Eric Berry Edney =

English-born zoologist

Eric Berry Edney (1913–2000) was an English-born zoologist.

Edney was born in Bognor Regis, and moved to Rhodesia with his family as a child. He attended boarding school and a college in Bulawayo. Edney earned a bachelor's of science from Rhodes University College in 1933. He returned to England for his graduate studies and was awarded a Diploma of Imperial College and Ph.D. at the University of London in 1936.

Edney worked for the National Museum of Southern Rhodesia until 1940, when he accepted a post as biology lecturer at Makerere College. During World War II, he served in the Uganda Defense Forces. From 1946 to 1955, he served concurrently as lecturer in zoology and reader in entomology at the University of Birmingham, while also earning his D.Sc. from the same institution. Between 1955 and 1965, Edney taught at the University College of Rhodesia and Nyasaland as the founding leader of the department of zoology. He subsequently moved to the United States, teaching at the University of California, Riverside until 1972, and at the University of California, Los Angeles until 1979.

In retirement, Edney moved to Vancouver and assumed an honorary position at University of British Columbia. A diagnosis of macular degeneration ended his research career. Over the course of his career, Edney was awarded a Guggenheim Fellowship in 1968, and elected a fellow of the Royal Entomological Society, the Institute of Biology, and the American Association for the Advancement of Science. Edney died in Vancouver on 28 May 2000, aged 86.
