= Linus Coraggio =

American street artist (born 1957)

Linus Coragggio (born 1962) is an American street artist, sculptor, and an early founding member of the Rivington School. For many years Coraggio ran a renowned art-space gallery, nightclub, de-facto community center and personal art studio on Avenue B and 2nd street called the "Gas Station" in an old 3-bay gas station in the Manhattan neighborhood of Alphabet City on the Lower East Side. The "Gas Station" closed in 1995 which garnered extensive coverage in the Village Voice, New York Times, Time Out magazine and art news..

Coraaggio is a 1984 graduate of SUNY Purchase and subsequently of Whitney Studio Program where he dropped out after 6 months due to what he termed as the "stifling, pretentious and boring academic atmosphere". Also he was concurrently founding his own art movement called the "Rivington School" which was a renegade collective of Artists that took over 3 empty city-owned lots on the Lower East Side from 1985 to 1998 and welded sprawling massive morasses of found metal into wild public sculpture gardens where performance art, welding workshops, punk rock events and general mayhem could thrive.

In 2019 Coraggio's work was the subject of a solo exhibition, titled "Ramifications" at the Howl Arts Center in New York City. Corragio's work was also included in the exhibition "1970S Graffiti Today" curated by Arnold Lehman the former durector of the Brooklyn Museum at Phillips Auction House in New York City alongside that of Al Diaz, Futura 2000, Fred Braithwraite, Lee Quinones, and Lady Pink and then again at Phillips in 2023 in the exhibition "Never Above 14th Street" curated by Kurt Boone and alongside such artists as Mike Bidlo, Keith Haring, David Wojnarowicz, Martin Wong, and David McDermott and Peter McGough.
