= Ransom L. Baldwin =

Animal research scientist

Ransom Leland "Lee" Baldwin V (21 September 1935 – 30 November 2007) was an animal research scientist and a member of the National Academy of Sciences as of 1993. He was born on a dairy farm in Meriden, Connecticut. He earned a BS in Animal Industries from the University of Connecticut in 1957. He received an MS in Dairy Nutrition and a PhD in Biochemistry and Nutrition in 1963 from Michigan State University. From 1957 to 1961 he was a National Science Foundation Fellow. In 1968, he was awarded the Guggenheim Fellowship in Natural Sciences. He taught in the Animal Science Department at the University of California, Davis from 1963 until he retired in 2001. He was married to Mary Ellen, who he met in 1953.
