= John D. Rosenberg =

American scholar of Victorian literature (1929–2019)

John D. Rosenberg (April 17, 1929 – 2019) was an American scholar of Victorian literature. He was William Peterfield Trent Professor of English at Columbia University.

== Biography ==
Rosenberg was born in New York City on April 17, 1929, and attended Columbia College, where he worked as Lionel Trilling's research assistant during his senior year, serving as a courier between Trilling and Jacques Barzun in Hamilton Hall. He graduated from Columbia in 1951 and was elected to Phi Beta Kappa and the Philolexian Society.

Rosenberg then won a Kellett Fellowship to Clare College, Cambridge, where he read English, and returned to Columbia for his Ph.D. in English. He was influenced by Jerome Hamilton Buckley and specialized in Victorian literature, completing his thesis on John Ruskin in 1960 that was promptly published by Columbia University Press as The Darkening Glass: a Portrait of Ruskin's Genius (1961).

He taught at the City College of New York and was appointed an assistant professor at Columbia in 1962 before becoming a full professor in 1967.

He received a Guggenheim Fellowship in 1968. Rosenberg died in 2019 at age 90.
