= Peter Heintz =

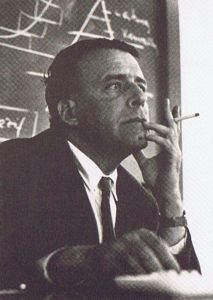
Heintz attending a seminar (1960s)

Peter René Heintz (November 6, 1920 – March 15, 1983) was a Swiss professor of sociology and doctor of political science that notably impacted on the extensive academic development within Latin America and greater Europe.

== Life ==
Heintz was born on November 6, 1920, as the son of a merchant in Davos, Switzerland. After many years of adolescence in Spain and scientific studies in Paris, Cologne and Zurich, Heintz obtained his doctorate of Political Science in 1943 from the University of Zurich. While on campus, a chance encounter with German-born sociologist René König was particularly important for his interest in sociology, leading him to assist König in Cologne and later habilitate renowned theses such as The Problem of Authority with P.J. Proudhon (1956). Alongside Erwin Scheuch and Dietrich Rüschemeyer, Heintz was one of König’s major students.

Beginning in 1956 he participated as an expert for the UNESCO, within the field of academic development of sociology in Latin America. During 1957, Peter collaborated for the first time with his wife Suzanne Heintz to release the paper Sociology of Juvenile Delinquency. From 1960 to 1965 under a Latin America UNESCO initiative, Heintz headed the Escuela Latinoamericana de Sociología at FLACSO (Facultad Latinoamericana de Ciencias Sociales) in Santiago de Chile while collaborating with such internationally known sociologists by the likes of Alain Touraine, Shmuel Noah Eisenstadt and Johan Galtung.

Subsequently, Heintz founded the Department of Sociology at the newly constructed Fundación Bariloche(Bariloche Foundation), Argentina.

In 1966 Heintz was appointed Professor of Sociology and associated accolade of ordinarius at the University of Zurich. Upon his arrival to the position of professor, together with Erich Häuselmann, he founded the Sociological Institute on the campus.

From 1969 until 1972, he presided the Swiss Sociological Association, and furthermore contributed greatly to the institutionalization of theoretically informed and empirically based sociology in Switzerland.

Heintz remained as an ordinarius professor at the University of Zurich until his death during 1983 while living in Zurich.

== Work ==
Early focuses of Heintz' work were contributions to the theories of anarchism, authority, protest and also the sociological analysis of the rise of fascism in Europe.

Heintz' primary life work aimed at developing an alternative to modernization theory, one that was oriented towards social-structural and power analysis within the framework of a general theory of societal systems. This involved him conceptualizing "modernization" or "development" as countries' attempted upward mobility in the international stratification system around development. From a model analysis, he concluded as early as 1974 that the planned enlargements of the then unified Europe would increase its structural heterogeneity; beyond the point of emergence of fundamental sociopolitical tensions. Heintz acted as a forerunner in other aspects of worldwide change, ranging from his analysis of the theory of the world system through to analysing the rise of a power contest between the international system of nation-states, the network of multinational corporations and the cultural codes used to apprehend these changes.

As a final act of contribution to worldwide academia, Heintz established the World Society Foundation, headquartered in Zurich, in 1982 with the aim of supporting research on world society.

Heintz' professional bequest is currently archived inside of the Swiss Social Archives in Zurich, Switzerland.

== Publications ==
Peter Heintz' principal published monographs throughout his career consist of the following:

- Anarchism and the present (Anarchismus und Gegenwart) 1951, 1985
- The problem of authority with Proudhon (Die Autoritätsproblematik bei Proudhon) 1956
- Sociology course (Curso de sociología) 1956, 1960, 1965
- Social prejudices: a problem of personality, culture and society (Soziale Vorurteile : ein Problem der Persönlichkeit, der Kultur und der Gesellschaft) 1957
- Methodology of teaching and research in social sciences (Metodologia de la ensenanza y de la investigacion en las sciencias sociales) 1960
- Sociology of Developing Countries (Soziologie der Entwicklungsländer) 1962
- Introduction to sociological theory (Einführung in die soziologische Theorie) 1962
- A sociological paradigm of development with special consideration of Latin America (Ein soziologisches Paradigma der Entwicklung mit besonderer Berücksichtigung Lateinamerikas) 1969
- A Macrosociological Theory of Societal Systems (A Macrosociological Theory of Societal Systems) 1972
- The Future of Development (Die Zukunft der Entwicklung) 1973
- The world society in the mirror of events (Die Weltgesellschaft im Spiegel von Ereignissen) 1982
- Unequal distribution, power and legitimacy (Ungleiche Verteilung, Macht und Legitimität) 1982

== Books in his honour ==
- Guido Hischier, René Levy, Werner Obrecht (Hrsg.): Weltgesellschaft und Sozialstruktur. Festschrift zum 60. Geburtstag von Peter Heintz. Verlag Rüegger, Diessenhofen 1980, ISBN 3-7253-0123-9
