= Bliss (name) =

Bliss is a name, most usually a surname. Notable people with the name include:

== Given name ==
- Bliss Ackuaku (born 1918), Ghanaian politician
- Bliss Botsford (1813–1890), Canadian lawyer, judge and politician
- Bliss Blood, American musician and songwriter
- Kirby Bliss Blanton (born 1990), American actress
- Bliss Carman (1861–1929), Canadian poet
- Bliss N. Davis (1801–1885), American politician
- Bliss Knapp (1877–1958), American Christian Science teacher
- Bliss Milford (1886–1970), American actress and singer
- Bliss Perry (1860–1954), American literacy critic, writer, editor, and teacher
- Franklyn Bliss Snyder (1884–1958), American educator and academic

== Surname ==
=== Academics ===
- Anna Bliss (1843–1925), American teacher in South Africa
- Charles K. Bliss (1897–1985), inventor of Blissymbols
- Daniel Bliss (1823–1916), American founder of the American University of Beirut
- Henry E. Bliss (1870–1955), American librarian and inventor of the Bliss classification
- Michael Bliss (1941–2017), Canadian historian and award-winning author
- Philip Bliss (academic) (1787–1857), Registrar of the University of Oxford, etc.
- William Henry Bliss (1835–1911), English scholar

=== Athletes ===
- Alexa Bliss (born 1991), ring name of American professional wrestler Alexis Kaufman
- Brian Bliss (born 1965), American soccer defender and coach
- C. D. Bliss (1870–1948), American football player and coach
- Dave Bliss (born 1943), American college basketball coach
- Elmer Bliss (1875–1962), American baseball player
- Frank Bliss (1852–1929), American baseball player
- Homer Bliss (1904–1970), American football player
- Jack Bliss (1882–1968), American baseball player
- Johnny Bliss (1922–1974), Australian rugby league footballer
- Karen Bliss (born 1963), American cyclist
- Laurie Bliss (1872–1942), American football player and coach in the United States
- Mike Bliss (born 1965), American NASCAR driver
- Ryan Bliss (born 1999), American baseball player

=== Entertainers and artists ===
- Arthur Bliss (1891–1975), British composer
- Boti Bliss (born 1975), American actress
- Caroline Bliss (born 1961), British actress
- Diana Bliss (1954–2012), Australian theatre producer
- Douglas Bliss (1900–1984), Scottish painter
- Harry Bliss (born 1964), American cartoonist
- Ian Bliss (born 1966), Australian actor
- John Bliss (1930–2008), American actor
- Lillie P. Bliss (1864–1931), American art collector and patron, founder of Metropolitan Museum of Art
- Lucille Bliss (1916–2012), American actress and voice artist
- Philip Bliss (1838–1876), American hymn lyricist and composer
- Sister Bliss (born 1970), British keyboardist, record producer, DJ, composer and songwriter
- Thomas Bliss (born 1952), American motion picture producer and executive producer
- Trinity Bliss (born 2009), American actress

=== Politicians and jurists ===
- Aaron T. Bliss (1837–1906), U.S. Representative and Governor of Michigan
- Charles Frederick Bliss (1817–1894), German American politician in Wisconsin
- Cornelius Newton Bliss (1833–1911), American merchant and politician
- John Murray Bliss (1771–1834), Associate Justice of the Supreme Court of New Brunswick, Canada
- Justice Bliss (disambiguation)
- Philemon Bliss (1813–1889), U.S. Congressman and jurist
- Ray C. Bliss (1907–1981), American politician
- Stephen Bliss (1787–1847), American minister and politician
- Ward R. Bliss (1855–1905), Pennsylvania state representative
- William L. Bliss (1876–1969), Associate Justice of the Iowa Supreme Court

=== Scientists, engineers, and doctors ===
- A. J. Bliss (1862–1931), British iris breeder
- Chester Ittner Bliss (1899–1979), biologist known for his contributions to statistics
- Doctor Willard Bliss (1825–1889), American physician
- Dorothy Bliss (1916–1987), American carcinologist
- Eleanor Albert Bliss (1899–1987), American bacteriologist
- Frederick J. Bliss (1857–1939), American archaeologist
- Gilbert Ames Bliss (1876–1951), American mathematician
- Nathaniel Bliss (1700–1764), English astronomer
- Richard L. Bliss, American telecommunications technician arrested in Russia on charges of espionage in 1997
- Timothy Vivian Pelham Bliss (born 1940), British neuroscientist

=== Other ===
- Baron Bliss (1869–1926), British philanthropist in British Honduras
- Duane Leroy Bliss (1835–1910), American industrialist
- Ed Bliss (1912–2002), American journalist
- Edward Bliss (1865–1960), American missionary to China
- George Bliss (disambiguation), multiple people
- Harriet Bliss Ford (1876–1964), American writer, editor, clubwoman
- Henry H. Bliss (1830–1899), American real estate dealer, first person killed in a motor vehicle accident in the U.S.
- Stephen M. Bliss (born 1944), American general and educational administrator
- Sylvester Bliss (1814–1863), Millerite minister and editor
- Tasker H. Bliss (1853–1930), U.S. Army officer
- William Dwight Porter Bliss (1856–1926), American religious leader and activist
- William Wallace Smith Bliss (1815–1853), U.S. Army Officer
- Zenas Bliss (1835–1900), U.S. Army General and Medal of Honor recipient

== See also ==
- Bliss (disambiguation)
