= General Bliss =

General Bliss may refer to:

- Stephen M. Bliss (born 1944), U.S. Army brigadier general
- Tasker H. Bliss (1853–1930), U.S. Army general
- Zenas Bliss (1835–1900), Union Army major general
