= Rickshaw =

Two- or three-wheeled passenger cart

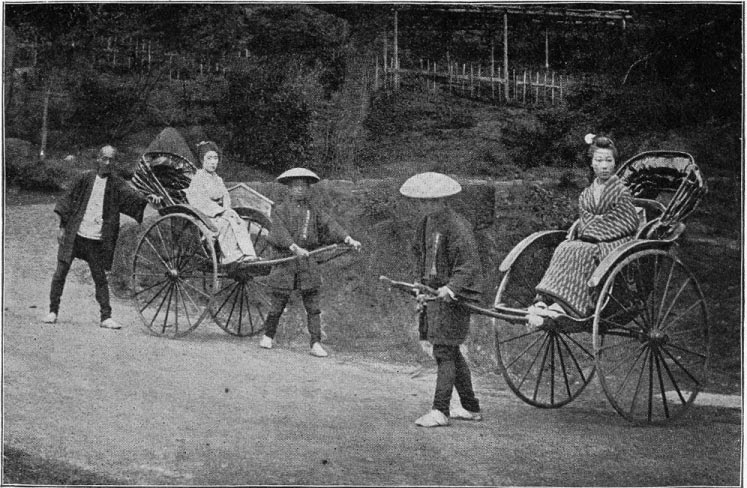
Pulled rickshaws in Japan (c. 1897)

A rickshaw, originally denoted a pulled rickshaw, is a two- or three-wheeled cart generally pulled by one person and carrying one passenger. The first known use of the term in English was in 1879. Over time, cycle rickshaws (also known as pedicabs or trishaws), auto rickshaws, and electric rickshaws were invented, and have replaced the original pulled rickshaws, with a few exceptions for their use in tourism.

Pulled rickshaws created a popular form of transportation and a source of employment for male labourers within Asian cities in the 19th century. Their appearance was related to newly acquired knowledge of ball-bearing systems. Their popularity declined as cars, trains, and other forms of transportation became widely available.

Auto rickshaws are becoming more popular in some cities in the 21st century as an alternative to taxis because of their low cost of hire. Bangladesh holds the record of hosting highest number of rickshaws in the world with 40,000 rickshaws operating in the capital Dhaka alone every day. In 2023, UNESCO listed rickshaws and rickshaw art as 'intangible heritage' of Bangladesh.

== Name ==
Rickshaw originates from the Japanese word jinrikisha (人力車, 人 jin = human, 力 riki = power or force, 車 sha = vehicle, from Chinese rénlìchē), which literally means "human-powered vehicle".

== History ==
=== Origin ===
The first rickshaws were invented in France in the late 17th century, to fulfill, along with other types of carriages such as cabriolets and fiacres, the unmet demand for public transportation created by the 1679 cessation of Paris' first horse-drawn omnibus service. These vehicles, called "vinaigrettes" for their resemblance to the handcarts used by contemporary vinegar-sellers, were fully-enclosed two-wheeled carriages with space for a single person. Usually, they were moved by two people; one holding the bars at the front and the other pushing from behind.

A drawing by Claude Gillot named La scène des deux carrosses, from c. 1712-16, shows two rickshaws.

Rickshaws were independently invented in Japan circa 1869, after the lifting of a ban on wheeled vehicles from the Tokugawa period (1603–1868), and at the beginning of a period of rapid technical advancement in Japan.

==== Inventor ====
There are many theories about the inventor, with the most likely and widely accepted theory describing the rickshaw as having been invented in Japan in 1869, by Izumi Yosuke, who formed a partnership with Suzuki Tokujiro and Takayama Kosuke to build the vehicles, having been "inspired by the horse carriages that had been introduced to the streets of Tokyo a few years earlier".

Other theories about the inventor of the rickshaw include:

- Reverend Jonathan Goble (sometimes called Jonathan Scobie), an American Free Baptist minister and missionary to Japan, is said to have invented the rickshaw around 1869 to transport his invalid wife through the streets of Yokohama.
- An American blacksmith named Albert Tolman is said to have invented the rickshaw, or "man drawn lorry" in 1846 in Worcester, Massachusetts, for a South American bound missionary.
- In New Jersey, the Burlington County Historical Society claims an 1867 invention by carriage maker James Birch, and exhibits a Birch rickshaw in its museum.

Japan historian Seidensticker wrote of the theories:

Though the origins of the rickshaw are not entirely clear, they seem to be Japanese, and of Tokyo specifically. The most widely accepted theory offers the name of three inventors, and gives 1869 as the date of invention.

=== Description ===
The vehicle had a wooden carriage that rode on "superior Western wheels" and was a dramatic improvement over earlier modes of transportation. Whereas the earlier sedan chairs required two people, the rickshaw generally only required one. More than one person was required for hilly or mountainous areas. It also provided a smoother ride for the passenger. Other forms of vehicles at the time were drawn by animals or were wheelbarrows. The vehicle also has a collapsible hood for protection from sun or rain.

The Powerhouse Museum in Sydney, has had a rickshaw in its collection for over 120 years. It was made about 1880 and is described as:

A rickshaw, or jinrikisha, is a light, two-wheeled cart consisting of a doorless, chairlike body, mounted on springs with a collapsible hood and two shafts. Finished in black lacquer-ware over timber, it was drawn by a single rickshaw runner.

=== Late 19th century ===
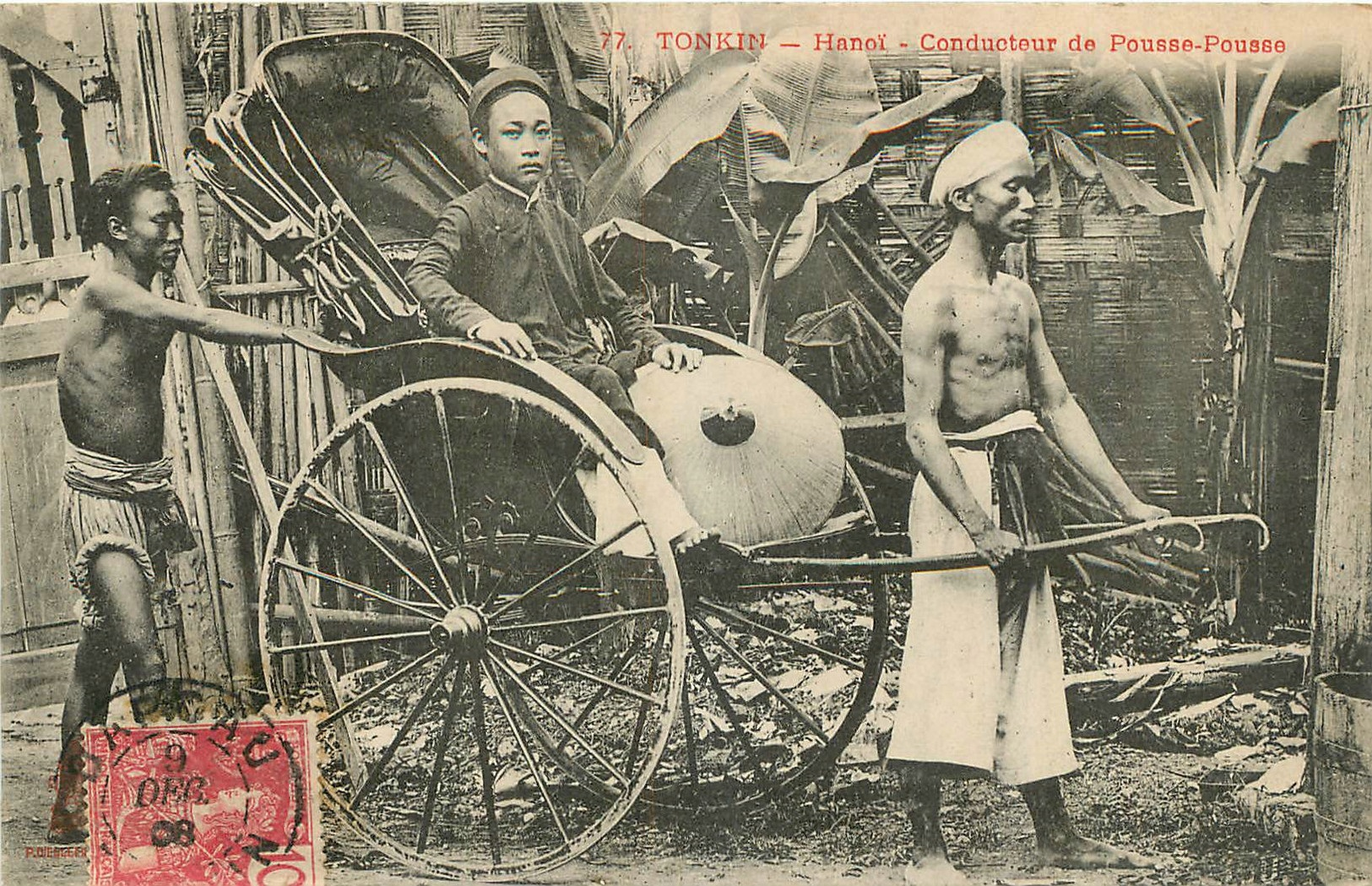
Early 20th-century rickshaw in Hanoi.

In the Late 19th century, hand-pulled rickshaws became an inexpensive, popular mode of transportation across Asia. Peasants who migrated to large Asian cities often worked first as a rickshaw runner. It was "the deadliest occupation in the East, [and] the most degrading for human beings to pursue." (Note: In China, coolies performed rickshaw pulling. Other hard or demeaning jobs included being night soil cleaners and dock workers.)

==== Japan ====
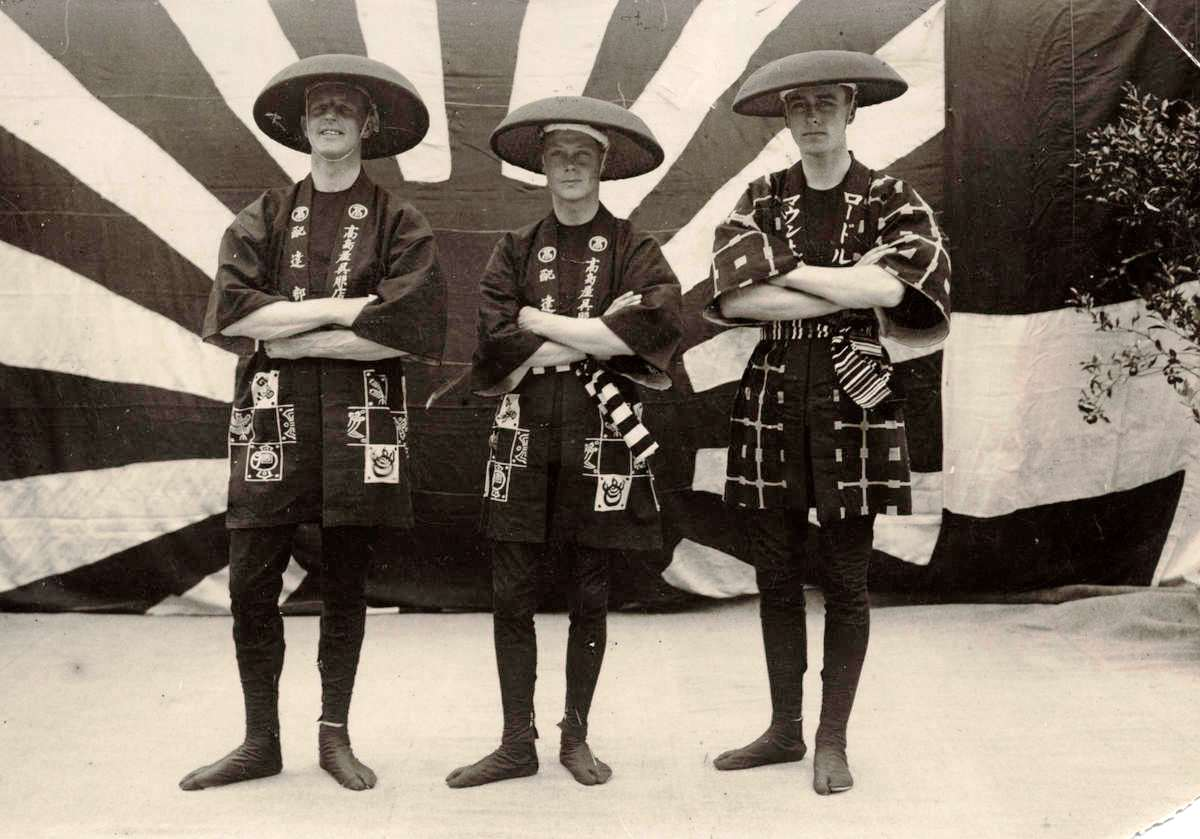
Edward, Prince of Wales, and his staff disguised as rickshaw men during his visit to Japan in 1922. He bought the clothes himself in Kyoto.

Starting in 1870, the Tokyo government issued a permit to build and sell 人力車 (jinrikisha: rickshaw in Japanese) to the trio that are believed in Asia to be the rickshaw's inventors: Izumi Yosuke, Takayama Kosuke, and Suzuki Tokujiro. In order to operate a rickshaw in Tokyo, a seal was required from these men. By 1872, they replaced the kago and norimono, becoming the main mode of transportation in Japan, with about 40,000 rickshaws in service. At that time man-power was much cheaper than horse-power; horses were generally only used by the military. Some of the rickshaws were artistically decorated with paintings and rear elevations. In this time, the more exuberant styles of decorations were banned. If the families were well-off financially they might have their own rickshaw runner. Generally, runners covered 30 to 50 kilometres (20–30 mi) in a day, at an average traveling speed of 8 km/h (5 mph).

Japanese rickshaw manufacturers produced and exported rickshaws to Asian countries and South Africa.

==== Singapore ====
Singapore received its first rickshaws in 1880 and soon after they were prolific, making a "noticeable change in the traffic on Singapore's streets." Bullock carts and gharries were used before rickshaws were introduced.

Many of the poorest individuals in Singapore in the late nineteenth century were poverty-stricken, unskilled people of Chinese ancestry. Sometimes called coolies, the hardworking men found that pulling a rickshaw was a new opportunity for employment.

In 1897, martial law was declared to end a four-day rickshaw workers' strike.

==== Other ====
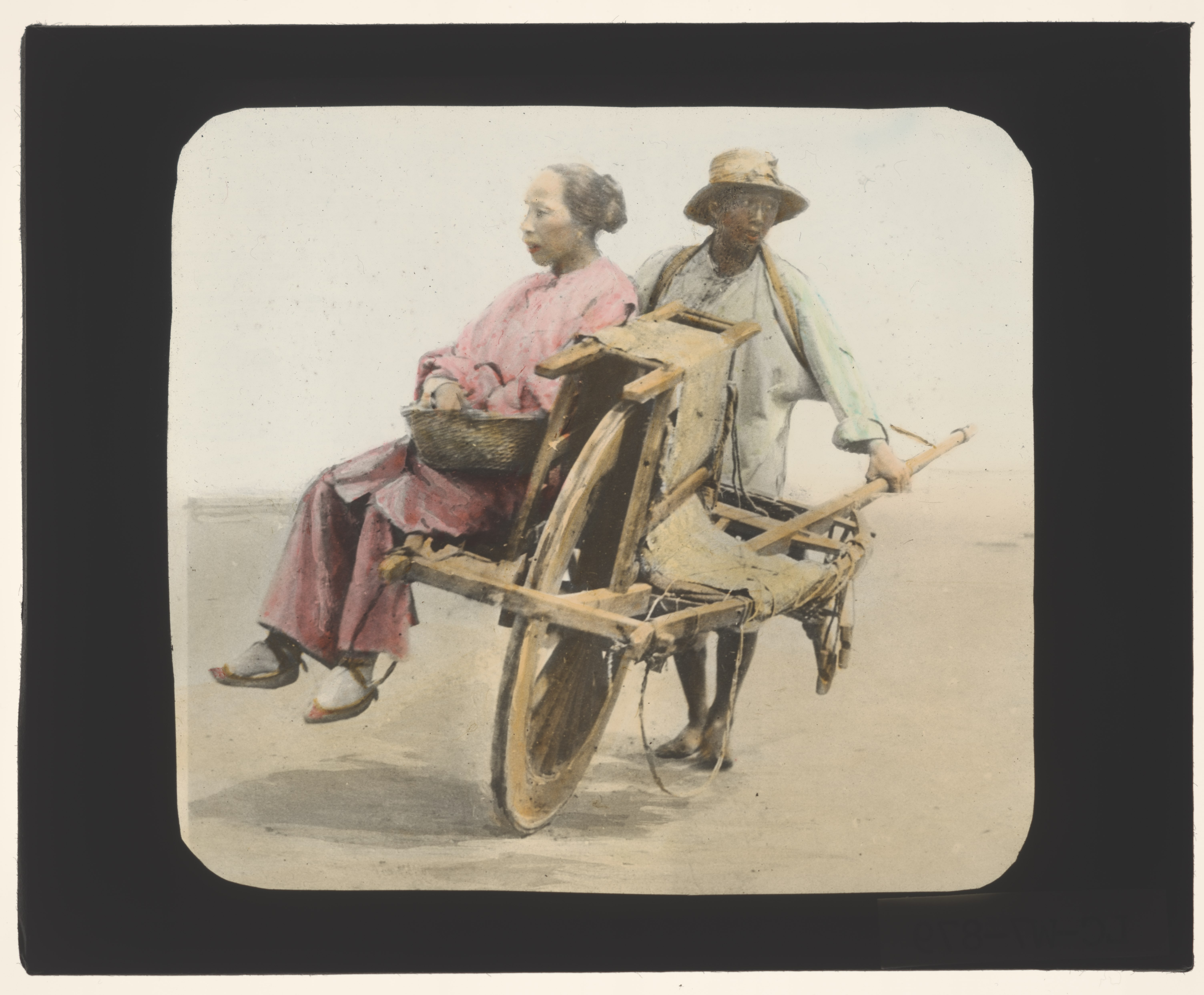
A wheelbarrow rickshaw during the Qing Dynasty.

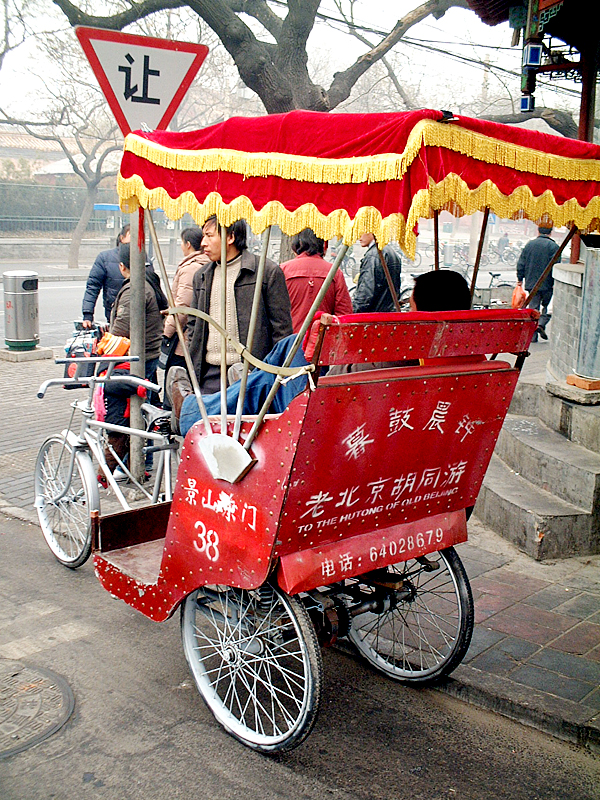
Traditional Chinese touring cycle rickshaw in Beijing.

In China, the rickshaw was first seen in 1873 and was used for public transportation the following year. Within a year there were 10,000 rickshaws in operation. Around 1880 rickshaws appeared in India, first introduced in Simla by Reverend J. Fordyce. At the turn of the century they were introduced in Calcutta, India, and by 1914 were a conveyance for hire. The rickshaw was also introduced to Korea in the late 19th century.

=== 20th century ===
After World War II, there was a major shift in the use of man-powered rickshaws:

Hand-pulled rickshaws became an embarrassment to modernizing urban elites in the Third World, and were widely banned, in part because they were symbolic, not of modernity, but of a feudal world of openly marked class distinctions. Perhaps the seated rickshaw passenger is too close to the back of the laboring driver, who, besides, is metaphorically a draught animal harnessed between shafts.

The cycle rickshaw was built in the 1880s and was first used with regularity starting in 1929 in Singapore. They were found in every south and east Asian country by 1950. By the late 1980s there were an estimated 4 million cycle rickshaws in the world.

==== Africa ====
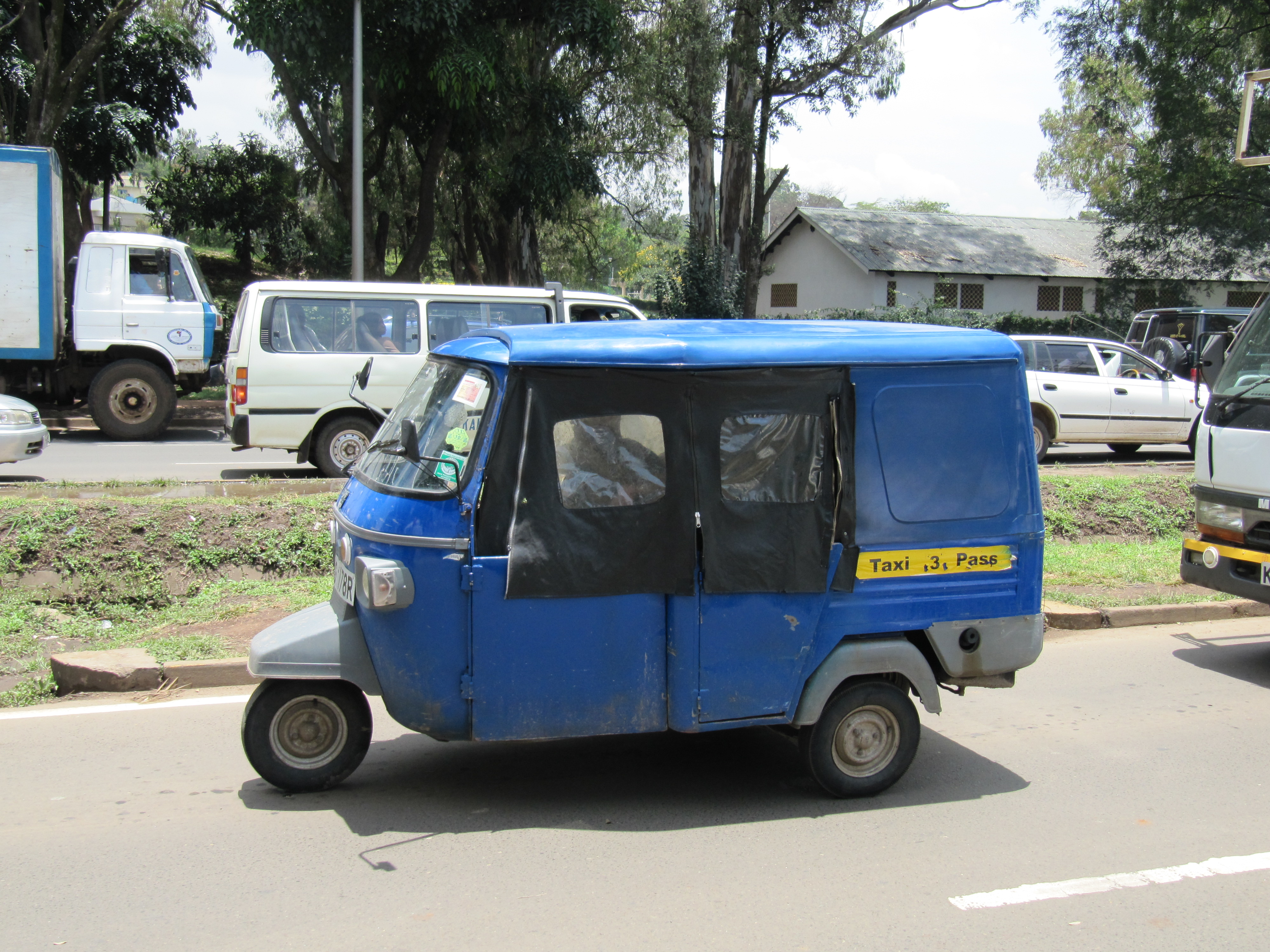
An auto rickshaw (tuk-tuk) in Nairobi.

Rickshaws were introduced to Durban, South Africa, and by 1904 there were about 2,000 registered rickshaw pullers. Rickshaws operated in Nairobi in the beginning of the 20th century; pullers went on strike there in 1908. In the 1920s, they were used in Bagamoyo, Tanga, Tanzania and other areas of East Africa for short distances.

==== Asia ====
The rickshaw's popularity in Japan had declined by the 1930s with the advent of motorized forms of transportation like automobiles and trains. After World War II, when gasoline and automobiles were scarce, they made a temporary comeback. The rickshaw tradition has stayed alive in Kyoto and Tokyo's geisha districts. In the 1990s, German-made cycle rickshaws called "velotaxis" were introduced in Japanese cities, including Kobe.

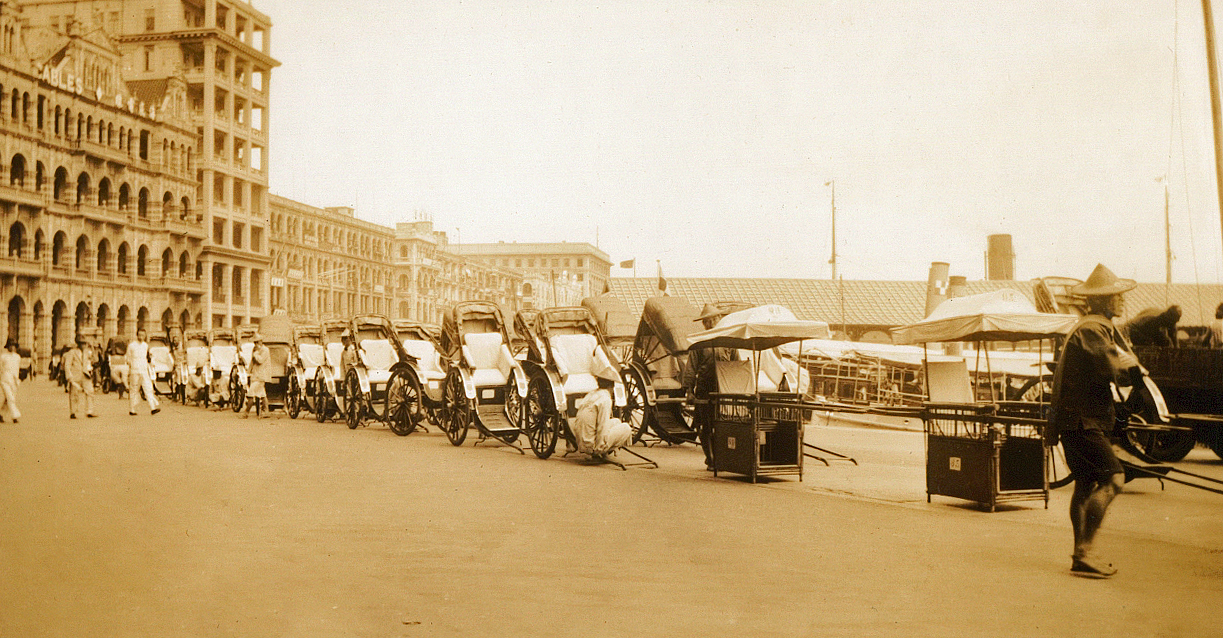
A row of rickshaws parked near a pier in Hong Kong, c. 1930s.

In post-war Hong Kong, rickshaws was one of the main transportation either for transporting goods or for transporting people during the Japanese invasion, known as the Battle of Hong Kong. Japanese military hired many rickshaw pullers to have them gathered and organize with other cooks and seamen for an underground armed team to enact the anti-British Colony clan. However, after World War II, other forms of transport such as pedicabs and streetcar became strong competitors of rickshaws, leading the business of rickshaws into stagnation.

Chiuchow men formed a faction within the Canton rickshaw pullers union in the 1920s. In addition, the Chiuchow pullers could be identified by their hats which were rounded and flat at the top; while the rival Hoklo men had a cone-shaped headgear with sharp points at the top. However, rickshaw use began to decline in the 1920s as the government introduced the streetcar system in 1924. The number of rickshaw pullers had declined from 44,200 to 25,877 six months after the opening of the tramway. It had also caused the Beijing tramway riot in October 1929. A rough form of a rickshaw is sometimes used for hauling coal, building materials or other material. Both motorized and pedal-power cycle rickshaws, or pedicabs, were used for short-distance passenger travel. There are still many rickshaws in many cities for either touring purposes (in big cities such as Beijing and Shanghai, with traditional Chinese rickshaws) or short range transportation in some counties. However, the new Communist government banned rickshaws in Canton in the early 1950s, leading to another low tide of rickshaws.

In Singapore, the rickshaw's popularity increased into the 20th century. There were approximately 50,000 rickshaws in 1920 and that number had doubled by 1930. Cycle rickshaws were used in Singapore beginning in 1929. Within six years pulled rickshaws were outnumbered by cycle rickshaws, which were also used by sightseeing tourists. (Note: Other means of transportation in Singapore are buses, lorries and trams.)

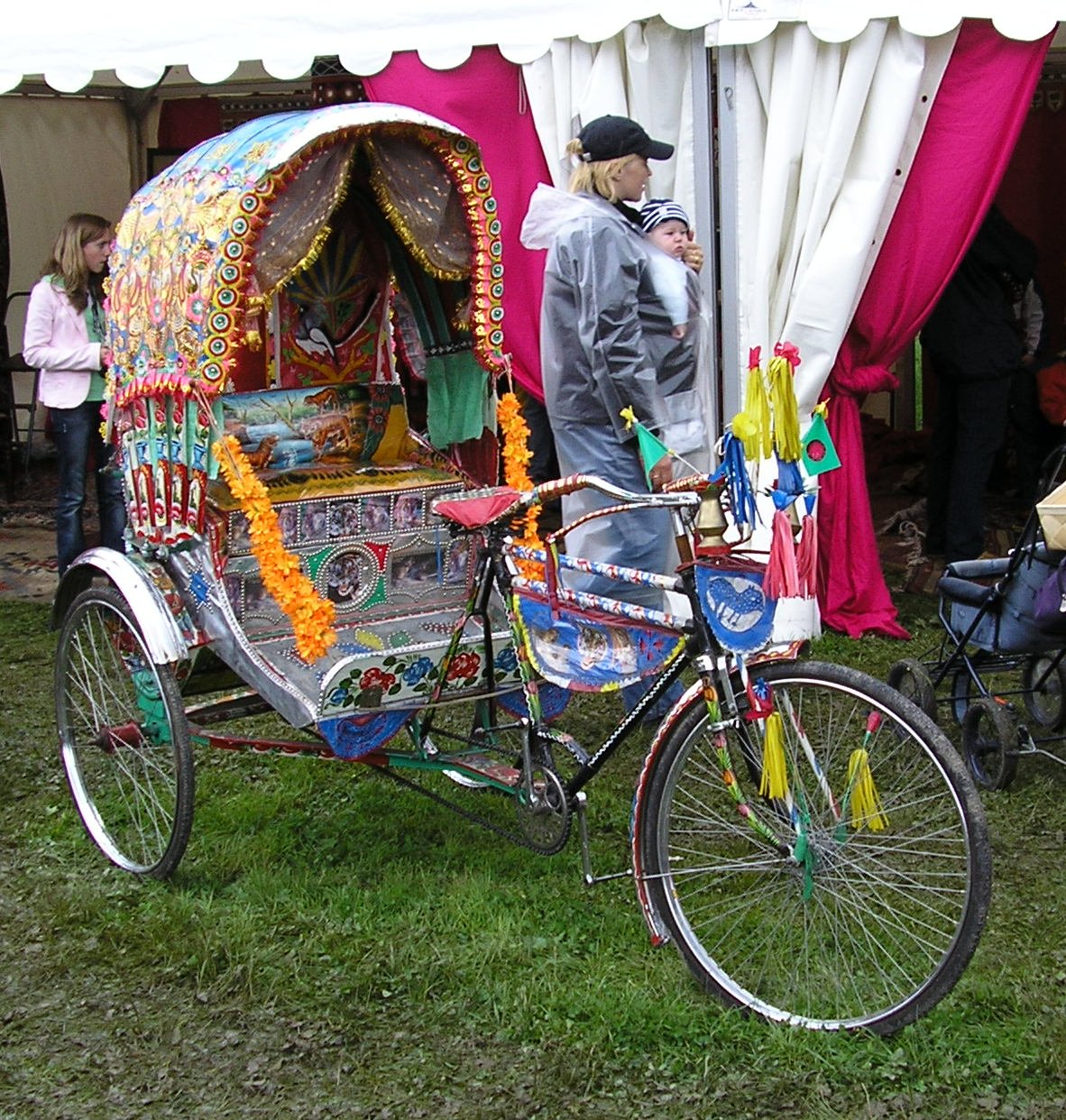
A Bangladeshi cycle rickshaw in Sweden.

In the 1930s, cycle rickshaws were used in Dhaka, Bangladesh, Kolkata, India; and Jakarta, Indonesia. By 1950 they could be found in many South and East Asian countries. By the end of the 20th century, there were 300,000 such vehicles in Dhaka. By the end of 2013, there were about 100,000 electric rickshaws in Delhi.

In Viêtnam, the rickshaw was called with the French name "Pousse-pousse". In 1883, Jean Thomas Raoul Bonnal, Supérior Résident of Tonkin, import 2 rickshaws from Japan in the city of Hanoi and made copies of them.

==== North America ====
Pedicabs were introduced in North America in 1962, where they were a means of transportation at the Seattle World's Fair in the state of Washington.

=== 21st century ===
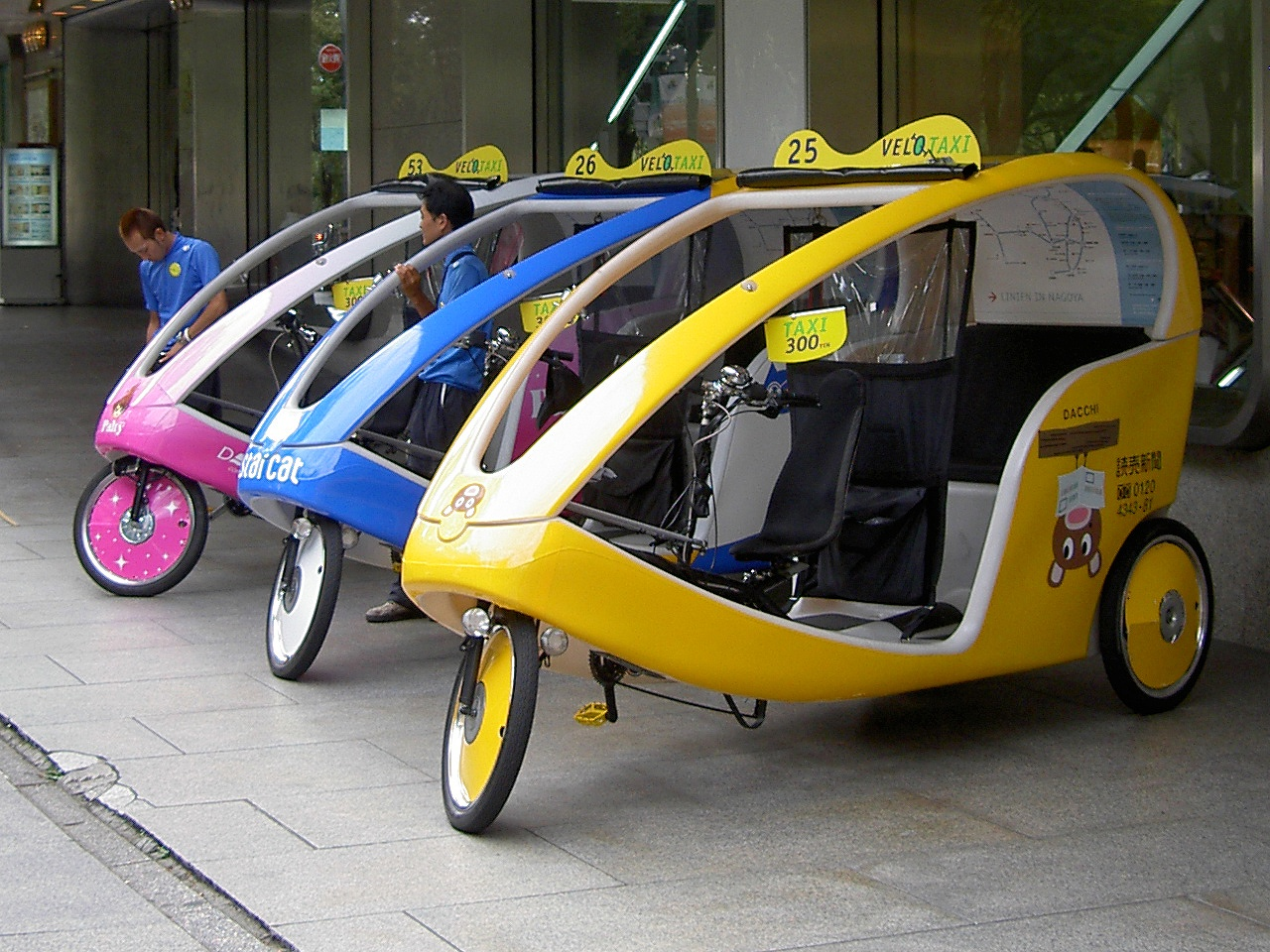
Velotaxis in Nagoya, Japan, 2005.

Various rickshaws for tourists in Asakusa, Japan, 2015.

The 21st century has seen a resurgence in rickshaws, particularly in motorized rickshaws and cycle rickshaws. Auto rickshaws, also called velotaxis, have resurged as they are about 1/3 to 1/2 the cost of regular taxis. German velotaxis are three-wheeled, powered vehicles with a space for a driver and, behind the driver, space for two passengers. Cycle rickshaws are used in many Asian, North American, and European cities. They are increasingly being used as an eco-friendly way of short-range transportation, particularly in urban areas. Along with auto rickshaws, they are also used (particularly by Asian cities) for tourism, because of their "novelty value as an entertaining form of transportation".

==== Africa ====
In Madagascar, pulled cycle and auto rickshaws are a common form of transportation in a number of cities, especially Antsirabe. They are known as pousse-pousse, meaning push-push. Aboboyaa is a tricycle used in the transportation of goods and service in Ghana.

==== Asia ====
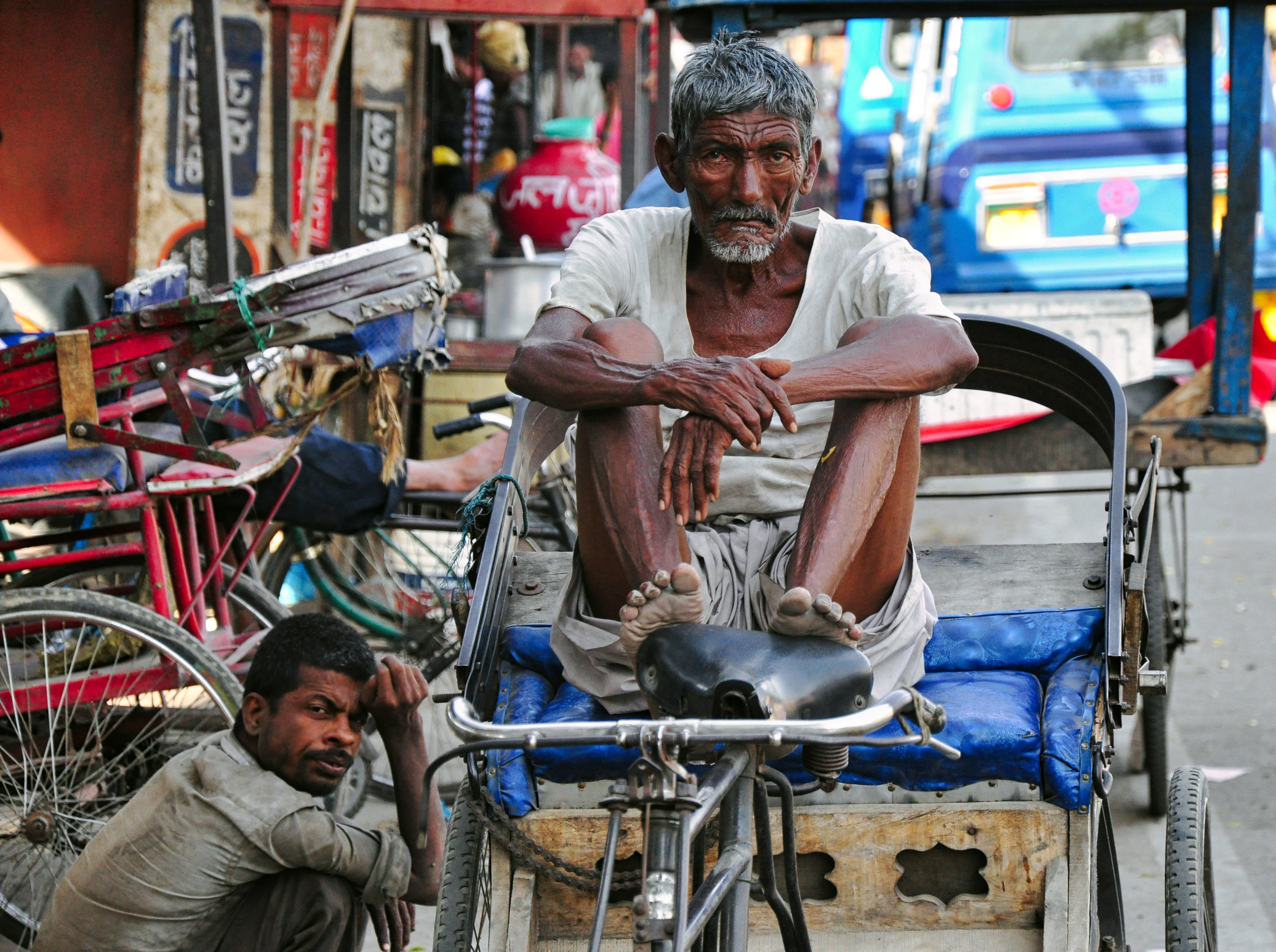
Rickshaw drivers in Haridwar

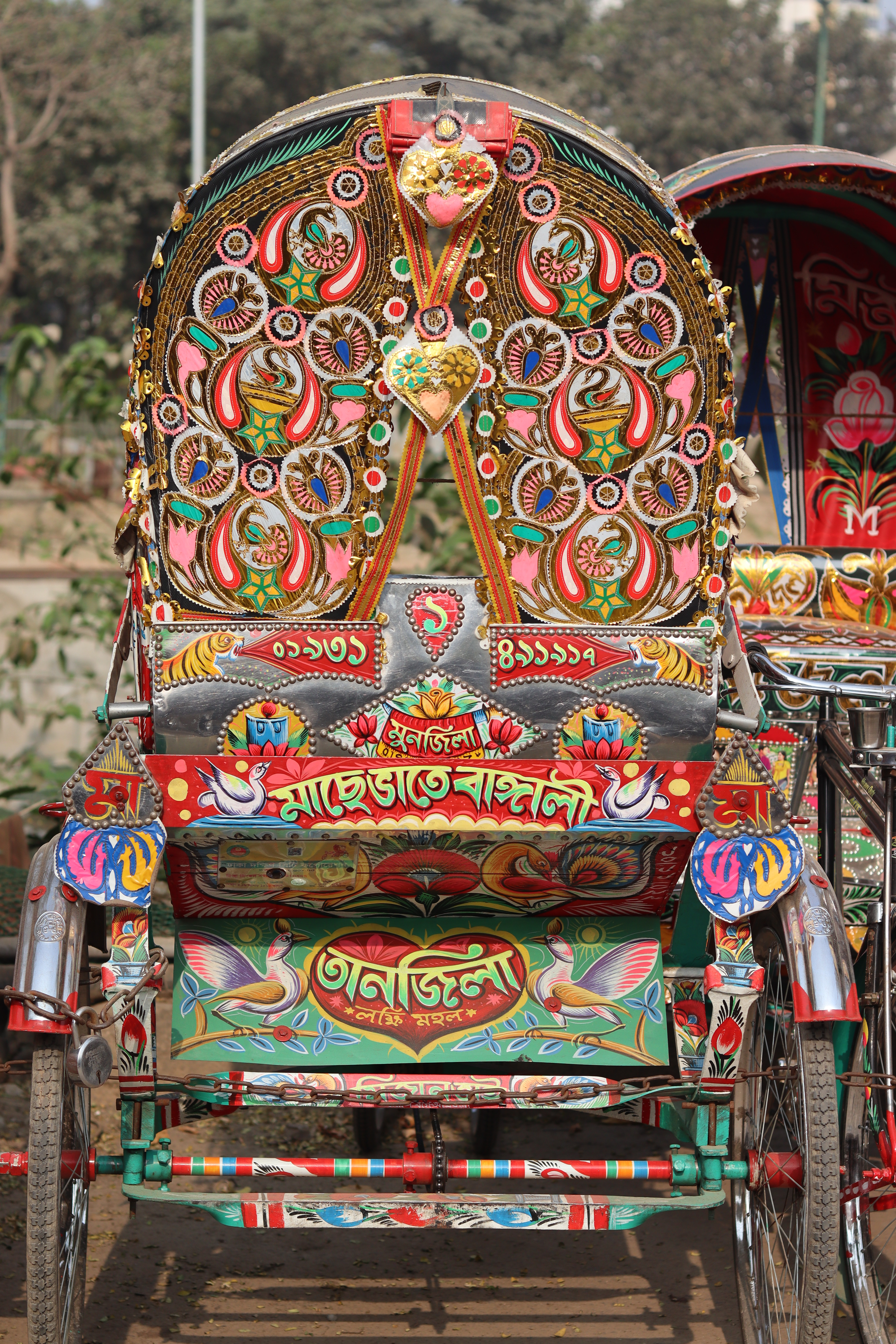
Cycle rickshaw decoration in Bangladesh

Macau still uses tri-wheeled bicycle rickshaw, or riquexó in Portuguese, as Macau was a Portuguese colony in the past. This kind of transportation was very famous until the late 20th century, due to the fact of being a small city and few cars, not so many motorcycles, very bad public transport and no other transport such as train or subway. You can go around Macau peninsula and the twos island on rickshaw, and visit the Riquexó Museum and see the evolution of rickshaws from the 18th century until modern times.

Automated cycle rickshaws, called velotaxis, are popular in Kyoto and Tokyo, Japan. Their use is growing at a rate of about 20–30% a year in Japanese cities. The traditional rickshaws are still alive for travelers in some tourist places in Japan. Rickshaws are found in Hong Kong. In China, automated and pedal-power cycle rickshaws, or pedicabs, are used for short-distance passenger travel in large cities and many medium-sized cities. Most Indian cities offer auto rickshaw service; hand-pulled rickshaws do exist in some areas, such as Kolkata (Calcutta) as a part of their transport system which also includes cycle rickshaws. Sri Lanka has over 1 million auto rickshaws registered in use as of 2018.

==== Australia ====
In Australia, cycle rickshaws or trishaws (three wheels) are used in Melbourne and St Kilda. They are also seen in Cowaramup, Western Australia at Bakehouse '38.

==== Europe ====
Cycle rickshaws or trishaws (three wheels) are used in some large continental European cities, such as:

- Austria: Vienna
- Denmark: Copenhagen and Odense
- Estonia: Tallinn
- France: Paris and Nantes
- Germany: Lake Constance, Berlin, Frankfurt, Hamburg, Hanover and other cities.
- Hungary: Budapest
- Ireland: Cork and Dublin.
- Italy: Florence, Milan, and Rome
- The Netherlands: Amsterdam and in the Caribbean, Willemstad
- Norway: Oslo
- Poland: Kraków and Łódź
- Russia: Saint Petersburg
- Spain: Barcelona
- Switzerland: Bern
- Romania: Bucharest

Within the United Kingdom, pedicabs operate in:

- London, mostly in Soho and other areas of central London. Their activity is not regulated by Transport for London, so there are no limits of the fees they can charge. (Note: Rickshaws or Pedicabs as they are also known, have been operating on the streets of London for over seven years in and around the West End, Soho, Covent Garden and Leicester Square areas.) The Queen's Speech in May 2022 introduced plans to legislate a licensing scheme for pedicabs which was later enacted as the Pedicabs (London) Act 2024, introducing a formal licensing and regulatory framework for their operation.
- Edinburgh, where vendors are hired like taxis and provide tours.
- Oxford.
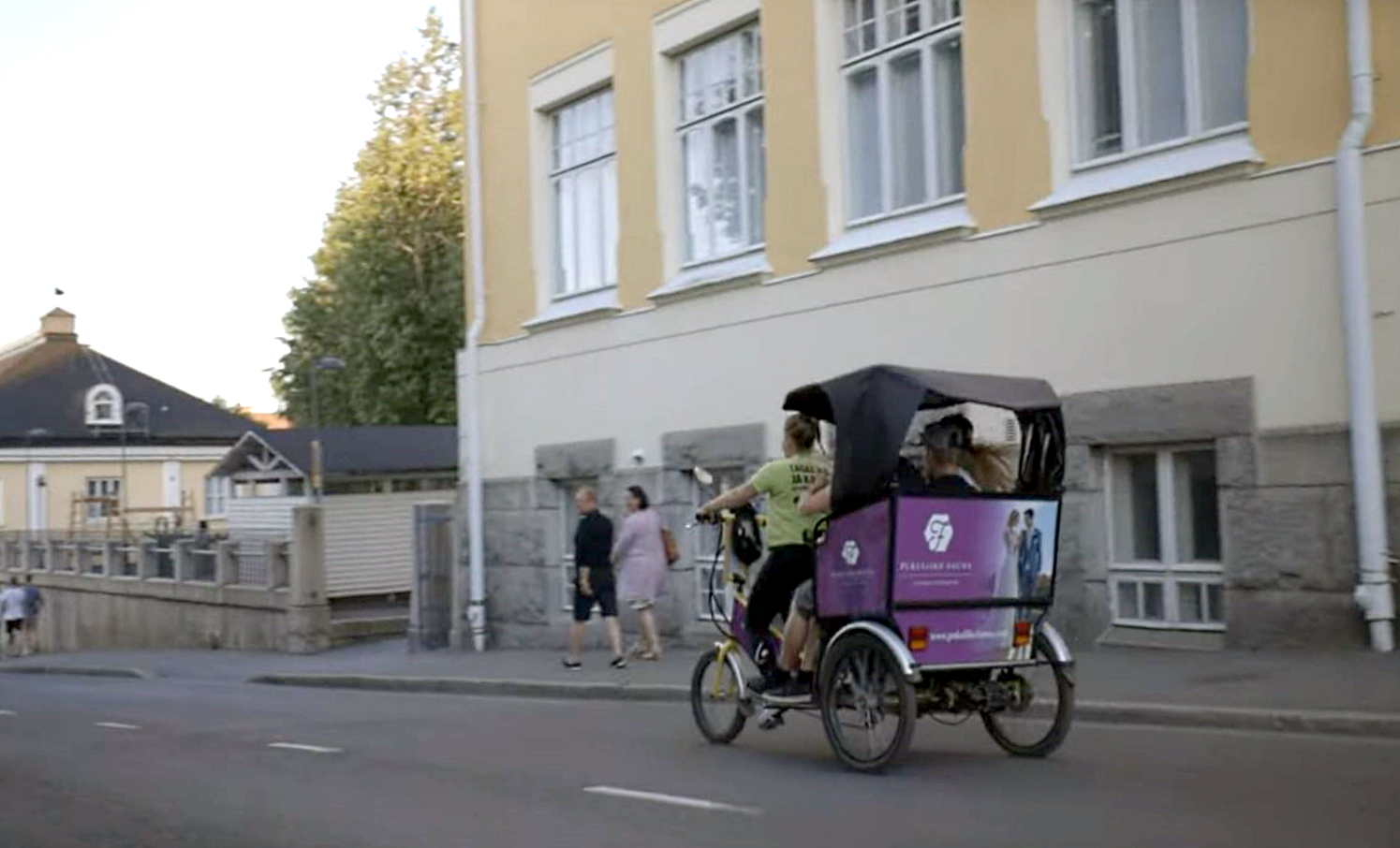
Biketaxi rickshaw in Kuopio, Finland.

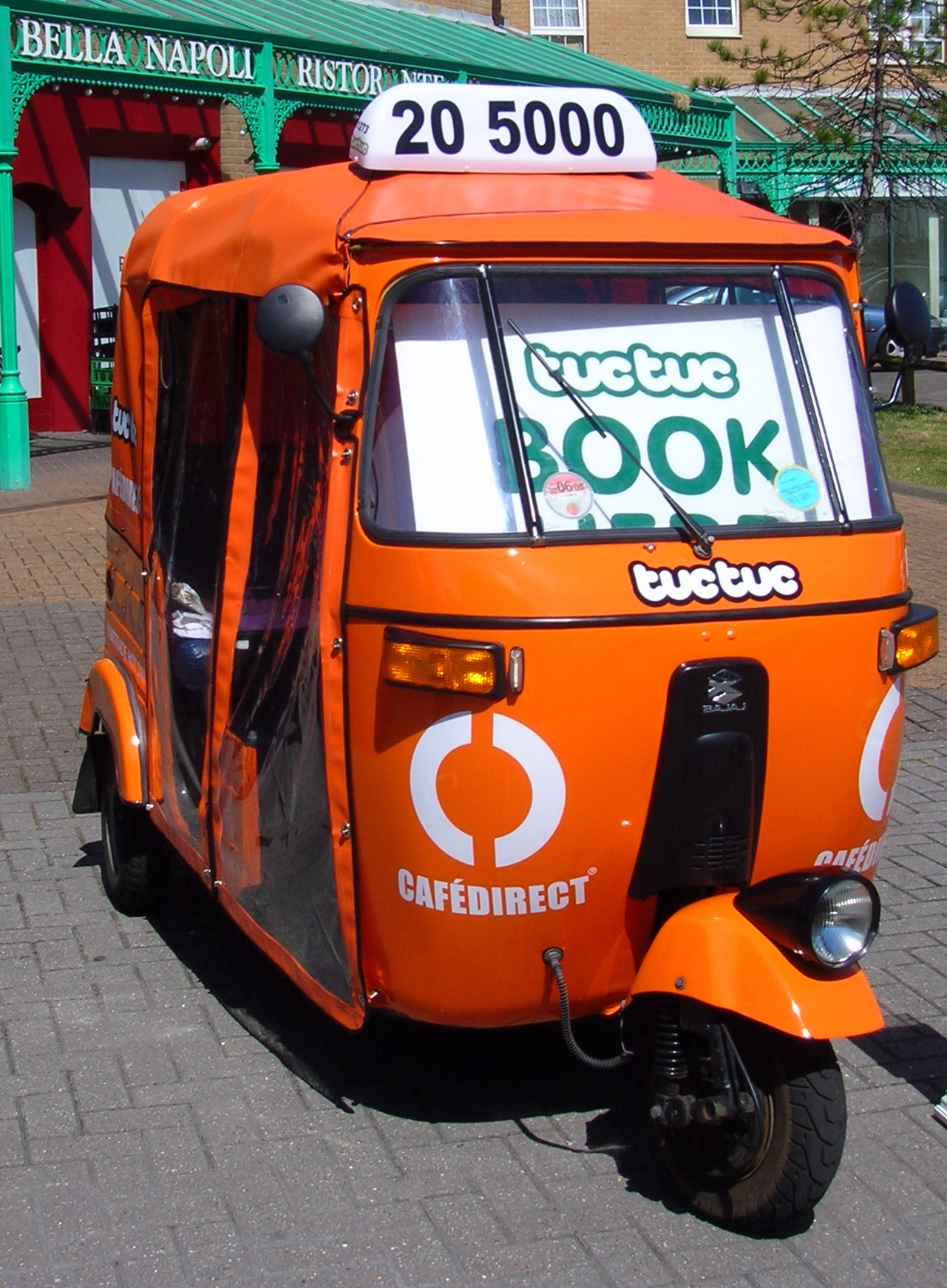
Auto rickshaw located in Brighton Marina.

==== North America ====
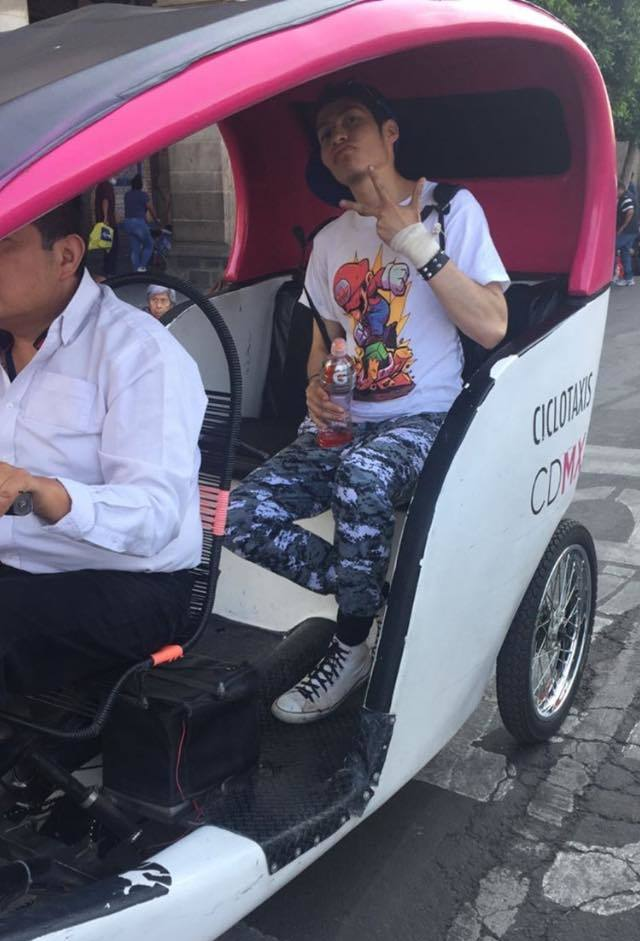
A cycle rickshaw (bicitaxi) in Mexico City, 2019.

- In Canada, there are pedicabs in operation in Victoria and Vancouver. They are regulated in Toronto and Vancouver. Pulled rickshaw rides are available in downtown Ottawa, with tours of historical Byward Market.
- In the United States, San Diego and New York City each host hundreds of pedicabs; dozens of other North American cities also have pedicab services. In New York, human powered transport is used primarily by tourists due to its cost. (Note: At a rate of $5 plus $1 per block per person, a 20-block (one mile) pedicab ride for two people will cost $50. In a taxicab, the same ride would cost under $10. According to Peter Meitzler of New York's Manhattan Rickshaw Company, a passenger has an entirely different urban experience when one rides in a rickshaw.) In New Orleans, pedicabs have been used to transport French Quarter tourists since the summer of 2012.
- In Mexico, there are thousands of pedicabs. All drivers are in informal circumstances, and have precarious working conditions, long hours (11.3 hours a day), low wages (US$59.18 per week), and no social protections or benefits. 6.3% reported suffering from a disease, 49.5% corresponded to musculoskeletal conditions and only 11.6% were affiliated to any health system. 53.8% are owners of the vehicle and, although it does not seem to influence physical illness (P=0.03), it is related to the psychosocial ones (P=0.260).

== Types ==
Types of rickshaws include:

- a pulled rickshaw; a two-wheeled passenger cart pulled by a human runner
- a cycle rickshaw, also called a pedicab
- an auto rickshaw, also called a tuk-tuk, auto, mototaxi, or baby taxi
- an electric rickshaw, also called e-rickshaw.
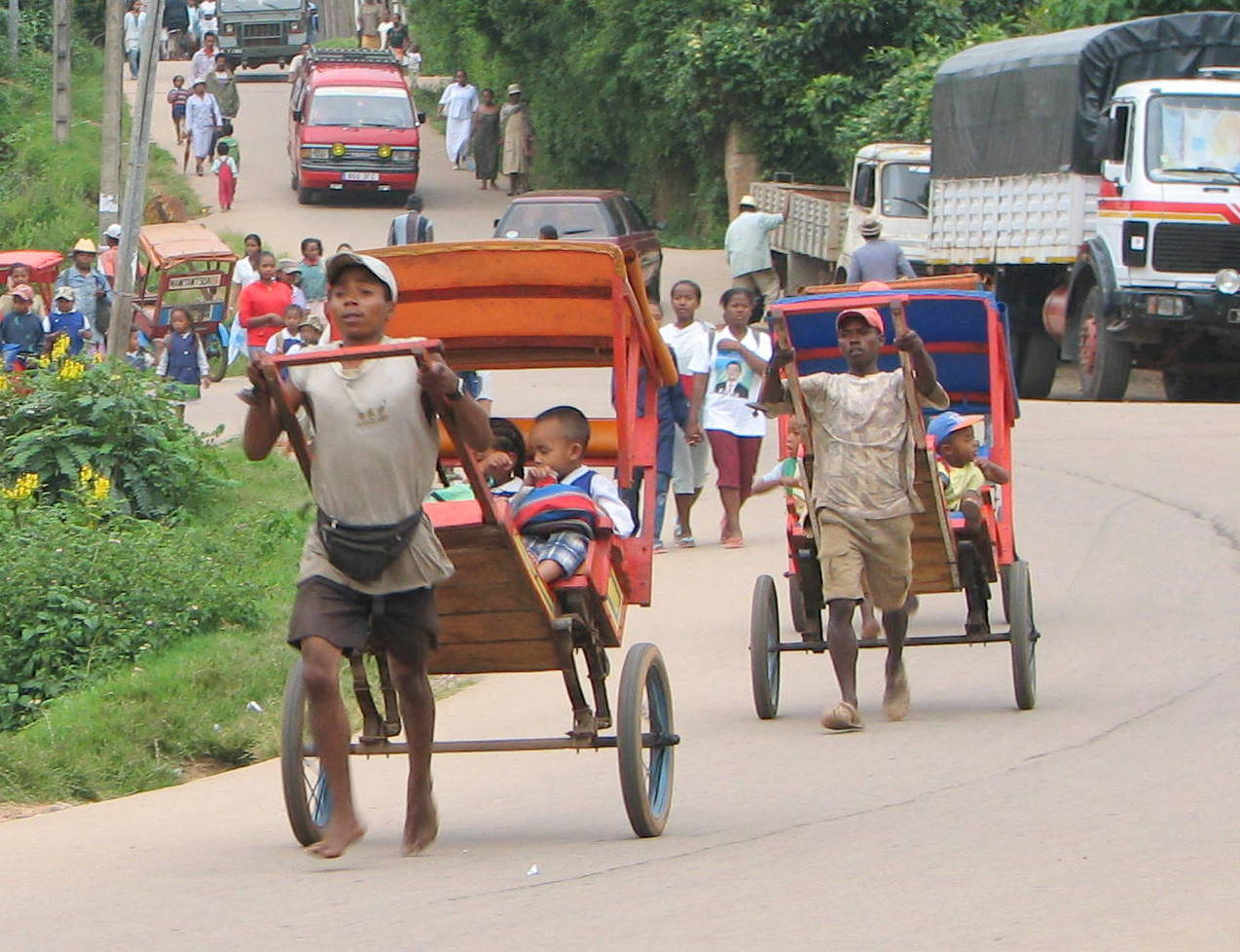
Pulled rickshaw, Madagascar

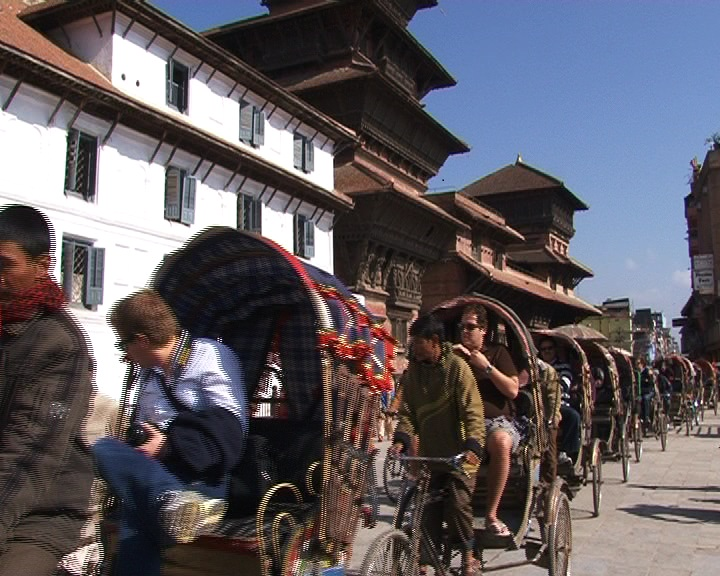
Cycle rickshaws, Nepal

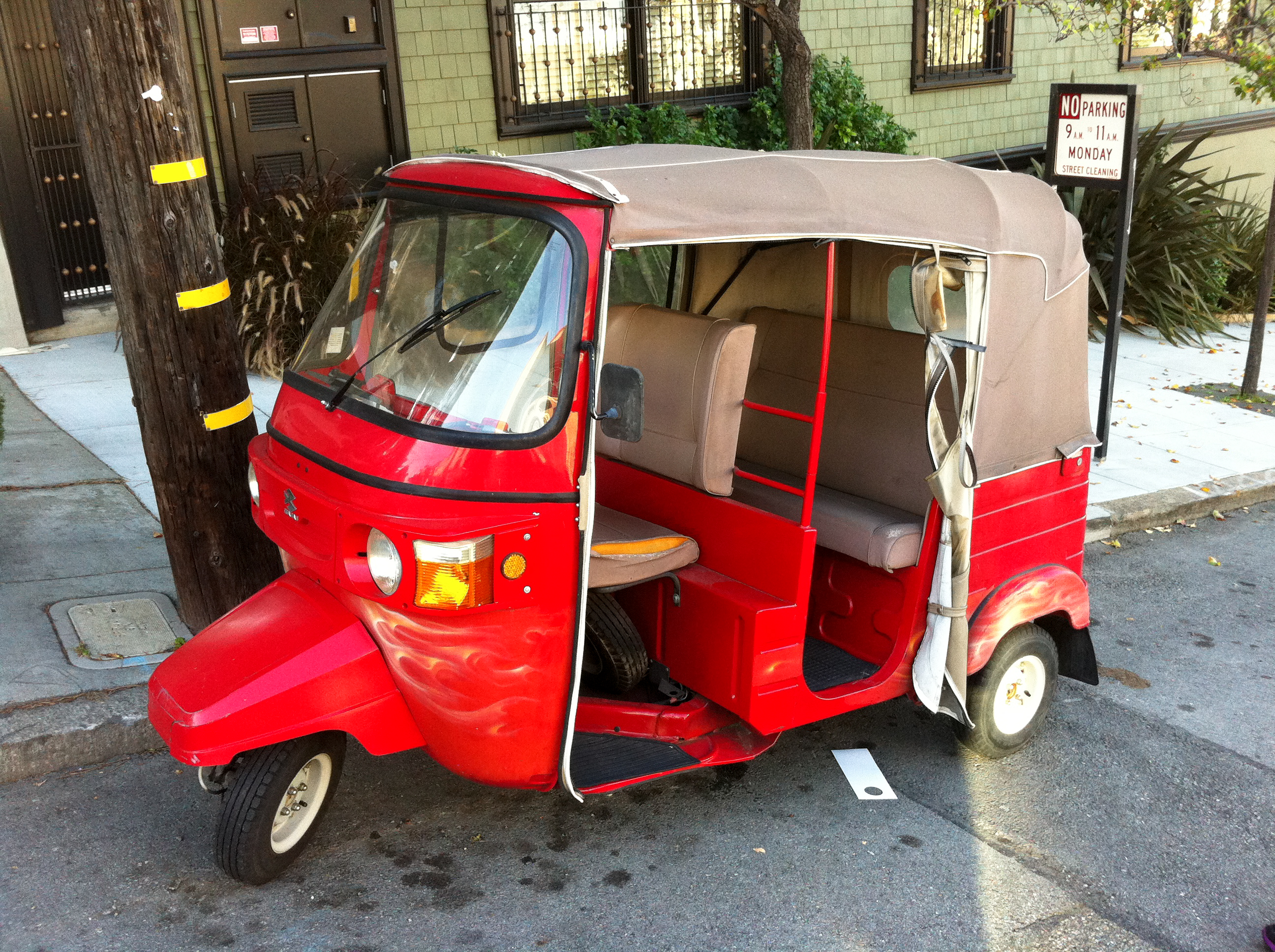
Auto rickshaw, San Francisco, California

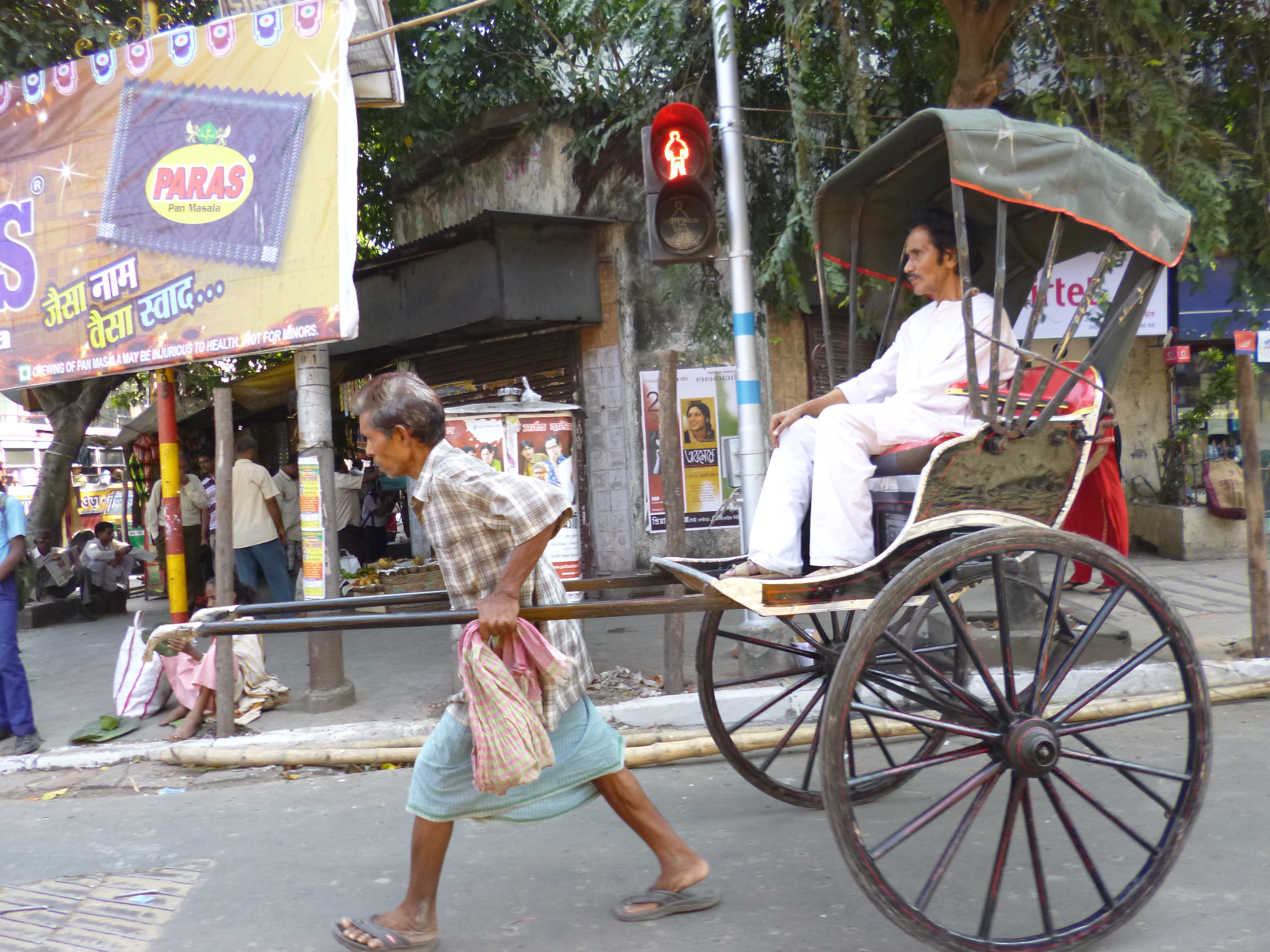
Pulled Rickshaw in Kolkata

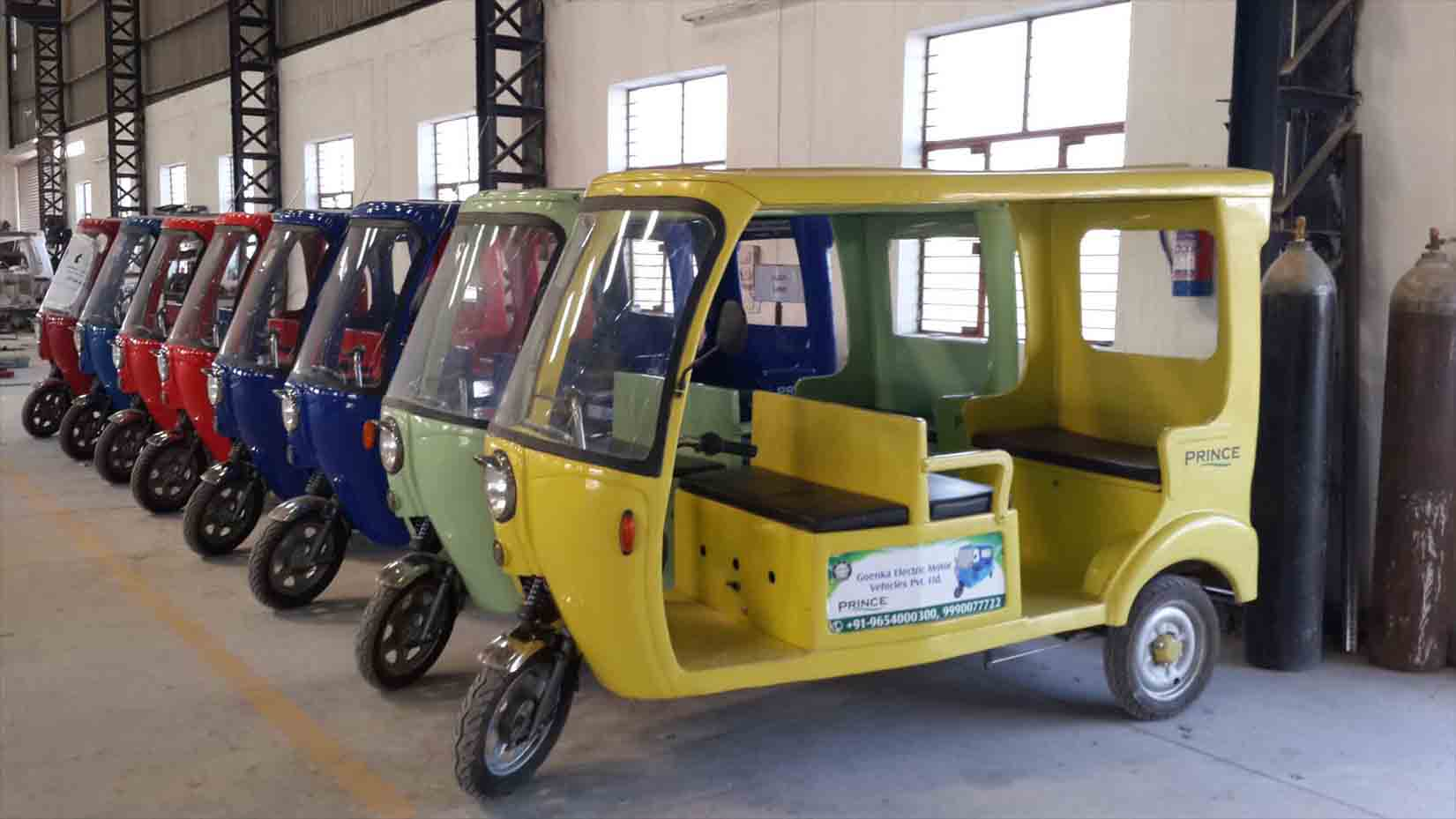
FRP, GEM e-rickshaw Haryana, India

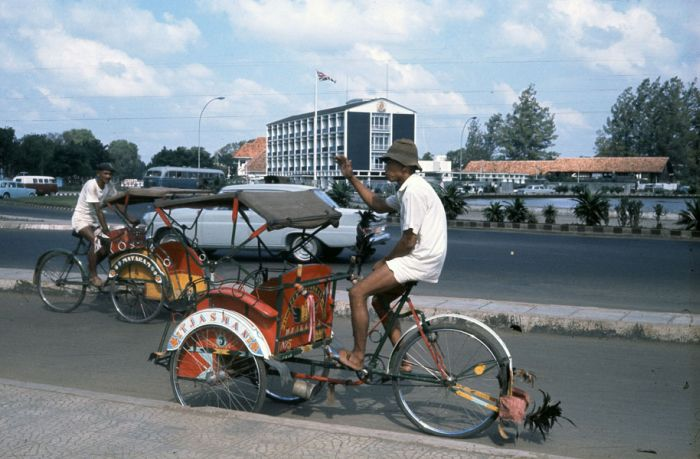
Cycle rickshaw in Jakarta, Indonesia known as "Bechak"

== See also ==
Rickshaws

- Auto rickshaw
- Cycle rickshaw
- Electric rickshaw
- Pulled rickshaw
- Rickshaw art

Designers

- George Bliss (pedicab designer)

Other human powered transport

- Bath chair
- Bicycle trailer
- Boda boda (bicycle taxi)
- Cargo bike
- Human-powered transport
- Quadracycle
- Utility cycling
