= Walter Judd (politician) =

American politician and physician (1898–1994)

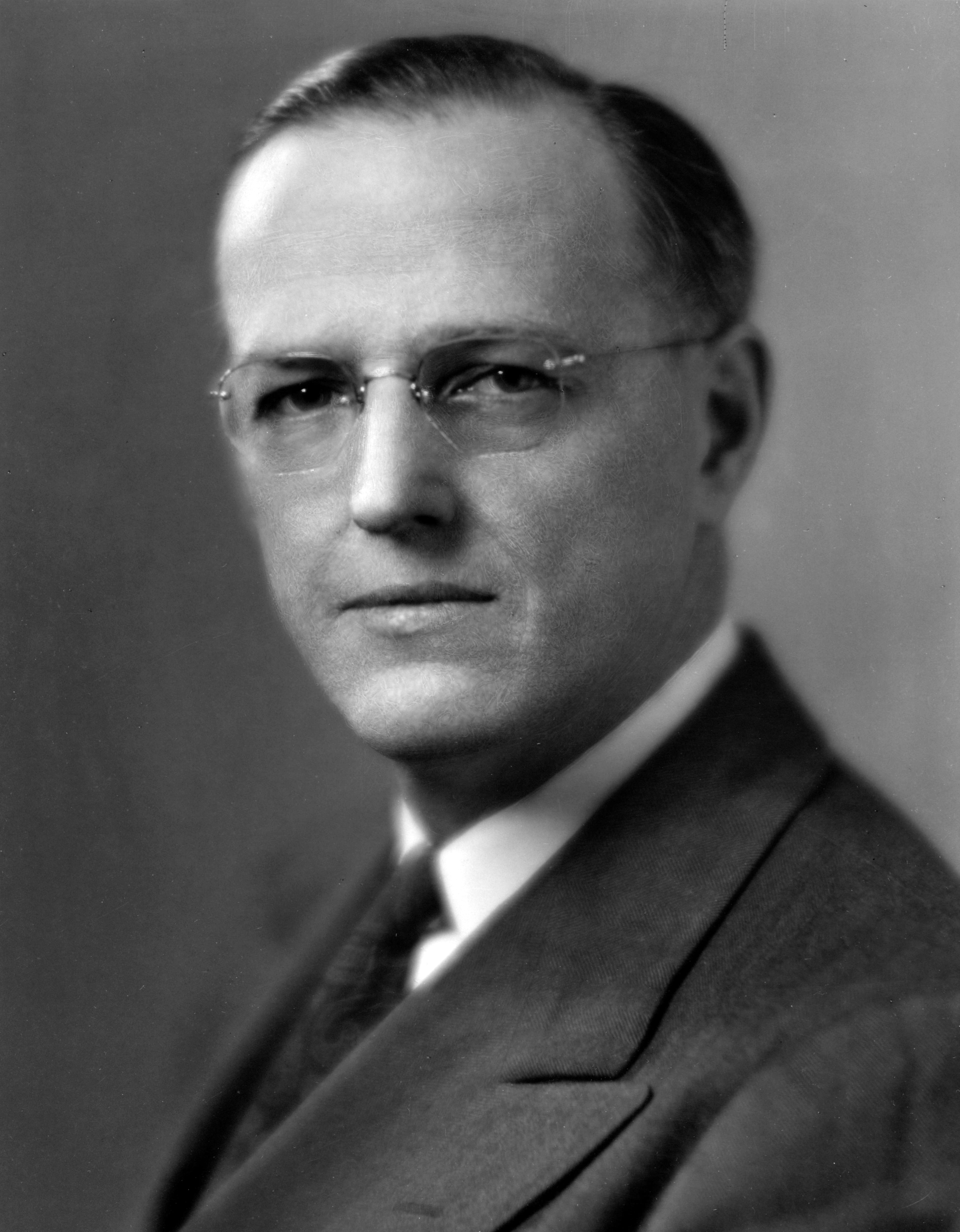
- Judd in 1946

Member of the U.S. House of Representatives from Minnesota's 5th district
- In office January 3, 1943 – January 3, 1963
- Preceded by: Oscar Youngdahl
- Succeeded by: Donald M. Fraser

Personal details
- Born: Walter Henry Judd; September 25, 1898 Rising City, Nebraska, U.S.
- Died: February 13, 1994 (aged 95) Mitchellville, Maryland, U.S.
- Party: Republican
- Education: University of Nebraska (BS, MD)
- Awards: Presidential Medal of Freedom (1981)

Walter Henry Judd (September 25, 1898 – February 13, 1994), also known as I-te Chou (Chinese: 周以德), was an American politician and physician, best known for his battle in Congress (1943–63) to define the conservative position on China as all-out support for the Nationalists under Chiang Kai-shek and opposition to the Communists under Mao Zedong. After the Nationalists fled to Formosa (Taiwan) in 1949, Judd redoubled his support.

== Early life and education ==
Judd was born in Rising City, Nebraska, the son of Mary Elizabeth (Greenslit) and Horace Hunter Judd. After training with the ROTC for the United States Army near the end of World War I, he earned his M.D. degree from the University of Nebraska in 1923.

== Career ==
After earning his medical degree from the University of Nebraska, Judd became the traveling secretary for the Student Volunteer Movement. From 1925 through 1931, Judd was a medical missionary in China, sent to assist Edward Bliss. He worked first in small clinic a backwater town, then became head of a large hospital in a sizable city.

From 1931 to 1934, he worked at the Mayo Clinic in Rochester, Minnesota. Then, in 1934, he returned to China as a missionary physician until 1938, when he returned to Minnesota.

Upon his return the United States, he did not urge Americans to be isolationists. Instead, Judd encouraged support of China against Japanese aggression.

=== U.S. Congress ===
In 1942, Judd was elected to the U.S. Congress from Minnesota, where he became a powerful voice in support of China. He served for 20 years from 1943 until 1963 in the 78th, 79th, 80th, 81st, 82nd, 83rd, 84th, 85th, 86th, and 87th congresses. Judd voted in favor of the Civil Rights Acts of 1957 and 1960, as well as the 24th Amendment to the U.S. Constitution.

Judd was known for his eloquent oratory and expertise in U.S. foreign policy. He spoke at civic and political gatherings around the nation. He was a good friend of Senator Harry S. Truman, and together they spent two weeks in 1943 making speeches in support of the United Nations, doubling up in hotel rooms at night. In Congress, Judd supported liberal international program such as the Truman Doctrine, the Marshall Plan, and NATO. He called for removal of ethnic and racial restrictions in the immigration laws. He was an outspoken anti-communist and critic of U.S. rapprochement with China at the expense of Taiwan. In the early 1950s, Judd helped organize the Committee of One Million, a citizens' group dedicated to keeping the People's Republic of China out of the United Nations.

Judd gave the keynote address at the 1960 Republican National Convention, which met in Chicago to nominate the Nixon-Lodge ticket.

In 1962, Judd was defeated for reelection by liberal Democrat Donald M. Fraser. The District had been redrawn after the 1960 census, making it heavily Democratic. Judd's defeat worked to increase Otto Passman's power on the foreign aid subcommittee. He was the last person to attempt to run for president on a major party ticket to have been born in the 19th century, though he did not make it past the primaries. In 1964, Judd's name was placed in nomination at the Republican National Convention for President and he received a smattering of votes.

According to biographer Yanli Gao:

Judd was both a Wilsonian moralist and a Jacksonian protectionist, whose efforts were driven by a general Christian understanding of human beings, as well as a missionary complex. As he appealed simultaneously to American national interests and a popular Christian moral conscience, the Judd experience demonstrated that determined courageous advocacy by missionaries did in fact help to shape an American foreign policy needing to be awakened from its isolationist slumbers.

=== Testimony before US Congress in 1939 ===
Judd said in testimony before US Congress on 25 April 1939, that not even one-hundredth of 1 percent of the Chinese people supported Japan, and that many Chinese "puppet" collaborators were in fact double agents against Japan, with him personally knowing a "puppet" magistrate in and occupied city who gave 30% of the taxes he collected to anti-Japanese guerilla fighters and he said he only did not personally join the guerilla war and stayed behind to pretend to collaborate, because he was too old to fight.

Judd also said that Japan didn't control huge swaths of areas they were nominally marked as Japanese occupied on maps, saying "there is no place that they control more than 10 miles, and most places not more than 2 miles, outside the cities and the lines of communication." and "You can rightly say that the Japanese Army is still in a state of siege in the areas in China." A Japanese soldier admitted that "Japanese occupied territory was only a few dots and lines."

Judd also mentioned how the Japanese invasion was enabled by American made trucks, machines and raw materials, which Japan needed to fight China:

"Lead, copper, hides, cotton, tractors, lumber sail from our ports every week. They do not buy our processed munitions, so-called "arms, ammunition, and implements of war"-they buy our machines and raw materials, take them to Japan or to Manchuria where the largest arsenal now is, and process them themselves with their own cheaper labor. They are entirely dependent on us for the parts and accessories for the American-made machinery.

Take the matter of trucks. The single most decisive factor in the whole war thus far, away from the seacoast and rivers, is the American truck. The Chinese soldiers are almost entirely on foot, pushing wheelbarrows, leading donkeys. The Japanese soldiers American wheels. My province lies behind long mountain ranges on the east and north, with only a dozen or so long, narrow, tortuous, difficult passes through them. I saw those eight millions of people lose their homes and freedom and things dearer than life itself; and it never could have happened without the American automobile. And the lines of communication, some of them 600 miles long, simply could not be maintained for a month now, a year later, without the American truck."

== Awards and recognition ==
=== Presidential Medal of Freedom ===
In 1981, he received the Presidential Medal of Freedom, the nation's highest civilian award. Throughout the 1970s and 1980s, he was actively involved in the Council Against Communist Aggression in Washington, D.C.

=== Walter Judd Freedom Award ===
The Fund for American Studies, an educational and internship program that works in partnership with George Mason University, annually presents the Walter Judd Freedom Award in cooperation with the Center for International Relations to recognize individuals who have advanced the cause of freedom in the United States and abroad. Past recipients have included former United States President Ronald Reagan, Jack Kemp, Jeane Kirkpatrick, and George J. Viksnins, a professor emeritus at Georgetown University.

== Death ==
On February 13, 1994, Judd died of cancer in Mitchellville, Maryland, aged 95. He is interred with his wife, Miriam, at Blue Valley Cemetery in Surprise, Nebraska.

U.S. House of Representatives
Preceded by Oscar Youngdahl	Member of the U.S. House of Representatives from Minnesota's 5th congressional district 1943–1963	Succeeded by Donald M. Fraser
Party political offices
Preceded by Arthur B. Langlie	Keynote Speaker of the Republican National Convention; 1960	Succeeded by Mark Hatfield
