= Adam Purple =

American guerrilla gardener and child molester

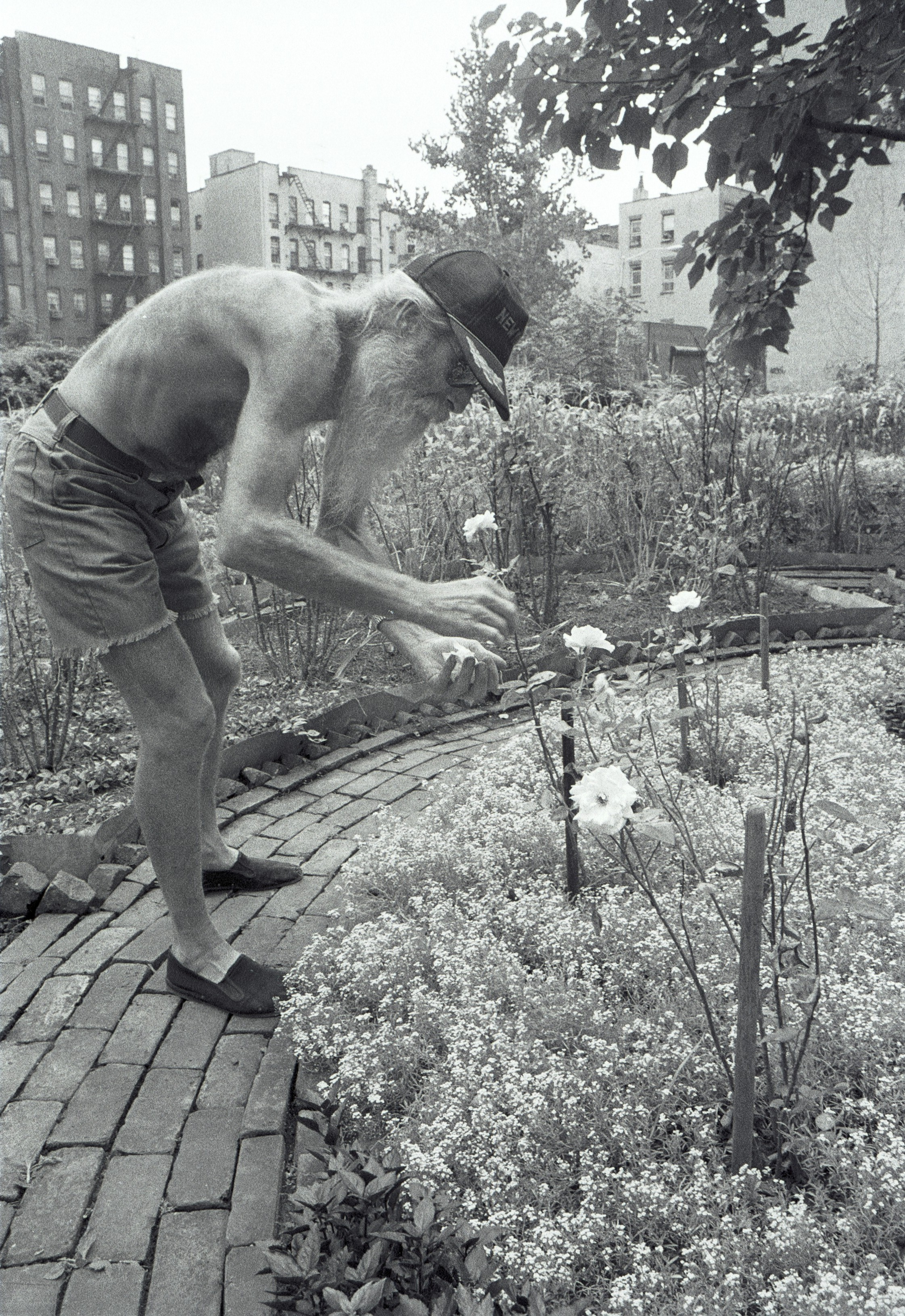
- Adam Purple tending his Urban Garden in 1984
- Born: David Lloyd Wilkie; November 10, 1930; Independence, Missouri, U.S.
- Died: September 14, 2015 (aged 84); New York City, New York, U.S.
- Occupation: Activist

David Lloyd Wilkie (November 10, 1930 – September 14, 2015), known as Adam Purple, was an American activist, Guerrilla Gardener, and convicted sex offender famous in New York City for his "Garden of Eden". He went by many other names, including "Rev. Les Ego".

== Early life ==
Born in Independence, Missouri, to Richard and Juanita Wilkie as the middle child of seven, his father was a machinist, carpenter and blacksmith while Juanita was a seamstress, gardener and bookkeeper. In 1945, Richard was trying to put out a fire when he was electrocuted and died.

Adam served in the U.S. Army and graduated with a master's degree in journalism from the University of Missouri. He taught at high schools and junior colleges in California and South Dakota. Making his way east, he was a reporter for The York Gazette and Daily in York, Pennsylvania, eventually ending up in New York City in 1968.

== Family and move to Australia ==
He had at least four biological children and two stepchildren. With his first wife, Ann, he had two daughters, Jenean and Lenore. His second wife, Romola, had two daughters, Dorothy and Diane. A later partner, known as "Eve", gave birth to a girl, Nova Dawn. He also had a son with a later partner.

In 1964, Wilkie and his wife, Romola, and their "blended family" of four girls emigrated to Australia, by boat. They traveled on the Orsova, docking in New South Wales after a three-month voyage. Wilkie worked as an English and literature teacher. The family lived in Kurrajong Heights, near Sydney. He moved to the Haight-Ashbury area of San Francisco, California.

== Abuse and Deportation from Australia ==
Wilkie was convicted of child molestation in Australia and deported in the late 1960s or early 1970s. Accounts of his eldest children published in two parts in The Villager in January 2016 detailed years of abuse, in particular sexual abuse, by their father; this allegedly included being shown pornography; being given and forced to use dildos their father made; and being used as a “sex slave” and made to perform at gatherings. One daughter claimed Wilkie made her put in an IUD that left her permanently unable to have children. One of his step-daughters alleged he would sometimes kick them with steel-toed boots and once chased her in his car, apparently trying to run her over. Another step-daughter says one incident of physical abuse was so severe it gave her scoliosis.

== Garden of Eden ==
Purple's "Garden of Eden", built by him single-handedly over five years starting in 1975, was a well-known open, community garden on Forsyth Street on the Lower East Side of Manhattan. The garden began when the city and the neighborhood were blighted with urban decay. A building was razed in 1973 on Eldridge Street behind Purple's apartment, and he decided to plant something with his companion, Eve.

The process of clearing the lot took some time since the couple would only use hand tools. Modern machinery was considered "counter-revolutionary." He would haul manure from the horse-drawn carriages around Central Park and created a highly fertile topsoil. The garden was ready to be planted in the spring of 1975. The garden was designed around concentric circles with a yin-yang symbol in the center. As buildings were torn down on either side, Purple would add new rings to the garden, allowing it to grow. By the end, it was 15,000 square feet featuring a wide range of produce, including corn, cucumbers, cherry tomatoes, asparagus, black raspberries, strawberries, and 45 trees including eight black walnuts. He regularly bicycled to Central Park to collect horse manure to use as fertilizer.

== New York City ==
In the early 1980s, the city planned to create low-income housing, but there was opposition from neighborhood activists and supporters. The Storefront for Art and Architecture created a group exhibition in 1984 to present alternative designs that would encompass the Garden of Eden into the public housing initiative. The initiative was unsuccessful. In 1985, Judge Vincent L. Broderick of Federal District Court ruled that the demolition could take place. The garden was demolished on January 8, 1986.

After Purple's "Garden of Eden" was destroyed, his friend, artist George Bliss, painted trails of purple footprints around the Lower East Side leading to the garden's former location. He is one of fifty subjects featured in Harvey Wang's New York, a book of photographs and brief biographies of notable or colorful New Yorkers.

== Death ==
Purple died on September 14, 2015, from a heart attack, aged 84, while bicycling across the Williamsburg Bridge.

== "Mr. Purple" Controversy ==
Mr. Purple, a rooftop bar on the Lower East Side's Hotel Indigo, cites the activist as the inspiration for its name. In the 14th floor lobby, a mural by former Fun Gallery artist Lee Quiñones features a snapshot of Adam Purple, as well as other pictures capturing the Lower East Side's formerly thriving punk-beat art and music scene.

The bar's opening in 2015 sparked outrage among the late activist's friends and followers, who say that the restaurant represents a contradiction to almost everything that the real Mr. Purple believed in and fought for. The photographer Harvey Wang, whose snapshot of Purple was featured in the mural without his permission, and New York bicycle designer and activist George Bliss were both appalled by the hotel's use of Purple's image in their marketing.

== See also ==
- Max Cantor
- Rivington School
