= George Bliss =

George Bliss may refer to:

- George Bliss (pedicab designer), American bicycle designer
- George William Bliss (1918–1978), American Pulitzer Prize-winning journalist
- George Bliss (Congressman) (1813–1868), U.S. Representative from Ohio
- George Bliss (Massachusetts), Massachusetts representative to the 1814 Hartford Convention
- George Bliss (Massachusetts politician) (1793–1873), American businessman and politician
- George N. Bliss (1837–1928), American soldier in the American Civil War
- George R. Bliss (1883–1974), American politician
- George Ripley Bliss (1816–1893), president of Bucknell University from 1857 to 1858 and 1871–72
- George Y. Bliss (1864–1924), bishop of the Episcopal Diocese of Vermont
