= Edward Bliss =

Medical missionary

Edward Lydston Bliss
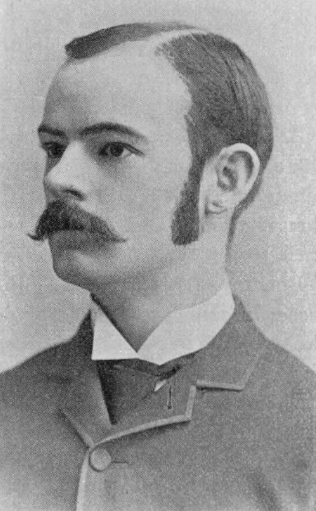
- Born: December 10, 1865; Newburyport, Massachusetts, US
- Died: January 22, 1960 (aged 94); Boston, Massachusetts, US
- Occupation: Medical missionary

Edward Lydston Bliss (Chinese: 福益华, December 10, 1865 – January 22, 1960) was a medical missionary who worked in China from 1892 to 1932. Coming from a religious family, Bliss originally sought to become a minister. After giving up these aspirations, he attended Yale University and became a teacher. He then went to medical school and began his career as a physician in China. During his time in Shaowu, located in the Fujian province of China, Bliss provided general care and also performed research on the rinderpest virus. He remained in China throughout many significant political conflicts throughout the early 1900s before returning to the United States in 1932. A biography of Bliss — Beyond the Stone Arches: An American Missionary Doctor in China, 1892–1932 (2001) — was written by his son, journalist Ed Bliss.

== Early life ==
=== Family ===
Edward Lydston Bliss was born December 10, 1865, in Newburyport, Massachusetts. He was the second child of Charles Henry Bliss, a wholesale dealer for Schleicher and Sohne needles, and Emily Lydston Bliss. One of seven children, Edward Bliss had three sisters — Clara, Marian and Mary — and three brothers — George, Charles and Will. The Blisses were a religious family that attended a Congregational church twice every Sunday. Charles Bliss served as superintendent of the Sunday school, which the children attended each week after morning service, and Emily Bliss worked on the missionary committee.

=== Ambitions ===
Bliss's religious upbringing influenced his early ambitions. He sought to become a minister and, in his early childhood, Bliss showed signs of this ambition. As early as age four he was found standing upon a tree stump, preaching the words, "Will 'ou, oh will 'ou be dood." At age six he signed a card at Sunday school, reading, "I, the undersigned, hope I have found Jesus to be my precious Saviour, and I promise with his help to live as His loving child and faithful servant all my life." Throughout his childhood and young adulthood Bliss remained active in the ministry. He spoke frequently at Christian Endeavor meetings and at adult services. He received overwhelming positive feedback for his preaching and therefore he believed ministry was indeed his calling. However, Bliss eventually realized that preaching was not his passion and he gave it up.

While Bliss's first goal was to become a minister, during his adolescence he also experienced influences for the missionary work he would eventually take on. In high school, Bliss's neighbor, General Adolphus Greely, left for the first of his Arctic expeditions. This inspired Bliss so that he read many exploration books, including Henry Morton Stanley's story of Daniel Livingstone in Africa.

=== Education ===
Bliss attended Yale University for his undergraduate education. While in school, he studied under famed professors such as Noah Porter, Edward Salisbury Dana and William Graham Sumner. Bliss took a variety of courses ranging from Latin and Greek to physics and chemistry. He was involved in the Pundits, a Yale literary society, and also enjoyed attending baseball and football games as often as he could. Bliss graduated from Yale in 1887 with a Bachelor of Arts degree in Latin and Greek.

=== Early work ===
After giving up his hopes of preaching, Bliss set his sights on becoming a teacher. After graduating from Yale he took a position as principal, sole teacher and janitor at the high school in Granby, Massachusetts. While teaching at Granby, Bliss discovered that teaching, like preaching, was not his passion. He then remembered the adventure stories he read when he was younger and concluded that he wanted to work abroad as a missionary. He said, "As soon as it was settled in my mind to become a missionary, I asked myself in what way I could best serve. The answer I thought was to become a doctor." Before Bliss could attend medical school, however, he wanted to repay a debt he had to his father. He took a new teaching position in Chicago at the Harvard School for Boys, where he stayed for one year.

=== Medical school ===
After completing a year of teaching work at the Harvard School for Boys, Bliss returned to Yale and began medical school. While there he worked as an assistant to Dr. Herbert Smith, studying water quality in New Haven. Bliss completed the three-year course of study in two years and graduated second in his class in June 1891.

== Missionary work, 1892–1932 ==
On April 23, 1891, Bliss wrote to the American Board of Commissioners for Foreign Missions, applying to be a medical missionary. Bliss requested commission to China reportedly because he believed in "the probability that, at no distant day, it will occupy the position of supreme influence among nations of the East." He received a post as the physician for the mission in Shaowu, China. Bliss departed from San Francisco aboard the SS China on September 27, 1892. On February 8, 1893, four months after departing the United States, Bliss reached Shaowu.

When Bliss arrived he immediately began studying the native dialect under the instruction of a teacher named Shi Xiansheng. Because many of the Chinese still utilized traditional medical practices, he did not have very many patients at first and he often studied the language for six and a half hours a day. Several months after his arrival, Bliss opened a small dispensary, equipped with medicine cabinets and a small operating table. He also planned to build a modern hospital as, at the time, the closest hospital was 150 miles away. Even then, Bliss had few patients, sometimes only one and at most five or six, in an entire morning. Finally, after breaking up a dogfight in the street using a long pole with a rag doused in ammonia on the end, Bliss received more patients. By April 1894, he was seeing 50 patients a day. This new workload created a need for a newer, larger dispensary, for which he requested funds from the American Board. The appeal was denied due to an American economic depression following the Panic of 1893. However, in 1896 building on a new dispensary began anyway, funded with Bliss's own money and "about 50 dollars or so" donated by friends. The First and Second Congregational Churches of Waterbury, Connecticut, contributed $180, making the building of a new hospital possible in 1897 as well. Building was completed in 1898. Bliss finally returned home on furlough in 1898. He returned to China in 1900, where he remained except for his furloughs in 1908 and 1916.

Bliss's work in Shaowu consisted of general medicine. He treated conditions such as leg ulcers, scabies, erysipelas, consumption and malaria, but was unable to perform major surgery. Furthermore, the size of the mission and his workload both increased over time. By 1920, the mission has expanded threefold and Bliss sometimes saw 100 patients per day. Therefore, Bliss needed assistance and starting in 1915, he requested the appointment of another physician. However, it was not until 1925 that the Missions Board answered his requests and assigned Dr. Walter Judd, a surgeon, to Shaowu.

=== Cooperative ===
It was Bliss's belief that in China "much of the disease is attributable to poverty" and that there was "a way to raise the living standards" of the Chinese. The "way" he was referring to was through a cooperative. He persuaded several Chinese Christians to form an association and buy a plot of land to use for agriculture. However, this project failed due to political instability in the region in the early 1900s and the resulting uncertainty of potential investors. Furthermore, many who had already invested demanded their money back because they were unsatisfied with the progress of the project. Although Bliss argued that it was long-term project, the investors persisted and the project was ended.

=== Rinderpest work ===
Bliss spent much of his time in China focusing on the immunization of cattle against rinderpest. Rinderpest is a virus of the Morbillivirus subgroup of the Paramyxovirus group, which also contains measles, influenza and polio. Bliss's battle against rinderpest began with his desire for milk, which he considered essential for good health. However, the Chinese did not raise cattle for dairy, but rather for plowing. Therefore, far less milk than was needed was available. When there was a rinderpest outbreak, this milk supply was depleted. Bliss raised his own cattle and goats in China and experimented with rinderpest prevention. He found that serums for immunization were available in Shanghai, but realized that the serum used for this was unattainable and unaffordable for farmers in regions like Shaowu. Bliss sought to find another method of immunization that was within the means of Shaowu. He built off of the discovery of Robert Koch, who found that if the bile from a rinderpest gall bladder were diluted with an equal amount of pure glycerin, it would lose its virulence and would be safe to inject after 10 days. This would provide immunity lasting several months. Bliss then deducted that if a cow was injected with a small quantity of rinderpest blood ten days after being injected with the bile, it would have immunity. He tested this and found he was correct. Bliss also discovered that the calves of immune cows had a temporary immunity that decreased as they aged. He found that if they were injected with a small amount of rinderpest blood within their first month of life, they would have immunity.

=== Impact of Chinese medicine ===
In his early years in Shaowu, Bliss considered one of his biggest difficulties to be competition with native medical practitioners. Traditional Chinese medicine in the early 1900s consisted of purely superstitious practices, such as charms and magic, or medicine practiced by the Chinese physician, who was usually unlicensed and gained his position through heredity. Rather than coming to the hospital at Shaowu for Western medical care, many Chinese still sought medical attention from such practitioners. Bliss witnessed practitioners who treated cancer by puncturing the skin with gold and silver needles, eyesores with bile from bear gallbladders, malarial fever with uncooked pears, rheumatism with snake meat, and many ailments with ginseng root.

=== Political context ===
==== Early anti-foreignism ====
In the early years of the Shaowu mission, foreign hostility was common. The first doctor who arrived, Dr. Philip Osgood, was stabbed in the foot by a spear. Another early missionary was shot in the shoulder. Furthermore, the Chinese would not sell the missionaries any land to build on for two years. However, over time, hostility decreased and the people of Shaowu became more open to Western medicine and Christianity. In fact, Bliss stated in a letter home, "You must remember that Shaowu people are different from many of the Chinese in their attitude toward foreigners. Never since I came here have I seen any indication that the people don't wish us here."

==== First Sino-Japanese War ====
In summer 1894, China and Japan went to war over control of Korea. A peace treating was signed on April 17, 1895, which required China to surrender the island of Formosa, present day Taiwan, and a section of Manchuria, the Liaodong Peninsula. There was then European interference, ending with new loans forced on China. This led to growing antiforeign feeling and the massacre of several missionaries in Gutian, just 200 miles from Shaowu. Therefore, Shaowu missionaries, including Bliss, were advised to retreat to Fuzhou, a port city with a large mission, for safety. Bliss remained at Fuzhou for two months until the danger passed.

==== Boxer Rebellion ====
While on furlough in 1900, Bliss received news of war in China. The Boxer Rebellion had just occurred. The conflict began as early as the late 19th century, when a rebel group in the Shandong Province began expressing resentment toward foreign missionaries. In 1897 they killed two German missionaries in the province. Anti-foreign sentiments increased and led to killing of foreigners and Chinese Christians. In fact, in the Shanxi province, more than 200 missionaries were killed. While, the Fujian province experienced less conflict than many other regions, there was still a significant impact and Bliss received notice that the Shaowu mission had undergone some damages. He returned to China in 1900 to find his house empty and stripped of all doors and window frames. The hospital was damaged, as well. Its doors and window frames were also stolen and the waiting rooms were destroyed. All of the medicines and Bliss's microscope were stolen from the dispensary. The missionaries rebuilt the damaged buildings that year.

==== Xinhai Revolution ====
The Xinhai Revolution or the Revolution of 1911 was a nationalistic movement against the Manchu or Qing dynasty. The impact of this movement was felt even in the Fujian province. Starting on October 31, 1911, and continuing until November 8, 1911, there was a widespread evacuation from Fuzhou. Women in children of the mission board in Fuzhou were evacuated to a foreign settlement outside of the city, near the United States consulate. Men remained in Fuzhou with protection from soldiers from the USS Bainbridge. The artillery battle between the rebels and the Manchus in Fuzhou began on November 9, 1911, and ended with a rebel victory. Rebel brigands also took control of the area just 25 miles south of Shaowu, where the missionaries now feared an impending outbreak. Bliss noted a "peculiar air of excitement" in the city, as if before a storm. The people of Shaowu were taking precautions, closing down and shuttering shops, as well as placing barricades in the streets. The imperial troops had left the city and there was now an almost complete breakdown of law enforcement. Bliss and the other missionaries began to take their own precautions, instituting a nightly watch. Then, on November 16, 1911, the Shaowu prefect declared the city's alignment with the Revolution and business returned to normal in the city. While Bliss believed there was no danger for the mission in Shaowu, the United States consul insisted that all Americans in the interior Fujian province retreat to Fuzhou.

Bliss remained in Fuzhou for over seven months. In this time period, the Qing dynasty ended and the Nationalist Party founded a new government, the Republic of China. Thousands of young men joined the defense of this government. In fact 300 boys quit the Shaowu middle school in order to join. Two of Bliss's students became medical officers in the Revolutionary Army. Instability persisted as changes in political power, including the change of the leader from Sun Yat-sen to Yuan Shikai and the change of the capital, occurred.

==== Warlord period ====
From 1916 to 1928 instability existed in the newly founded Republic of China. In this era, many different warlords assumed power throughout Chinese regions. Reunification only occurred when Jiang-Jieshi (Chiang Kai-shek) led the Northern Expedition of 1927, setting up a government in Nanking led by the Nationalist Party or Kuomintang. The instability associated with China's unification affected Shaowu, where opposing armies invaded, took over, and then withdrew many times. In Fujian province, Bliss and all other missionaries in the region were evacuated to the Fuzhou mission.

In this time period, anti-foreign feeling increased. British economic interests were heavily criticised and the United States perceived ambivalence toward Japanese attempts to gain Chinese territory were also flash points. Christianity again became a topic of protest. Two women working near Shaowu at an Anglican mission were kidnapped for ransom and then executed. Beginning in 1927 with the onset of the Chinese Civil War, there was a split between the Kuomintang and the Chinese Communist Party. Southern Communist Revolutionary forces captured both Bliss and his colleague Judd at separate times. In both cases, the men were released because the local people, who knew the men and their work, interceded on their behalf. By 1928 however the situation in Shaowu appeared relatively safe, as Jiang and the Nationalists had gained control of the province. However, within the next two years, Jieshi's control diminished as the Communist party gained power and set up their own state in Jiangxi. There were rumors that the communists would attack Fujian next so the women and children of the Shaowu mission were evacuated to Fuzhou. The Communist army finally invaded Shaowu in 1932, and would later set up a short lived Fujian People's Government. Bliss was forced to evacuate as the army reached city gates of Shaowu. He returned to America.

== Personal life ==
Bliss met Minnie May Bortz on January 26, 1901. Bortz was employed in a teaching position at Pagoda Anchorage, 10 to 12 miles from Fuzhou. Bliss proposed on July 23, 1902. The couple married on September 22, 1902, and remained together until Bliss's death. They had three children together — two daughters, Ruth and Beth, and a son, Edward Lydston Bliss Jr.

== Post-China life ==
After returning to the United States, Bliss and his wife lived in Oberlin, Ohio, a town with long-standing connections to the China mission movement. May Bortz Bliss developed pernicious anemia and required care from her husband. When Bliss was 81 years old, the couple moved to his hometown, Newburyport. They lived there until September 1958, when they moved to Boston to live with their oldest daughter, Ruth.

== Death ==
A malignant tumor was found in Bliss's throat in early 1959. He died in his sleep on January 22, 1960, at the age of 94. His wife, May Bortz Bliss, died seven years later in 1967.

== Legacy ==
Bliss considered some of his most important work in China to be his medical training of many young men. He usually taught them materia medica and anatomy for about two years. After this, most became "druggists" who ran their own dispensaries, or "barefoot doctors" who practiced medicine in the countryside. Some went on to Nanjing for additional study. Three of his students went on to study in medical school.

Bliss's legacy was also preserved through a book, Beyond the Stone Arches: An American Missionary Doctor in China, 1892–1932, written by his son, journalist Edward Bliss Jr., in 2001. Kirkus Reviews praised it as "a rousing account of a New England missionary doctor who worked for 40 years in China. … His exploits are chronicled from the last days of Imperial China through the various republics that arose in the wake of the 1911 revolution to the appearance of the Communists and the coming of WWII. Although it is common practice nowadays to view missionaries as agents of western imperialism, Bliss comes across well in his son's account—compassionate without being paternalistic, and instructive without being domineering … an exemplary man whose faith and devotion provide a refreshing tonic against the ambivalence and cynicism of later ages."
