= Ed Bliss =

American journalist

- Born: Edward Lydston Bliss, Jr. July 30, 1912; Fuzhou, China
- Died: November 25, 2002 (aged 90); Alexandria, Virginia
- Occupation: Journalist
- Spouse: Lois Arnette Bliss (1940–2001)

Edward Lydston Bliss, Jr. (July 30, 1912 – November 25, 2002) was an American broadcast journalist, news editor and educator. After 25 years at CBS News (1943–1968) as editor, copywriter and producer for Edward R. Murrow and Walter Cronkite, he founded the broadcast journalism program at American University.

== Biography ==
Ed Bliss was born July 30, 1912, in Fuzhou, China. His parents were missionaries; his father, Edward Lydston Bliss, was a physician, and his mother, May Bortz Bliss, was a teacher. Bliss lived in China until he was nine.

Bliss grew up in Massachusetts, attending the Northfield Mount Hermon School and editing the school paper. He planned to become a doctor like his father, but after receiving his bachelor of arts degree from Yale University in 1935 he set out on a career in journalism. He was hired as a reporter at the Bucyrus Telegraph-Forum in Bucyrus, Ohio, and developed his skills working for Rowland R. Peters, a former reporter for the Chicago Tribune. In 1936 Bliss joined the staff of The Columbus Citizen, the Scripps-Howard paper in Columbus, Ohio, where he worked as a reporter and state editor until 1943.

Bliss and Lois Arnette were married August 26, 1940, and they had two daughters.

Bliss was hired by CBS Radio in 1943. He got his start by chance. A friend Bliss was visiting in New York mentioned that Dallas Townsend—a writer who later became a CBS broadcaster—had enlisted in the Army, leaving a job opening at CBS. He applied and was handed thousands of words of copy from United Press, International News Service and Associated Press and told to write a five-minute newscast. It was a sort of test. He did it and he passed. CBS News chief Paul White gave him a midnight to 9 a.m. job writing news copy at CBS.

Bliss was considered one of the best of all news scriptwriters. During his 25 years at CBS radio and television, Bliss wrote and edited the news summary for Edward R. Murrow's broadcasts, worked on the investigative TV series CBS Reports with Fred W. Friendly, and was executive assistant to CBS News president Richard S. Salant. In 1963, Bliss became Walter Cronkite's news editor when the CBS Evening News became TV's first half-hour news broadcast. Bliss was news editor on the broadcast that announced the death of President John F. Kennedy; he had been monitoring the wire reports and gave Cronkite the news when he returned from lunch.

After Murrow died his widow, Janet Huntington Brewster, asked Bliss to edit a collection of his work. The book, In Search of Light: The Broadcasts of Edward R. Murrow, 1938–1961, was published in 1967.

Bliss left CBS in 1968 to found the broadcast journalism program at American University in Washington, D.C. His former students include Bob Edwards of NPR, Jackie Judd of ABC and Deborah Potter of CBS and CNN. His bestselling textbook, Writing News for Broadcast, was first published in 1971; Bliss also wrote the first comprehensive history of broadcast journalism, Now the News (1991).

He retired from teaching in 1977, and worked until 1997 as a consultant to broadcasting companies including the Canadian Broadcasting Corporation and CBS News.

Bliss wrote Beyond the Stone Arches (2001), a book about his father's 40 years in China, and For Love of Lois (2003), a book about his late wife's struggle with Alzheimer's disease that was published posthumously.

Bliss died November 25, 2002, in Alexandria, Virginia, of respiratory failure.

== Books ==
- 1967: In Search of Light; The Broadcasts of Edward R. Murrow, 1938–1961 (editor). New York: Knopf, 1967.
- 1969: Stylebook for Broadcast News. Washington, DC: American University, Dept. of Communication, 1969.
- 1971: Writing News for Broadcast (with John Meredith Patterson). New York: Columbia University Press, 1971. Second edition, fully revised (with John M. Patterson and Fred W. Friendly). New York: Columbia University Press, 1978. Third edition (with James L. Hoyt). New York: Columbia University Press, 1994. ISBN 9780231079730
- 1991: Now the News: The Story of Broadcast Journalism. New York: Columbia University Press, 1991. ISBN 9780231044035
- 2001: Beyond the Stone Arches: An American Medical Missionary in China, 1892–1932. New York: Wiley, 2001. ISBN 9780471397595
- 2003: For Love of Lois. New York: Fordham University Press, 2003. ISBN 9780823222650

== Honors ==
- 1984: Association for Education in Journalism and Mass Communication, Distinguished Broadcast Journalism Educator
- 1993: Paul White Award, Radio Television Digital News Association
- 1997: Distinguished Teaching in Journalism Award, Society of Professional Journalists
- 2002: Distinguished Service Award, Society for Professional Journalists Washington, D.C., Chapter

The Association for Education in Journalism and Mass Communication presents the annual Edward L. Bliss Award for Distinguished Broadcast Journalism Education. The Bliss Award recognizes an educator who has made significant and lasting contributions to the field of electronic journalism.
