= Richard L. Bliss =

American engineer

- Born: c. 1968; Washington, U.S.
- Occupation: Telecommunications engineer
- Known for: Arrest on charges of espionage while in Russia, subsequently released.

Richard L. Bliss is an American engineer and former employee of Qualcomm who was arrested in November 1997 while working within Russia on charges of espionage. Bliss, who was using a global positioning system that he had illegally brought into the country, was arrested by Russian authorities who believed that he was using the GPS to plot the location of Russian military bases. He was charged with espionage, a twenty-year prison sentence under Russian Criminal Code; however, mounting diplomatic pressure from the American government, including President Bill Clinton, then Vice-President Al Gore and U.S. Secretary of State Madeleine Albright, led to Bliss being released at first temporarily in order to visit his family for the Christmas holiday, and then permanently when the charges were dismissed.

== Incident ==
=== Background ===
Bliss, a resident of San Diego who grew up in Washington state, was working as a field technician for Qualcomm in late 1997, on a two-month stint in the area of Russian city Rostov-on-Don. It was his first trip overseas, having previously only travelled to Canada and Mexico. He was working, according to the Los Angeles Times, as "a supplier of communications equipment with Russian projects in Moscow, Rostov and Chelyabinsk." Several Russian firms were at the time employing American technicians to modernise antiquated telecommunications in remote areas of Russia. Qualcomm themselves stated following his detention that Bliss was "a Qualcomm employee installing a state-of-the art wireless local telephone system for the Rostov region."

=== Arrest ===
In an operation by the Russian Federal Security Service in Rostov on November 25, Bliss was plotted by tracking the global positioning systems and wireless telephone that he was using. He was one of six suspects targeted for the "use of various satellite equipment that was illegally brought into Russia," and was arrested along with one of his co-workers. He was charged under Article 276 of the Russian Criminal Code, it being claimed that he was using the GPS system, which he had illegally brought into the country, to plot the location of Russian military bases.

A week later, staff of the American Embassy in Moscow were permitted to attend to Bliss and offer him assistance. Qualcomm, based in San Diego, issued a statement denying that Bliss was involved in espionage, while the U.S. Embassy stated that "These are private-sector American citizens who have no connection to the U.S. government and are certainly not spies." Bliss' family also issued states, with his brother stating to the media that "We are deeply devastated by these absurd allegations."

=== Charge and conviction ===
Bliss was formally charged with espionage on December 6 after admitting bringing satellite equipment into the country illegally, though he denied all accusations of espionage. His defense lawyer, a Russian solicitor named Valery Petryayev, dismissed the charges as illegal, stating that "Subjectively, he [Bliss] couldn't and didn't know that he was violating any laws. He is a technician who was told to go there and do that. So he went to carry out some tests, and he had no idea he was violating any laws." Following growing American diplomatic pressure, the Russian government then chose to release Bliss the following day, December 7. He was required to remain in Rostov-on-Don, while American diplomats met with him and stated that he was in "good condition."

=== Diplomatic pressure and release ===
Meanwhile, American President Bill Clinton, then Vice-President Al Gore and U.S. Secretary of State Madeleine Albright all mounted pressure on the Russian government to release Bliss. On December 24 he was released from custody in order, according to Russian authorities, to return home for the Christmas holiday period. Bliss' lawyer, however, indicated to the media that the action was an admission by the Russian government that the arrest had been a mistake. The Russian government was criticised from within its own quarters also, with high-ranking executives of several telephone companies complaining that "We ask these Westerners to come here to help us develop our communications, and then we arrest them for doing so."

Bliss received a warm welcome on his return to San Diego. "Hundreds" of Qualcomm co-workers met him at the airport. A rally was held in his name at Qualcomm's headquarters. He was vocal about his innocence, stating that "my word is my bond." Initially, Bliss was required to return by January 11, 1998; however, on January 8 the American government announced that Bliss did not have to return to Russia.
