= Justice Bliss =

Justice Bliss may refer to:

- John Murray Bliss (1771–1834), associate justice of the Supreme Court of New Brunswick
- Philemon Bliss (1813–1889), chief justice of the Supreme Court of Dakota Territory, and associate justice of the Missouri Supreme Court
- William L. Bliss (1876–1969), associate justice of the Iowa Supreme Court
