= George Bliss (pedicab designer) =

American cycle designer

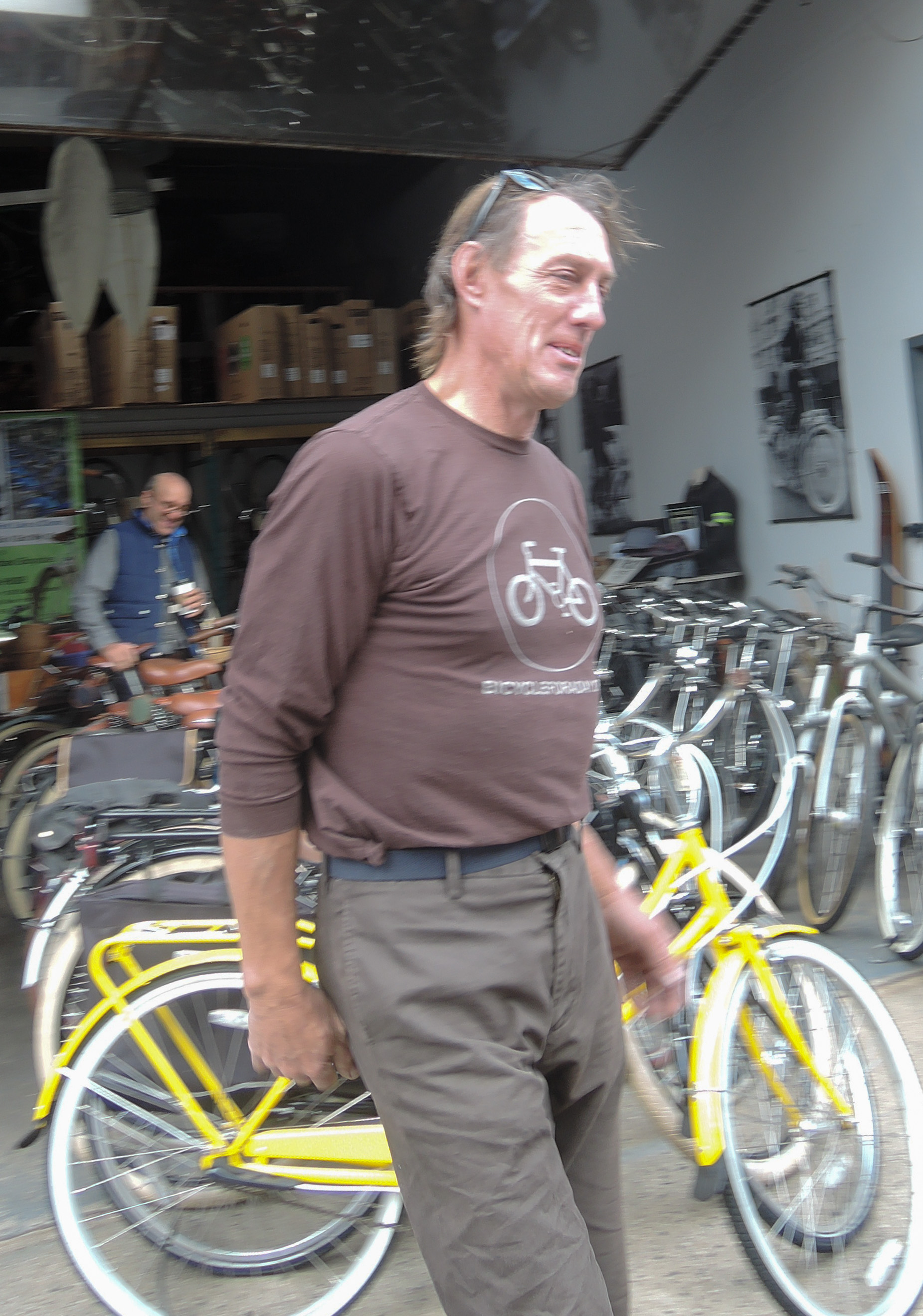
George Bliss speaks to a customer

George Bliss is a bicycle designer living, working and teaching in Manhattan, New York City. He has taught bike frame welding at Parsons The New School for Design.

Bliss coined the cycling term "Critical Mass" in the Ted White documentary Return of the Scorcher (1992) to describe the way cars, bicycles and pedestrians negotiate uncontrolled busy intersections in China.

He pioneered the niche bicycle industry in Manhattan, specifically custom designed cargo bikes including the "Dump Trike" and the smaller "Pick-Up Trike" and pedicabs. From 1995 to 2015, Bliss owned and operated a pedicab rental business (The Hub Station) in SoHo and then in the West Village. The business also sold and repaired recumbent bicycles, folding bicycles, electric bicycles, kick scooters and Xootrs with electric motors attached. Facing rent increases, and competition from the Citi Bike bike share, Bliss closed his retail location.

Later he opened a traditional bike store in the West Village, near the Hudson River Greenway, HUB, (Hudson Urban Bicycles).

== See also ==
- Adam Purple
- Cycling advocacy
- Max Cantor
- Rivington School
