= Stephen M. Bliss =

United States Army general

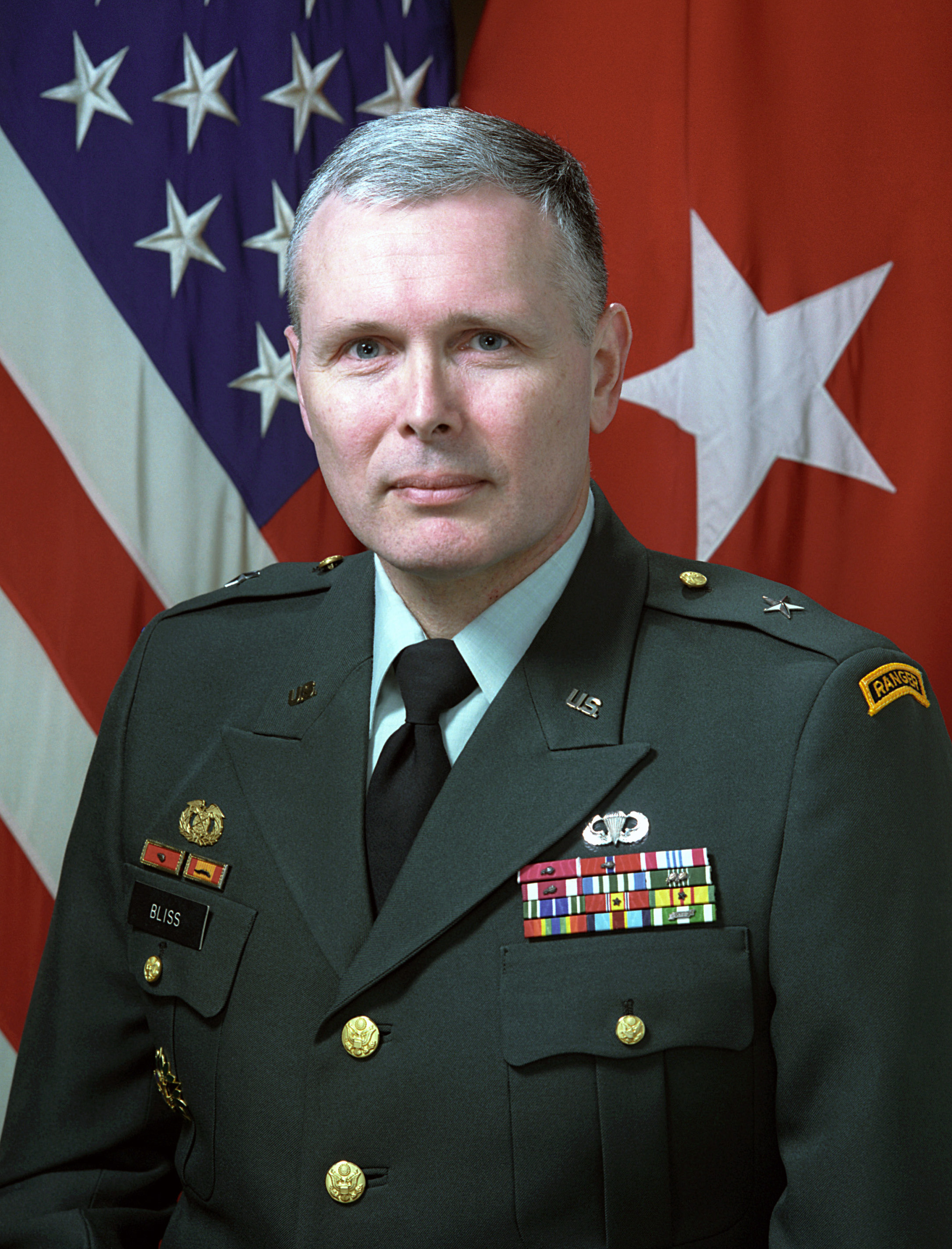
Brig. Gen. Stephen M. Bliss in 1993

Brigadier General Stephen Michael Bliss (born 28 January 1944) is a retired United States Army general who served as the president of the Army and Navy Academy and president of the Association of Military Colleges and Schools of the United States.

== Education ==
Born in Pennsylvania, Bliss was educated at The Hill School and was a 1965 graduate of the United States Military Academy. At West Point, he was on the varsity swimming and track teams.

He also holds an MBA from the University of Texas at Dallas and a master's degree from the Missouri University of Science and Technology in Petroleum Engineering.

== Military career ==
After graduating from West Point, Bliss joined the Quartermaster Corps. In 1967 he was sent to Vietnam, where he commanded various supply companies. He returned to the US for further education, including his degree in petroleum engineering, and then returned to Vietnam, first as an advisor to the South Vietnamese government on petroleum-related issues, and then in control of the United States Army Vietnam's fuel supply. After leaving Vietnam Bliss continued in various foreign and domestic posts, concluding his career with posts as director for energy & troop support, deputy chief of staff for logistics and then vice commander for the Army and Air Force Exchange Service.

He is a recipient of the Ranger tab and Parachutists badge.

== Army and Navy Academy ==
Bliss was the commander at the Army and Navy Academy, a military boarding school for students grade 7-12 located in Carlsbad, California, for twelve years. He retired in January 2014. A sexual molestation scandal involving administrator Jeffrey Barton began in 2013, leading to Bartons arrest and conviction on multiple counts. Bliss had himself ousted the previous chairman, Johnnie Crean, and the board of directors in 2003 after various accusations of misconduct.

The football stadium at the Army and Navy Academy which opened in 2013 is named for Bliss.
