= Brooks Woodland Preserve =

Protected area in Massachusetts, United States

Coordinates: 42°29′40″N 72°10′31″W

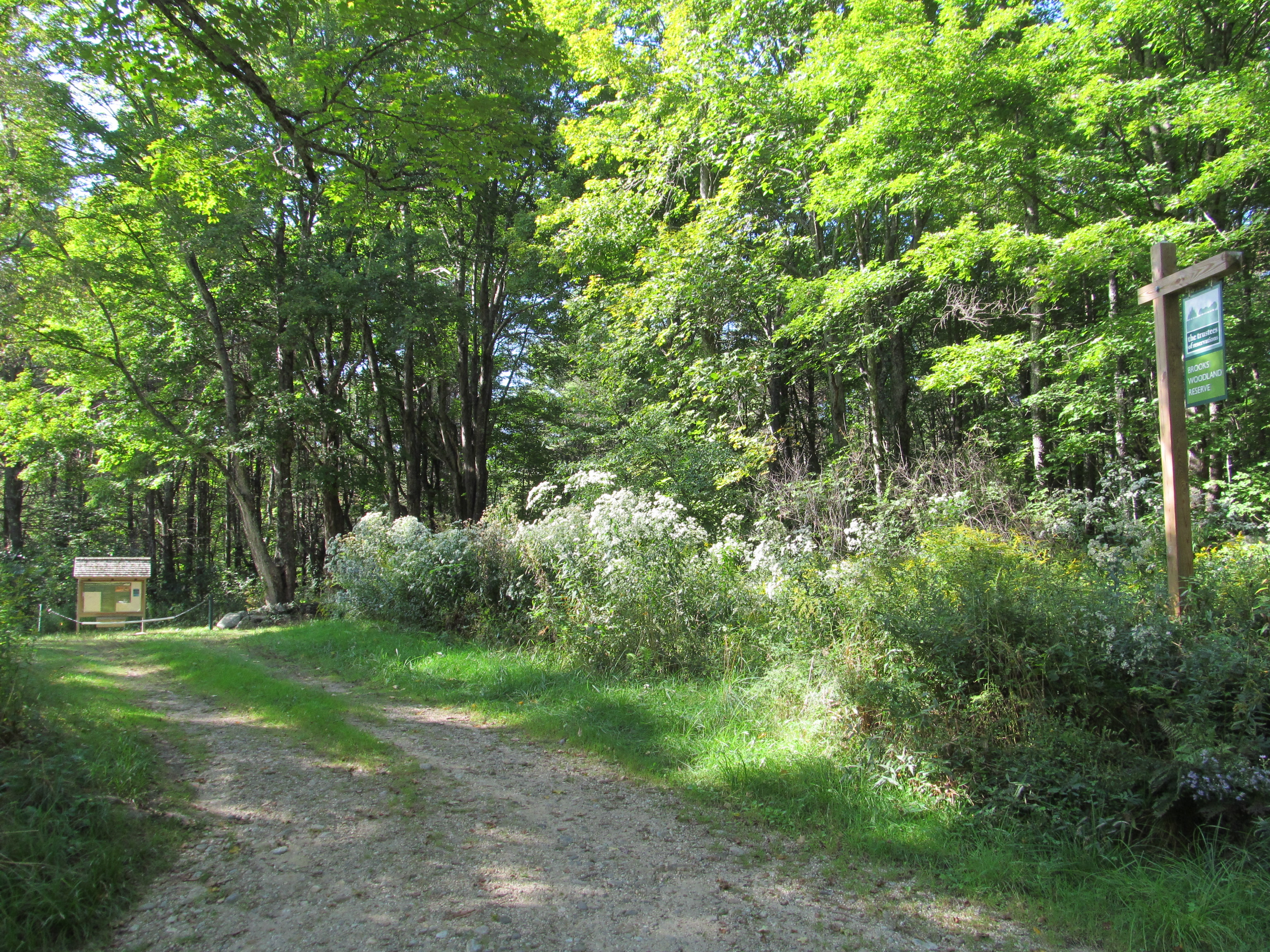
- Brooks Woodland Preserve
- Interactive map of Brooks Woodland Preserve
- Established: 1975
- Operator: The Trustees of Reservations
- Website: Brooks Woodland Preserve

The Brooks Woodland Preserve is a 558-acre (226 ha) open space preserve located in Petersham, Massachusetts. The property, named after industrialist and diplomat James Wilson Brooks, is managed by the land conservation non-profit organization The Trustees of Reservations and offers 13 miles (21 km) of trails and primitive woods roads available for hiking, horseback riding, and cross country skiing. Second growth forest, overgrown farm fields, granite ledges, historic stone walls, creeks, and rolling hills characterize the preserve.

The property is divided into three contiguous parcels, the Roaring Brook Tract, Swift River Tract, and Connor's Pond Tract. Trailheads are located off Massachusetts Route 32, East Street, Oliver Street and Quaker Drive in Petersham. A network of trails runs between the tracts and abutting conservation land. Moccasin Brook and the East Branch of the Swift River pass through the center of the preserve.

== History and conservation ==
The Preserve is named for Aaron Brooks, Jr's son, James Wilson Brooks, lawyer, diplomat, and co-founder of the United Shoe Machinery Company. Acquired in 1975, the property was formerly farmland, now overgrown with forest following the migration of agricultural interests to the midwest in the late 19th century. Cellar holes and old stone walls indicative of this former use dot the property.

The Brooks Woodland Preserve is part of an area of over 3,000 acres (12 km^{2}) of protected open space including The Trustees of the Reservation's North Common Meadow and Swift River Reservation, Harvard University's Harvard Forest, and the Massachusetts Audubon Society's Rutland Brook Sanctuary.
