= North Common Meadow =

Open space preserve in Petersham, Massachusetts

Coordinates: 42°29′40″N 72°10′31″W

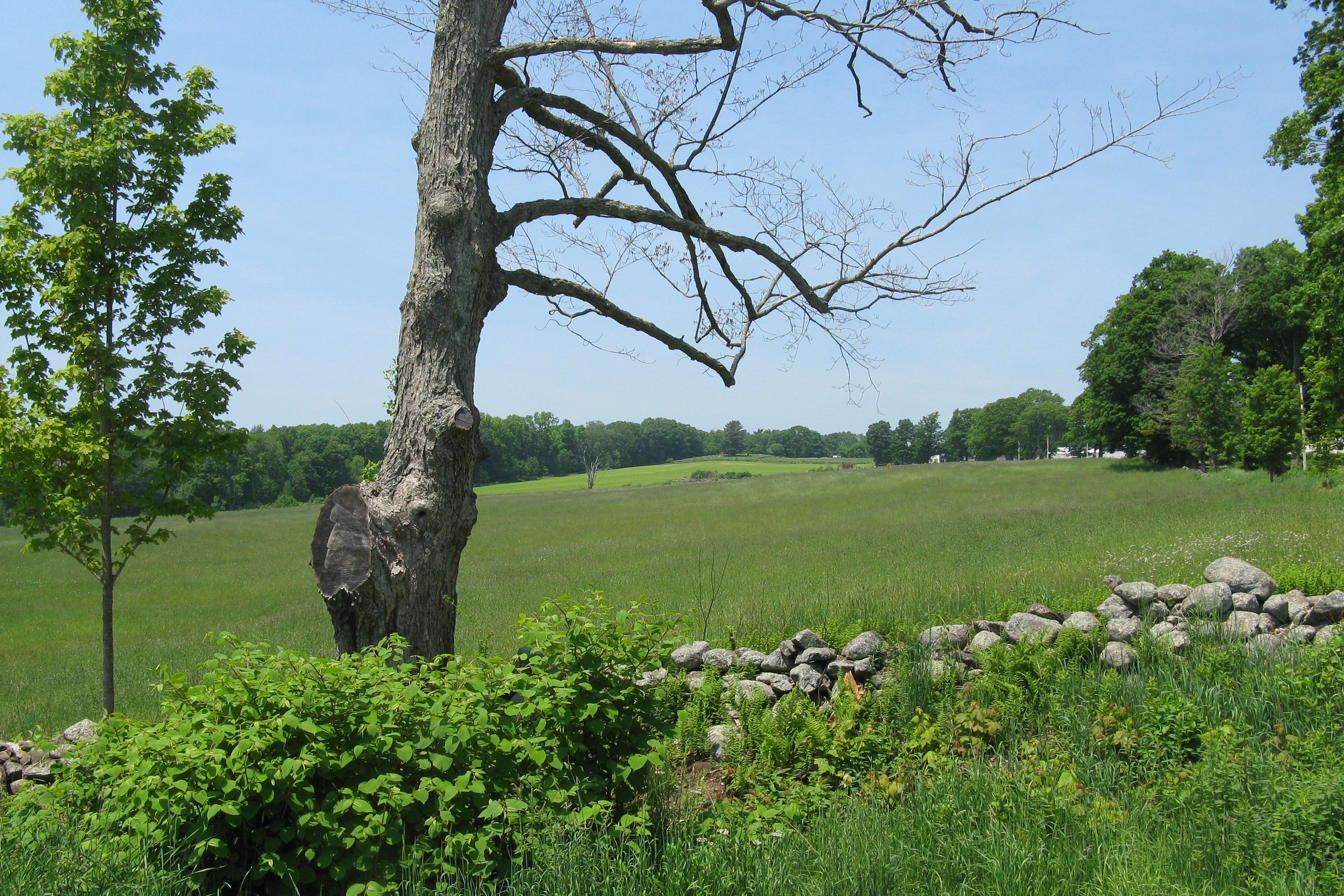
- North Common Meadow
- Interactive map of North Common Meadow
- Established: 1975
- Operator: The Trustees of Reservations
- Website: North Common Meadow

North Common Meadow is a 25-acre (10 ha) open space preserve in the town of Petersham, Massachusetts. The property, part of a larger, contiguous area of protected open space including Harvard Forest and The Trustees of Reservations' Brooks Woodland Preserve, is maintained as grassland in keeping with the town's rural character.

The preserve, acquired in 1975 by the land conservation non-profit organization The Trustees of Reservations, is suitable for hiking, horseback riding, picnicking, and cross country skiing; it is also maintained as habitat for ground nesting birds such as the bobolink, red-winged blackbird, and eastern meadowlark.

Access to North Common Meadow is located off Massachusetts Route 32 and East Street in Petersham center.

== History ==
The property was formerly pasture land; later, it was part of the golf course of the Nichewaug Inn. It was given to the Trustees of Reservations by an anonymous donor. North Common Meadow is part of the Petersham Common Historic District, placed on the National Register of Historic Places in 1982.
