= Jiquan Chen =

Landscape ecologist

Jiquan Chen is a landscape ecologist, primarily focused on nutrient flux, carbon cycling, bioenergy, and grassland ecology. He currently leads the LEES lab at Michigan State University.

== Early life and education ==
Chen was born in Shanxi, Northern China. He graduated from Inner Mongolia University in 1983 with an undergraduate degree in grassland plant ecology, received his MS in forest ecology in 1986 from the Chinese Academy of Science, and his PhD in ecosystem analysis from the University of Washington in 1991. From 1992 to 1993 he completed postdocorate training in stream ecology and ecosystem management, also at the University of Washington.

== Career ==
Chen has worked as an ecologist, professor, author, and editor. His research is focused on ecosystem nutrient flux, fragmented landscapes, agriculture, grasslands, hydrology, global change, and bioenergy. In 1999, he was a Bullard Fellow at Harvard University Forest. He is the chief scientist and founder of the US-China Carbon Consortium. From 1993 to 2001, he was a faculty member at Michigan Tech University, and from 2001 to 2014 he was a faculty member at the University of Toledo. In 2014, he became a professor of geography at Michigan State University, where he currently directs the Landscape Ecology and Ecosystem Science lab (LEES). This lab focuses on water and carbon cycles across ecosystems, bioenergy resources, and how human activities contribute to climate change feedback cycles. Chen is an Editor-in-Chief for Ecological Processes. He has been an author on over 300 papers, and 11 books. His research has been funded by NASA and the NSF.

== Awards and recognition ==
Chen was elected an AAAS Fellow in 2011 and an ESA Fellow in 2014

== Notable publications ==
=== Books ===
- Gutman, G., J. Chen, G., Henebry(Eds.). 2020. Landscape Dynamics of Drylands across Greater Central Asia: People, Societies, and Ecosystems.
- Chen, J.2020. Biophysical Models and Applications in Ecosystem Analysis. HEP and MSU Press. (to be published in 2020).
- Bhardwaj, A. K., Zenone, T., and Chen, J.(Eds.) 2015. Sustainable Biofuels: An Ecological Assessment of Future Energy. De Gruyter, 346pp.
- Chen, J., Wan, S., Henebry, G., Qi, J., Gutman, G., Sun, G., and Kappas, M. (Eds.) 2013. Dryland East Asia (DEA): Land Dynamics Amid Social And Climate Change. HEP and De Gruyter, 470 pp.
- Chen, J.and Yang, S. (Eds.) 2014. Methods for Terrestrial Ecosystem Studies. Higher Education Press 362 pp.
- Li, C., Lafortezza, R., and Chen, J.(Eds.) 2010. Landscape Ecology in Forest Management and Conservation. HEP and Springer, 424pp.
- Lafortezza, R., Chen, J., Sanesi, G., and Crow, T. R. (Eds.) 2008. Patterns and Processes in Forest Landscapes. Springer-Verlag. 425pp.
- Chen, J., Liu, S., Lucas, R., Sun, P., Lafortezza, R., and Delp Taylor, L. (Eds.) 2008. Landscape Ecology and Forest Management: challenges and solutions. The Proceedings of the International Conference of IUFRO8.01.02. Chengdu, P.R. China. 192pp.
- Gu, B., Wu, J., Wu, Y., Dong, Q., and Chen, J.(Eds.) 2008. Green Career –poem and essay collection written by Chinese Ecologists overseas. Higher Education Press, 171pp.

=== Papers ===
- Disturbances and structural development of natural forest ecosystems with silvicultural implications, using Douglas-fir forests as an example. JF Franklin, TA Spies, R Van Pelt, AB Carey, DA Thornburgh, DR Berg, Forest ecology and management 155 (1–3), 399–423
- Recent decline in the global land evapotranspiration trend due to limited moisture supply. M Jung, M Reichstein, P Ciais, SI Seneviratne, J Sheffield, ML Goulden, Nature 467 (7318), 951–954
- Edge influence on forest structure and composition in fragmented landscapes. KA Harper, SE Macdonald, PJ Burton, J Chen, KD Brosofske, Conservation biology 19 (3), 768–782
- Microclimate in forest ecosystem and landscape ecology: variations in local climate can be used to monitor and compare the effects of different management regimes. J Chen, SC Saunders, TR Crow, RJ Naiman, KD Brosofske, GD Mroz, BioScience 49 (4), 288–297
- Global patterns of land‐atmosphere fluxes of carbon dioxide, latent heat, and sensible heat derived from eddy covariance, satellite, and meteorological observations, M Jung, M Reichstein, HA Margolis, A Cescatti, AD Richardson, MA Arain, Journal of Geophysical Research: Biogeosciences 116 (G3)
- Growing‐season micro climatic gradients from clear cut edges into old‐growth Douglas‐fir forests, J Chen, JF Franklin, TA Spies Ecological Applications 5 (1), 74–86
- Modeling and measuring the effects of disturbance history and climate on carbon and water budgets in evergreen needleaf forests, JPS Thornton, P.E., B.E. Law, H.L. Gholz, K.L. Clark, Agricultural and Forest Meteorology 113, 185–222
- Vegetation responses to edge environments in old‐growth Douglas‐fir forests, J Chen, JF Franklin, TA Spies, Ecological applications 2 (4), 387–396
- Contrasting micro climates among clearcut, edge, and interior of old-growth Douglas-fir forest, J Chen, JF Franklin, TA Spies, Agricultural and forest meteorology 63 (3–4), 219–237
- Estimating above ground biomass using Landsat 7 ETM+ data across a managed landscape in northern Wisconsin, USA, D Zheng, J Rademacher, J Chen, T Crow, M Bresee, J Le Moine, SR Ryu, Remote sensing of environment 93 (3), 402–411
- Harvesting effects on micro climatic gradients from small streams to uplands in western Washington, KD Brosofske, J Chen, RJ Naiman, JF Franklin, Ecological applications 7 (4), 1188–1200

== Personal life ==
Chen enjoys practicing Tai Chi and Buddhist Meditation in his free time. His parents were farmers.
