= Danielle Ignace =

- Education: University of Wisconsin-Madison (B.S.), University of Arizona (M.S.), University of Arizona (P.h.D)
- Occupations: Ecophysiologist, Global Change Biologist, Forester, Science Communicator
- Website: www.ignacelab.com

Danielle Ignace is an ecophysiologist and an associate professor at University of Minnesota at the Department of Forest Resources and an affiliate at the University of British Columbia She also is a research associate at the Harvard Forest. Ignace is an enrolled member of the Coeur d'Alene Reservation and an advocate for marginalized communities in STEM.

== Early life ==
Ignace grew up in Milwaukee with her mother, an enrolled member of the Menominee tribe and her father is an enrolled member of the Coeur d'Alene Reservation, where Ignace is also an enrolled member. She has two brothers.

== Education ==
Ignace attended University of Wisconsin–Madison and obtained a B.S. in Zoology and Environmental Studies. She then attended University of Arizona to get her M.S. and P.h.D in Ecology and Evolutionary Biology. This is where she studied desert grasses' response to precipitation. She nearly went to medical school, but was turned towards her current career path.

== Career ==
Ignace earned an Ecological Society of America (ESA) Excellence in Ecology Scholarship (EEE) in 2023. She works at University of British Columbia as an associate professor. She is also a research associate at the Harvard Forest and previously worked at Smith College. Her research is led by an interest in the effects of global climate change on Indigenous communities.

At Smith College, Ignace studied eastern hemlock ecosystems that are transitioning to black birch ecosystems due to invasive pests. Her research examines the effects of invasive species and major climate changes, such as drought and altered precipitation, on ecosystems. She focuses on ecosystems in transition, particularly those losing biodiversity. A key aspect of her research is understanding carbon dynamics to determine whether these ecosystems will act as sources or sinks for carbon dioxide, which has implications for global warming. For instance, in hemlock groves, leaf litter is slow to decompose and therefore better stores carbon unlike black birch which decomposes quickly and releases carbon into the atmosphere.

Ignace explores her interest in advocacy by being on the board of the BC Conservation Fund for the BC Parks Foundation. As well a strategic advisor for the Silviculture Innovation Program, an elected officer on the Traditional ecological knowledge section of the Ecological Society of America, and the chair for the Equity, Diversity, and Inclusion committee for the American Society of Plant Biologists. She was an associate editor of the journal Elementa: Science of the Anthropocene.

== Selected publications ==
- Ignace, D.D., Huxman, T.E., Weltzin, J.F. et al. Leaf gas exchange and water status responses of a native and non-native grass to precipitation across contrasting soil surfaces in the Sonoran Desert. Oecologia 152, 401–413 (2007). https://doi.org/10.1007/s00442-007-0670-x
- Ignace, D.D., Dodson, S.I. & Kashian, D.R. Identification of the critical timing of sex determination in Daphnia magna (Crustacea, Branchiopoda) for use in toxicological studies. Hydrobiologia 668, 117–123 (2011). https://doi.org/10.1007/s10750-010-0534-y
- Ignace, D.D. and Chesson, P. (2014), Removing an invader: evidence for forces reassembling a Chihuahuan Desert ecosystem. Ecology, 95: 3203-3212. https://doi.org/10.1890/14-0456.1
- Ignace DD (2019) Determinants of temperature sensitivity of soil respiration with the decline of a foundation species. PLoS ONE 14(10): e0223566. https://doi.org/10.1371/journal.pone.0223566
