= Swift River Reservation =

Protected landscape in Massachusetts

Coordinates: 42°26′47.9″N 72°10′50.9″W

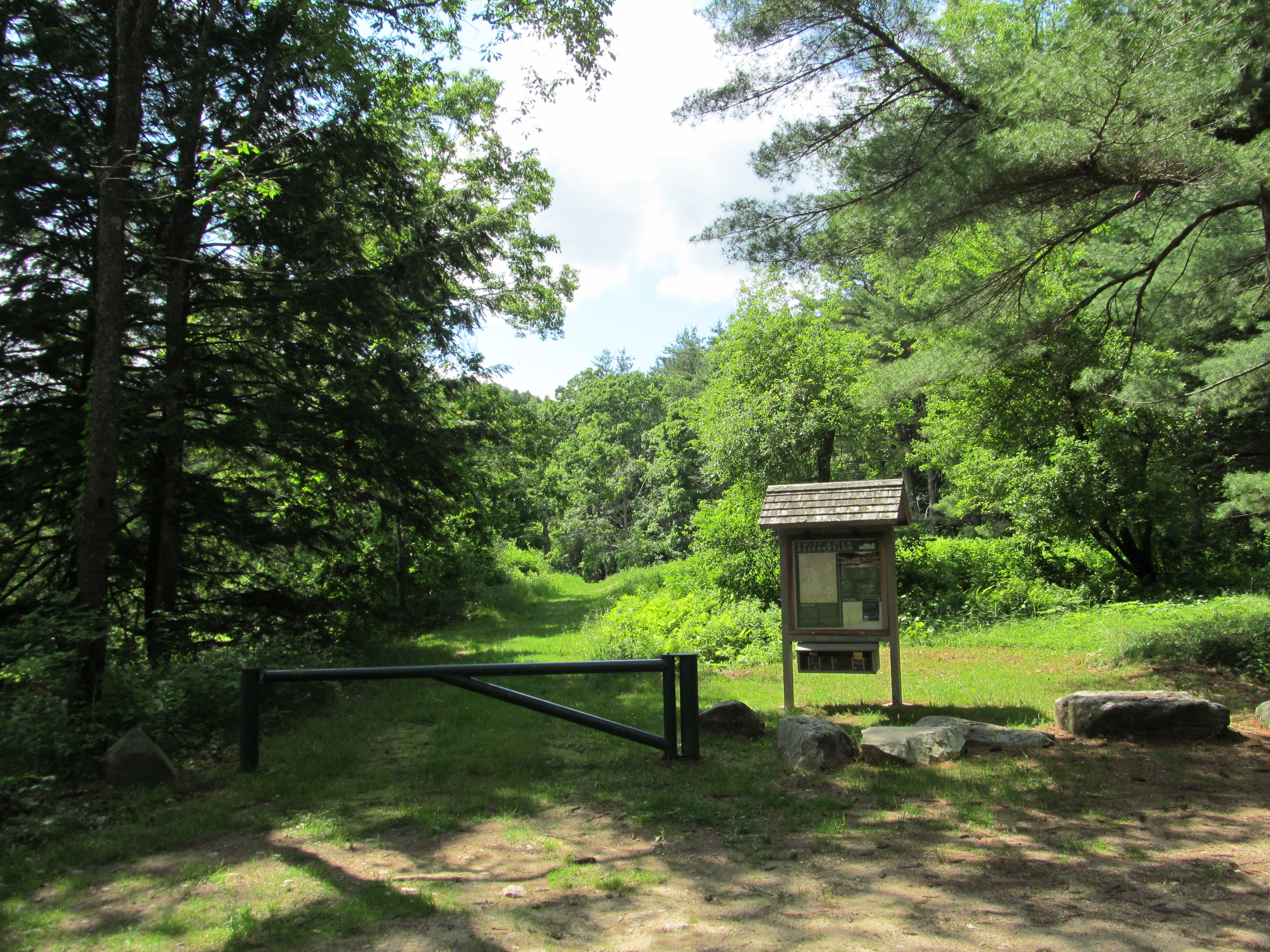
- Swift River Reservation
- Interactive map of Swift River Reservation
- Established: 1983
- Operator: The Trustees of Reservations
- Website: Swift River Reservation

The Swift River Reservation is a 439-acre (178 ha) open space preserve located in Petersham, Massachusetts, United States. The property, named after the East Branch of the Swift River (a tributary of the Ware River), is managed by the land conservation non-profit organization The Trustees of Reservations and offers 7 miles (11 km) of trails available for hiking, horseback riding, mountain biking, and cross country skiing. Ledges, river corridor, woodlands, scenic vistas, and wetlands characterize the preserve.

The property is divided into three contiguous parcels, the Slab City Tract, Davis Tract, and Nichewaug Tract. Trailheads are located off Massachusetts Route 32/122, Glen Valley Road, and Nichewaug Road in Petersham. A network of trails runs between the Davis and Nichewaug tracts; the Slab City tract is not connected to the other two parcels via trail. The East Branch of the Swift River passes through the Slab City and Nichewaug tracts.

== History and Conservation ==
The reservation was farmland until the late 1880s. Small scale mill industries also stripped the area of trees. When farming migrated to the Midwest and the industries closed, the land became wooded again. The property contains cellar hole remains of farmsteads. Scenic vistas are located on the Slab City and Nichewaug tracts.

The tracts were acquired in 1983 and 1985 by the Trustees of Reservations.

The Swift River Reservation is part of a larger area of protected open space including the Trustees of Reservations' Brooks Woodland Preserve, Harvard University's Harvard Forest, and state owned land.
