= Harvard School for Boys =

Harvard School for Boys may refer to:

- Harvard School for Boys, defunct boys' school in Chicago (1865–2003)
- Harvard-Westlake School, school in Los Angeles (1900–present)
