= Von Ogden Vogt =

Von Ogden Vogt (February 25, 1879 – August 2, 1964) was a Unitarian minister. His theory of worship influenced the shape of mainline Protestant worship in the early 20th century, and he was an authority on the theory of worship and an influential voice in the gothic revival in church architecture in the mid-20th century, a professor at Chicago Theological Seminary and Beloit College. From 1925 to 1944 he was minister of The First Unitarian Church of Chicago. He served on the 1937 hymnal commission that produced a common hymnal for Unitarians and Universalists prior to their merger into the Unitarian Universalist Association.

His UUA file is held at Andover-Harvard Theological Library.

His undergraduate college education was at Beloit College. He earned a Master of Arts degree in 1909 from Yale University. He graduated with the B D, magna cum laude, in 1911 from Yale Divinity School.
