= First Unitarian Church of Chicago =

Coordinates: 41°47′30.0″N 87°35′49.0″W

The First Unitarian Church of Chicago
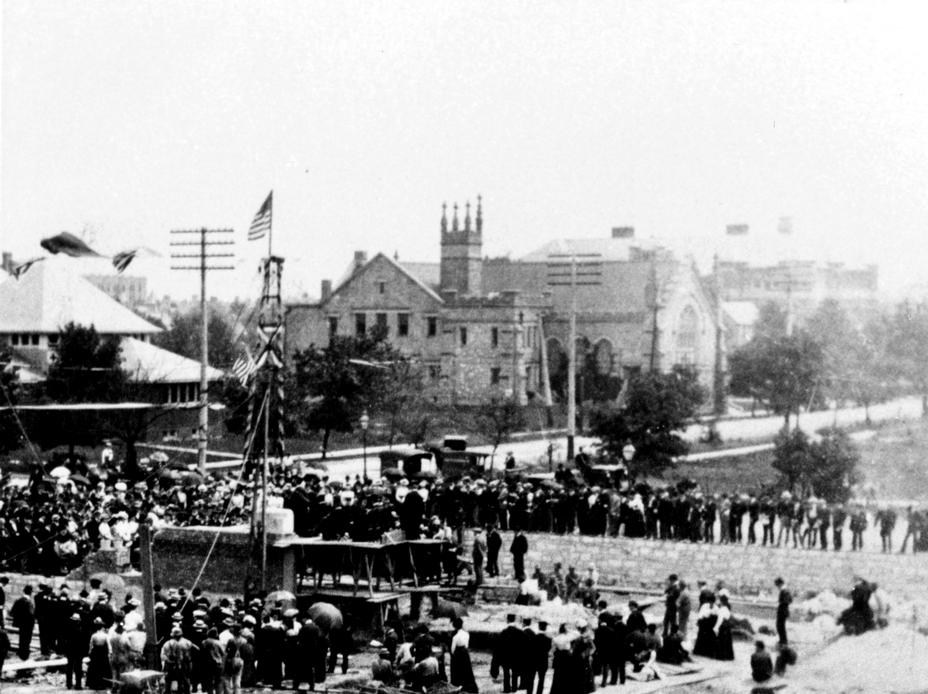
- Hull Chapel in 1901 prior to the construction of the 1931 sanctuary
- The First Unitarian Church of Chicago
- Location: 5650 South Woodlawn Avenue; Hyde Park, Chicago, Illinois
- Country: United States
- Denomination: Unitarian Universalism
- Website: First Unitarian Church of Chicago

History
- Status: Church
- Founded: 1836

Architecture
- Functional status: Active
- Architect: Dennison Hull
- Architectural type: Perpendicular Gothic
- Groundbreaking: 1929
- Completed: 1931

The First Unitarian Church of Chicago is a Unitarian Universalist ("UU") church in Chicago, Illinois. Unitarians do not have a common creed and include people with a wide variety of personal beliefs, and include atheists, agnostics, deists, monotheists, pantheists, polytheists, pagans, as well as other belief systems.

One of the oldest churches in Chicago, First Unitarian Chicago was founded July 29, 1836 and is currently located at 5650 S. Woodlawn Avenue. Its founding was in part the result of a small group of Chicago Unitarians with the minister Charles Follen. Its first building was constructed in 1841 on what is now the site of the Picasso statue in Daley Plaza. The building, twice enlarged before it burned down, held the first church bell in Chicago placed there in January 1845.

In June 1862 the building was lost to fire, the congregation temporarily worshiped in St. Paul's Universalist Church until the new church building was completed and the first service was help November 22, 1863.

In 1873 a new church building was constructed at the corner of 23rd and Michigan. And in 1897 a mission chapel to the University of Chicago was built at 57th and Woodlawn in Hyde Park, Chicago. In 1909, the 23rd ave building was sold and the congregation moved to the university chapel.

A new edifice was built in 1925 in an English perpendicular Gothic style, a gift of church member and Illinois US Representative Morton D. Hull whose ashes now rest in the crypt below the building. A crypt for cinerary urns (a Columbarium) below the nave was the first crypt for ashes in the city. It was designed intentionally to serve the neighborhood and city, not just members of the church.

The 1931 building had a belltower featuring multiple floors, on top of which was added a steeple. The steeple was repaired in the 1990s, and removed in 2002 due to failing structure. This was not the first time the tower of a church building had incurred a cost to the society. After the Church of the Messiah was built in 1864, the tower on that building settled. As a result, it had to be taken down and entirely rebuilt along with the front of the church at a cost of $15,000.

In 1956, the Chicago Children's Choir (now Uniting Voices Chicago) was founded in the church by assistant minister Christopher Moore.

== Notable members ==
- James Luther Adams
- Timuel Black
- Ralph Wendell Burhoe (interred in the crypt)
- Dolores Cross
- Hans Gustav Güterbock (interred in the crypt)
- John Charles Haines
- Morton D. Hull (interred in the crypt)
- Frank Knight (interred in the crypt)
- Horatio G. Loomis
- Bradford Lyttle
- Shailer Mathews (interred in the crypt)
- Ebenezer Peck
- Alex Poinsett
- Toni Preckwinkle
- Curtis W. Reese (interred in the crypt)
- Von Ogden Vogt (interred in the crypt)
- Y. C. Wong (interred in the crypt)

== Senior ministers ==
- 1839–1844. Joseph Harrington Jr.
- 1846–1849. William Adam (minister)
- 1849–1857. Rush Rhees Shippen
- 1857–1859. George F. Noyes
- 1861–1864 Charles B. Thomas
- 1866–1874. Robert Laird Collier
- 1876–1881. Brooke Herford
- 1883–1891. David Utter
- 1891–1901. William Wallace Fenn
- 1901–1923. William Hansen Pulsford
- 1925–1944. Von Ogden Vogt
- 1944–1962. Leslie T. Pennington
- 1963–1968. Jack Kent
- 1968–1969. John Robinson (interim)
- 1969–1978. Jack Mendelsohn
- 1980–1986. Duke Gray
- 1988–1991. Tom Chulak
- 1993–1998. Terasa Cooley
- 1999–2011. Nina Grey
- 2011–2013. Barbara Gadon (interim)
- 2013–2021. Teresa and David Schwartz
- 2023–2026. David Messner

=== Ministers-at-large ===
- 1860–1863. Robert Collyer (minister-at-large)
- George Sikes (minister-at-large)
- 1977–present. W. David Arksey (minister-at-large)
