= Ellen Thayer Fisher =

American botanical illustrator

- Born: Ellen Bowditch Thayer; April 16, 1847; Boston, Massachusetts
- Died: October 15, 1911 (aged 64); Lanesboro, Massachusetts
- Known for: Botanical painter
- Spouse: Edward Thornton Fisher (m. 1869)

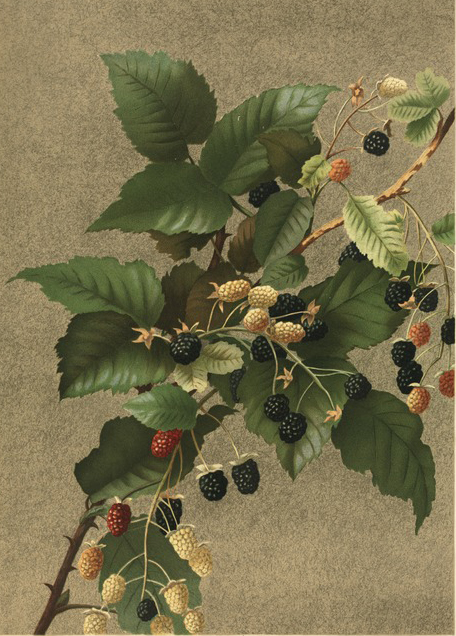
Blackberries by Ellen Thayer Fisher

Ellen "Nelly" Thayer Fisher (April 16, 1847 – October 15, 1911) was an American botanical illustrator. Fisher exhibited her paintings at the National Academy of Design and other exhibitions. She was an active contributor to the exhibitions of the American Watercolor Society, beginning in 1872. In addition to being shown in galleries and exhibitions, her paintings of flora and fauna were widely reproduced as chromolithographs by Boston publisher Louis Prang.

== Personal life ==
Ellen Bowditch Thayer was born on April 16, 1847, to William Henry Thayer and Ellen Handerson Thayer of Boston, Massachusetts. Her father served as a surgeon with the New Hampshire Volunteers in the American Civil War. Her younger brother, Abbott Handerson Thayer became an artist and naturalist. After living in Boston, the family moved to Woodstock, Vermont, and in 1855 to Keene, New Hampshire. By 1867, they moved to Brooklyn, New York.

Ellen was married on June 30, 1869, to Edward Thornton Fisher (December 16, 1836 – June 4, 1917) They lived in Brooklyn, New York, and Ellen may also have rented a studio in New York City. They had seven children, Faith (later Mrs. William Wallace Fenn), Henry, Edward, Richard, Margaret, Reginald, and Eleanor.

Ellen Thayer Fisher died on October 15, 1911, in Lanesboro, Massachusetts.

== Artwork ==
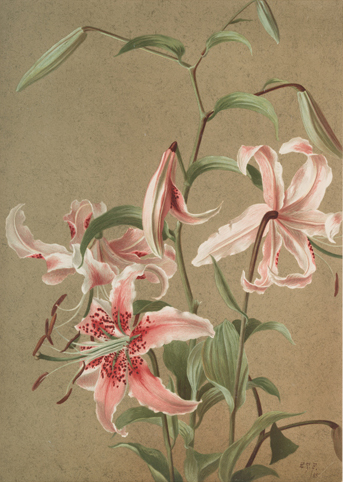
Japan Lily

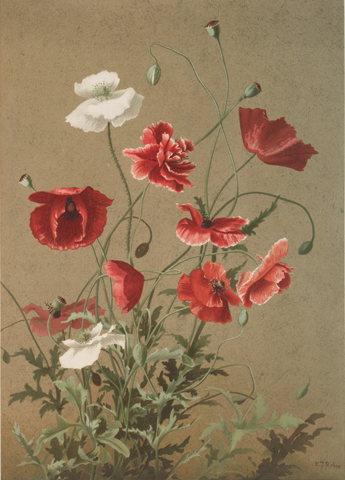
Poppies

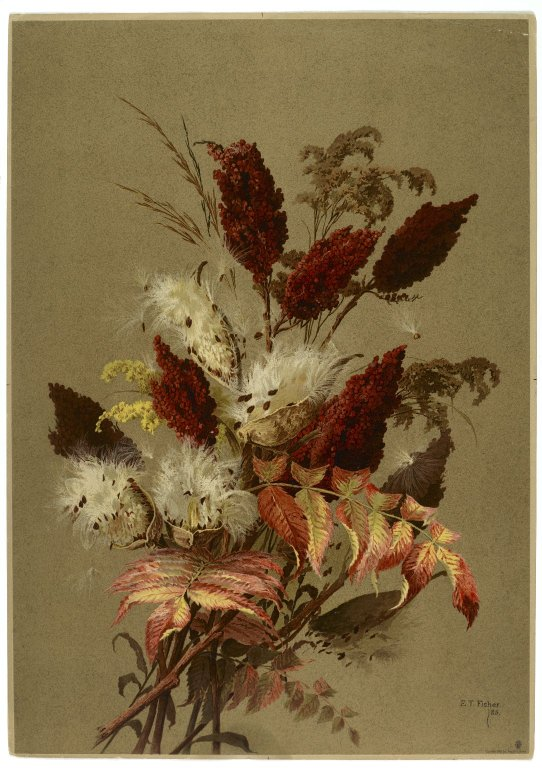
Sumac and Milkweed

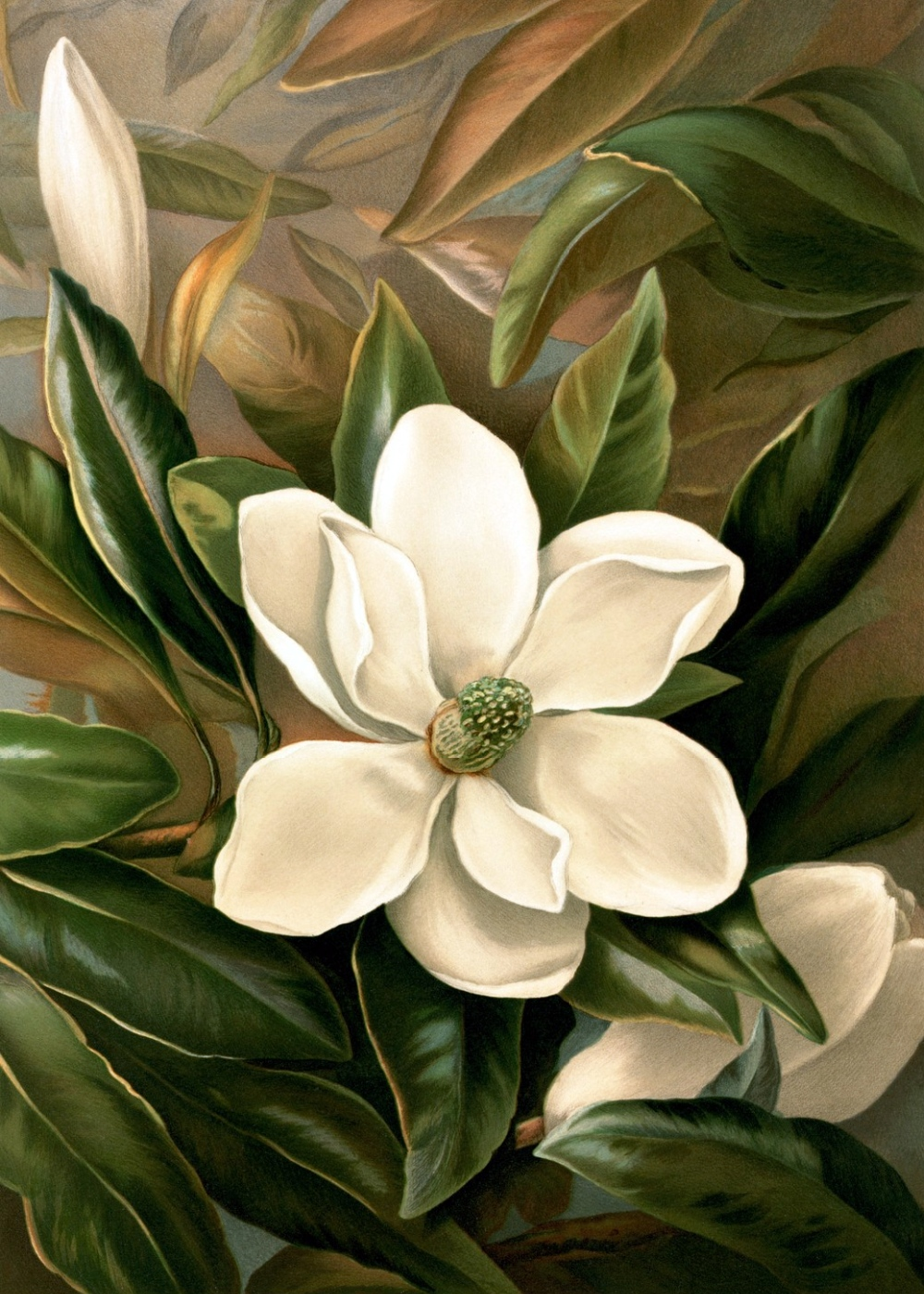
Magnolia grandiflora

Ellen was likely self-taught, but may have learned drawing and painting techniques from her younger brother, artist Abbott Handerson Thayer. Denied access to nude models because of her gender, she focused on flora and fauna. She is best known for her watercolors.

Fisher was an active participant both before and after her marriage at the Brooklyn Art Association (1867–1884), the National Academy of Design exhibitions (1868–1880), the Pennsylvania Academy (1877, 1885) and the American Water Color Society (1886).

Between 1884 and 1887, Fisher worked for Louis Prang, whose company used her works and those of many other female artists to produce chromolithograph greeting cards. She was one of the illustrators for Alice Ward Bailey's Flower fancies (1889), described as an "exquisite volume", "charming alike to the eye and to the mind".

Fisher exhibited her work at the 1893 World's Columbian Exposition in Chicago, Illinois.

== Legacy ==
Her work is included in collections including the Heckscher Museum of Art, New York Public Library, the Boston Public Library, the Huntington Library and the Sellars Collection of Art by American Women in Indianapolis. Her work Poppies was included in the special exhibition Lines of Thought: American Works on Paper from a Private Collection (1996–1997) at the Florence Griswold Museum, Old Lyme, Connecticut. Her work Nesting Bird in Apple Blossoms is part of the United States Department of State cultural exchange program and was exhibited in Luxembourg in 2001. Her work Lady Slipper (1878) appeared in the 2015–2016 exhibition Go Girl at the Heckscher Museum of Art.
