= Richard Thornton Fisher =

American forester and educator (1876–1934)

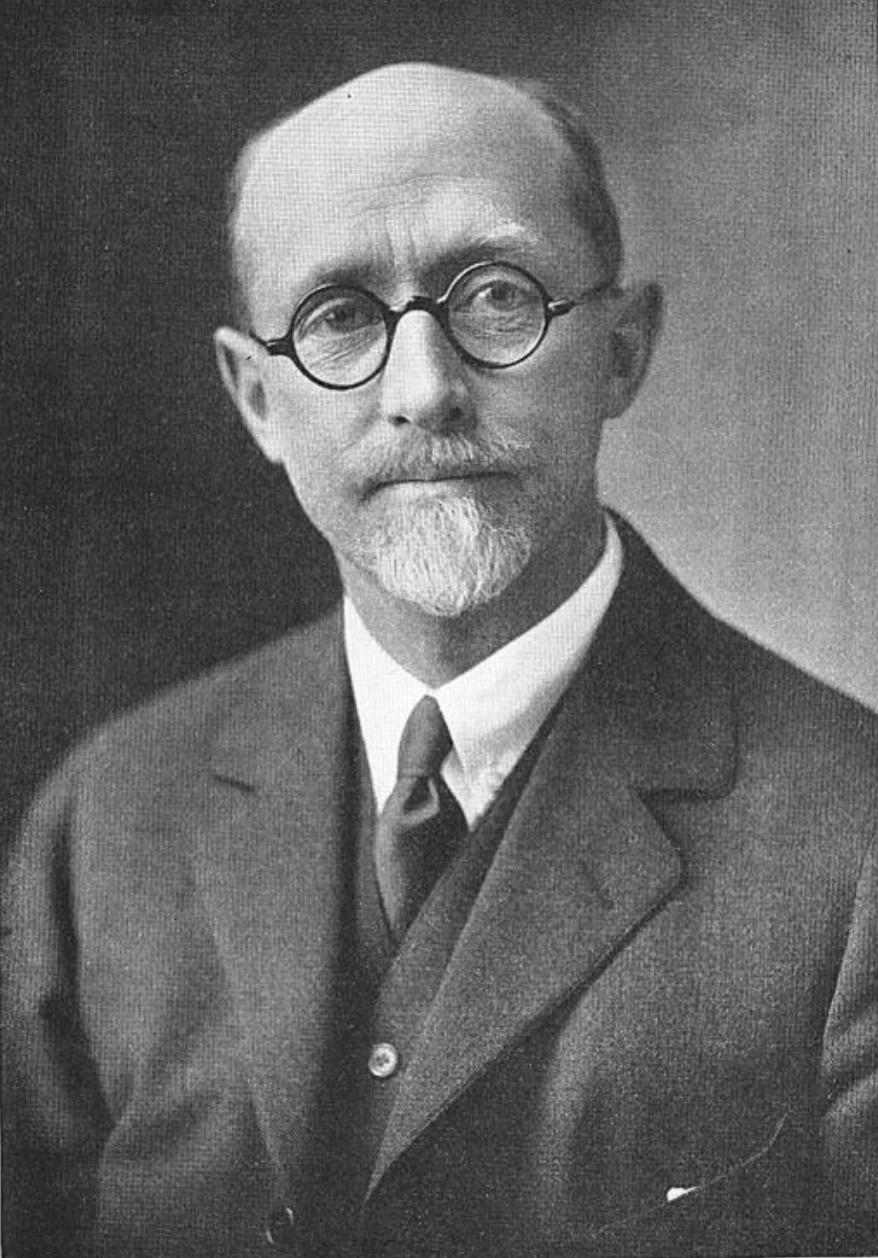
- Born: November 9, 1876; Brooklyn, New York, US
- Died: June 9, 1934 (aged 57); Weston, Massachusetts, US
- Education: Yale Forest School (MF, 1903); Harvard College (AB, 1898)
- Occupations: Forester, educator
- Employer: Harvard University (1903–34)
- Known for: Director of the Harvard Forest
- Mother: Ellen Thayer Fisher

Richard Thornton Fisher (November 9, 1876 – June 9, 1934) was an American forester, silviculturist, and educator who taught on the faculty of Harvard University and served as the founding director of the Harvard Forest from 1907 until his death in 1934. The Fisher Museum at the Harvard Forest was named in his honor.

== Early life and education ==
Fisher was born on November 9, 1876, in Brooklyn, New York. He was one of three children and the only son of Edward Thornton Fisher, a schoolteacher and headmaster, and Ellen Thayer Fisher, a botanical illustrator. Richard's uncle was the artist Abbott Handerson Thayer. Growing up, Richard often spent summer vacations with his uncle in Dublin, New Hampshire, where his experiences drew him toward natural history as a career. He completed his college preparatory education at the Harvard School in Chicago and went on to receive his AB from Harvard University in 1898.

Expected to become an English teacher, he instead spent the summer of 1898 with a United States Geological Survey team collecting specimens on Mount Shasta, where he worked with Clinton Hart Merriam and met Gifford Pinchot, who recruited him to work at the United States Division of Forestry. Fisher spent the next five years working as a field assistant except for leaves of absence to study for his Master of Forestry degree at Yale Forest School, completing his studies in 1902 and graduating in 1903. Also in 1903, he studied abroad in Germany, learning the forestry practices there. He contributed to two US Bureau of Forestry bulletins published in 1903, The Woodlot: A Handbook for Owners of Woodlands in Southern New England (coauthored with Henry S. Graves) and The Redwood (with Hermann von Schrenk and Andrew Delmar Hopkins).

== Career at Harvard ==
In 1903, Harvard recruited Fisher to organize and chair its Division of Forestry. He held the titles of Instructor in Forestry (1903–1905), Assistant Professor of Forestry (1905–1920), and assistant professor of Forestry and Lumbering (1921–1924). He was affiliated with the Bussey Institution (1913–1931), the Graduate School of Arts and Sciences (1931–1934), and the Graduate School of Business Administration (1914–1924). He took charge of the Harvard Forest in 1907 and became director of the Forest in 1915. He directed and cultivated America's leading model forest, which serves as a research center and field laboratory for students and researchers. During his three decades at Harvard, he supervised 125 graduate students, including 90 who earned master's degrees.

Fisher was active in professional associations and publishing. He authored Harvard Forest's first bulletin, The Management of the Harvard Forest, 1909–1919, along with scholarly articles in Ecology and Journal of Forestry. He received an honorary Master of Science degree from Yale in 1929 and was elected as a fellow of the Society of American Foresters in 1925. He was a member of the Ecological Society of America and the American Association for the Advancement of Science and a fellow of the American Academy of Arts and Sciences. Active in the Massachusetts Forest and Park Association, he supported the enactment of the Massachusetts Forest Taxation Law of 1922, which promoted sustainable timber management. From 1907, he was a partner in a Boston-based forestry consulting firm, which at various times included Edward S. Bryant, Austin Cary, and Frederick E. Olmsted as members.

== Personal life ==
In July 1913, he married Georgina Paine of Weston, Massachusetts. The couple had five children. Fisher died suddenly of a heart attack at the age of 57 on June 9, 1934, while golfing near his home in Weston. His friends and colleagues dedicated a bronze memorial tablet at the Harvard Forest on June 9, 1935. The Fisher Museum at the Harvard Forest was named in his honor.
