= Independent School League (Illinois) =

Athletic league of Chicago-area preparatory schools

- Conference: IHSA
- No. of teams: 8
- Region: Chicago metro area, Illinois

The Independent School League (ISL) is an athletic conference comprising 8 private secondary schools in the Chicago metro area. All but one of the schools are also full members of the Illinois High School Association, the governing body for most high school athletics and competitive activities in the state. The schools are all relatively small, most belonging to the smaller classes of competition offered by the IHSA.

== Members ==
School	Location	Founded	Enrollment	Team name	Colors	IHSA Classes 2/3/4	Reference
Francis W. Parker School	Chicago	1901	944	Colonels		A/1A/2A	
Lake Forest Academy	Lake Forest	1857	435	Caxys		(Note: As an associate member of IHSA, Lake Forest Academy is not eligible for statewide competitions.)	
Latin School of Chicago	Chicago	1888	1,175	Romans		AA/1A/2A/3A	
North Shore Country Day School	Winnetka	1880	535	Raiders		A/1A/2A	
Regina Dominican High School	Wilmette	1958	508	Panthers		A/1A/2A	
University of Chicago Laboratory Schools	Chicago	1896	2,015	Maroons		AA/2A/3A	
The Willows Academy	Des Plaines	1974	250	Eagles		A/1A/2A	
Woodlands Academy of the Sacred Heart	Lake Forest	1858	145	Wildcats		A/1A/2A	

== Other conference affiliations ==
- North Shore Country Day was the last school to support a football program. It played in the Great 8 Conference (Wisconsin) for the 2015 and 2016 seasons and discontinued the football program in 2017.
- Francis W. Parker School, Latin School, and Woodlands Academy are the only schools to sponsor a Scholastic Bowl team.

== History ==
The ISL was founded in 1967. The league initially comprised eight teams: Chicago Lab, Elgin, Latin, Morgan Park, North Shore, Francis W. Parker, Harvard–St. George School, and Glenwood.

Glenwood closed its high school in 1979, and Harvard–St. George School closed in 1993. Lake Forest Academy left the ISL in 2008 and rejoined in 2021. Regina Dominican High School joined in 2022. Morgan Park Academy left the ISL in 2023. Elgin Academy closed in 2024. Northridge Prep left the ISL in 2025.

== Membership timeline ==
Full members

== IHSA State titles ==
- Chess: Chicago Lab (1973–74)
- Scholastic Bowl: Latin School (1993–94, 97–98, 2001–02, 03–04, 04–05, 05–06, 08–09)
- Track & Field (boys): Chicago Lab (1908–09, 09–10, 10–11, 13–14, 18–19)
- Golf (boys): North Shore Country Day (2011 and 2012)
- Tennis (boys): Latin School (2020–21, 21–22)
- Tennis (girls): Jerricka Boone, Morgan Park Academy, singles champion (2009, 2011), North Shore Country Day (2017, 2018) Noelle Lanton and Addison Lanton, Elgin Academy, doubles champion with a perfect season record (2022)
- Soccer (boys): Latin School (2016–17), Chicago Lab (2019–20), North Shore Country Day (2023–24)
- Soccer (girls): Latin School (2005–06)
