= Harvard–St. George School =

Former private co-educational school in Chicago, Illinois

Coordinates: 41.8086°N 87.6014°W

Harvard–St. George School was a private, non-denominational, co-educational day school in Chicago, Illinois. The school was formed in 1962 as a result of the merger of St. George School and the Harvard Preparatory School for Boys. St. George School was a selective, racially-integrated school with low tuition. The older Harvard School for Boys had attracted students from prominent Chicago families and had itself absorbed the Princeton-Yale School in 1902. The school was known for its liberal arts education, small class sizes, and integration. The school closed in 2003.

== History of the Harvard School for Boys ==
The Harvard School for Boys was founded in 1865 by Harvard University graduate Edward S. Waters. The school was designed to prepare young men for elite universities. The school gained prominence in the late 19th and early 20th centuries. In 1902, it merged with the Princeton-Yale School to form the Harvard Preparatory School for Boy.

The school was originally housed in a building on Wabash Avenue near Congress Street in Chicago. The building was destroyed in the Great Chicago Fire of 1871, prompting several relocations. In 1917, the school moved to 4731 South Ellis Avenue in the Kenwood neighborhood of Chicago.

== History of the St George School ==
St. George School of Girls was established in 1918 by teacher, Madeline Sawyer on Montrose Avenue in Chicago. Most of its early students were homeless or came from broken homes. After a few years, St. George School began accepting boys. Sawyer's father, George J. Williams, provided a $100,000 endowment fund. In the mid 1920s, the school moved to 4545 Drexel Blvd.

However, when the faculty and parents elected to integrate in 1950, the trustees elected to close claiming the school was out of funds. This resulted in a 3-year court battle. The parents took the trustees to court. The trustees obtained a court order to lock them out of 4545 Drexel Blvd. However, the school's business manager, Anne Tyskling, who had joined the school in 1934, maintained that the school was financially viable, and was granted a 90 day stay. In 1951, the school was temporarily housed at the Rodfei Zedek synagogue. Tyskling bought the Reid mansion and reopened the school in 1952 with four of the previous teachers.

In 1950, the school had 160 students, including 92 boarders. In 1955, the numbers were 100 students including 50 boarders.

The battle to keep the school open became the subject of a case study in the 1986 text book, "Managing uncertainty: administrative theory and practice in education".

== Creation of the Harvard–St. George School ==
In the 1962, Harvard Preparatory School was purchased by St. George School. Harvard Preparatory School was in need of upkeep and St George School had been looking to expand. The schools were merged into a new coeducational and racially-integrated institution, the Harvard–St. George School.

In 1966, a new library was dedicated to the pioneering black attorney, Earl B. Dickerson.

By 1970, the school had 300 students and was hoping to expand to 400. The same year, the school joined the Anne Tyskling Consortium for the Midwest, a consortium of independent schools dedicated to diversity and new ideas. The consortium was named for the school's director, Anne Tyskling.

In 1972, the school had a student population of 300 students and a diverse student population with 52% white students and 42% black students.

The school was notable for experimenting with new teaching methods, for having no report cards, and for its winter outdoor education. Each year for a week, one third of the school decamped to Michigan, where they studied in the mornings and hit the slopes in the afternoons in an outdoor education program dubbed "Winter Walden". The school's high school students also volunteered in the community.

The school closed in 2003.

== Location ==
The combined school continued on the campus of former Harvard Preparatory School for Boys at 4731 South Ellis Avenue. The campus of St George School was sold and the $150,000 was used to refurbish the school for the combined student population.

In the late 60s, the school found itself unable to expand the Ellis Avenue site when preference was given to plans by the University of Chicago and again in 1970 when a new retirement home was green-lighted.

The school remained at the Ellis Avenue campus until the school's closure in 2003.

== Athletics ==
In the 1960s, Harvard–St. George School became a member of the Independent School League (Illinois), a competitive athletic conference of Chicago-area preparatory schools. The team was ISL tournament champs for the 1970–71 school year under coach Clarence Harvill.

In 1974, a battle ensued when student Beth Walsh tried out for the school's baseball team. She was supported by her father, who was prepared to bring a lawsuit, and by Tyskling who thought she should be able to play on an equal footing. The all-boys ISL was to meet to determine her fate.

== Notable alumni ==
- Mandy Patinkin – actor
- Jon Erikson – swimmer
