= Harvard School for Boys (Chicago) =

Former private school in Chicago, Illinois

Coordinates: 41.8086°N 87.6014°W

Harvard School for Boys was a private, non-denominational, day school in Chicago, Illinois. The school was founded in 1865 by Harvard University graduate Edward S. Waters. It was designed to prepare young men for elite universities. The school gained prominence in the late 19th and early 20th centuries. In 1902, it merged with the Princeton-Yale School to form the Harvard Preparatory School. In 1962, it was purchased by and merged with nearby St. George School, to form the Harvard–St. George School. The school was known for its rigorous liberal arts curriculum, small class sizes, and strong faculty. It attracted students from prominent Chicago families.

== History ==
The Harvard School for Boys was founded in 1865 by Harvard University graduate Edward S. Waters in a building on Wabash Avenue near Congress Street in Chicago. The school was designed to prepare young men for elite universities.

The school was affiliated with the University of Chicago. In 1902, it merged with another prep school, the Princeton-Yale School. The move was speculated to be in response to the merger of two other schools to form the popular University of Chicago Prep School; however, this was denied by the principal. The combined school was to be renamed the Harvard Preparatory School.

The school was tragically linked in 1924 to the infamous murder of Bobby Franks, a 14-year-old student kidnapped and killed by former alumni, Nathan Leopold and Richard Loeb. The case shocked the nation and the boys at the school were questioned. At the time, the school consisted of a primary school (years 1–8) and a secondary school (years 9–12) with 200–300 students. Graduating students often attended the University of Chicago or Ivy League schools on the East Coast.

In 1962, Harvard School merged with nearby St. George School to form a coeducational and racially integrated institution, the Harvard–St. George School. Changing demographics and declining enrolment led to the schools' merger.

== Location ==
The school was originally housed in a building on Wabash Avenue near Congress Street in Chicago. The building was destroyed in the Great Chicago Fire of 1871, prompting several relocations. From about 1877 to 1897, the school was located at Indiana Avenue and 21st Street. In 1897, the school relocated to 47th Street and Lake Park on the south side of Chicago in, what was then, the former Gossage Estate. The school was still at the location at Lake Avenue and 47th Street when it merged with the Princeton-Yale School in 1902.

In 1917, the school moved to 4731 South Ellis Avenue in the Kenwood neighborhood of Chicago where it remained until the merger. The combined school continued on the campus of former Harvard Preparatory School.

== Athletics ==
The school's teams were called "Hurricanes" and the team's colors were black & gold.

Notably, the school introduced interscholastic golf to Illinois in 1899. The school won the Preparatory League (golf) championship in 1901 and 1902. However, in the early 20th century, the school was considered too small to compete well in most sports.

== Notable alumni ==
- John Agar – television and film actor
- Frederic Clay Bartlett – artist
- Edward Bliss – missionary
- Philip D. Block Jr – chairman and chief executive officer of the Inland Steel Company
- Edgar Rice Burroughs – author of Tarzan
- Walter Dray – Olympic pole vaulter
- Richard Thornton Fisher – founding director of the Harvard Forest
- Frank Hoyt – physicist
- Benjamin H. Marshall – architect
- Mason Phelps – Olympic golfer
- Jerry H. Weber – tennis player
- Warren K. Wood – Olympic golfer
