= Uniting Voices Chicago =

- Formation: 1956
- Type: Youth organization
- Legal status: Non-profit organization
- Headquarters: Hyde Park, Chicago, Illinois, U.S.
- Website: ccchoir.org
- Formerly called: Chicago Children's Choir (1956–2022)

Uniting Voices Chicago, previously known as the Chicago Children's Choir from 1956 to 2022, is a nonprofit children's choir organization based in Chicago, Illinois, United States. It was founded in 1956 at the First Unitarian Church of Chicago in the city's Hyde Park neighborhood. It was renamed in October 2022.

== History ==
In 1956 during the Civil Rights Movement, the late Rev. Christopher Moore founded the multiracial, multicultural Chicago Children's Choir at Hyde Park's First Unitarian Church of Chicago. He believed that youth from diverse backgrounds could better understand each other - and themselves - by learning to make beautiful music together. Today, the choir is fully independent and serves all of Chicago from its home in the Chicago Cultural Center.

Distinguished singers included David Edmonds, who performed with the choir from 1970 to 1977. He sang classical, folk and spiritual pieces as lead soloist in numerous concerts, both in Chicago and on national tours. He can be heard on the choir's 1972 album Chicago Children's Choir Sings at Orchestra Hall. Edmonds also performed with the Joffrey Ballet, the Rockefeller Chapel Orchestra and Chorus, and the Bretton Woods Boy Singers. He died from AIDS complications in 1990.

On October 1, 2022, Chicago Children's Choir was renamed Uniting Voices Chicago.

== Discography ==
=== Albums ===
- Studs Terkel interview with Christopher Moore and CCC music (1959)
- This is Rhythm (1960) (with Ella Jenkins)
- Flower Communion (1961)
- Recording at First Unitarian Church (1962-1963)
- "You'll Sing a Song and I'll Sing a Song" recording with Ella Jenkins (1966)
- "Play Your Instruments and Make a Pretty Sound" recording with Ella Jenkins (1967)
- Chicago Children's Choir Sings at Orchestra Hall (1972)
- Behold This Star (1973)
- Jambo and Other Call and Response Songs and Chants (with Ella Jenkins) (1974)
- Chicago Children's Choir In Concert (1974)
- Let George Do It (1974)
- Chicago Children's Choir Sings for Children (1976)
- It's Music (1977)
- Lift Every Voice (1981)
- Hopping around from place to place with Ella Jenkins (1983)
- April Tour Team (1985)
- June Galas Concert (1985)
- Gospel Mass (1986)
- In the Folk Tradition (1987)
- Selections from the CCC (1990)
- Songs of the Season (1991)
- June Galas (1992)
- Japan Tour Excerpts (1992)
- Children's Choral Festival (1993)
- The Thrilling Sound of the CCC (1993)
- Hop, Hop, Hop! Sing-and-Dance Songs from Ladybug (1994) (with Oriana Singers)
- Simple Gifts (1994)
- Do You Hear the People Sing (1996) (Recorded live from South Africa tour)
- 40 Years of Harmony (1997)
- Songs of the Human Spirit (c.2000)
- Spring Gala Concert (2001)
- Chicago Children's Choir Live from Vienna (2001)
- Open Up Your Heart (2004)
- You Shall Have a Song (2004)
- Sita Ram (2008)
- Songs on the Road to Freedom (2008)
- The Very Best Time of the Year: Music for the Holiday Season (c.2009)
- Holiday Harmony (2009)
- Holiday (2010)
- We All Live Here (2016)
- Harmony Anew (2019)
- "Long Way Home" (2021)

Singles

- "Multiverse" (2024)
- "Eyes on de Prize" (2024)
- "Go Tell It" (2023)
- "United" (2022)
- "Still Here" (2022)

=== Other appearances ===
- The Life and Times - Tragic Boogie (2009, Arena Rock)
- Chance the Rapper - "All We Got", "Same Drugs", "How Great", and "Finish Line / Drown" from Coloring Book (2016)

Notable Live Appearances

- Saturday Night Live - with Karol G ("Mientras Me Curo Del Cora")
- NASCAR Chicago Street Race 2024 - "America the Beautiful"
