= William Wallace Fenn =

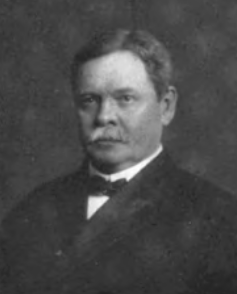
- Born: February 12, 1862; Boston, Massachusetts
- Died: March 6, 1932 (aged 70); Cambridge, Massachusetts
- Education: Harvard Divinity School
- Occupation(s): Clergyman, educator
- Spouse: Faith Huntington Fisher (m. 1891)
- Children: 5

William Wallace Fenn (February 12, 1862 – March 6, 1932) was a Unitarian minister and a dean of Harvard Divinity School. He served the First Unitarian Church of Chicago from 1890–1901.

He gave the 1921 The Ingersoll Lectures on Human Immortality.

== Biography ==
William Wallace Fenn was born in Boston on February 12, 1862. He graduated from Harvard in 1884 and received an AM and STB (bachelor of sacred theology) from the Divinity School in 1887.

He married Faith Huntington Fisher in 1891, daughter of Ellen Thayer Fisher, and they had five children.

He died at his home in Cambridge on March 6, 1932.
