= Petersham Common Historic District =

Historic district in Massachusetts, United States

- U.S. National Register of Historic Places
- U.S. Historic district
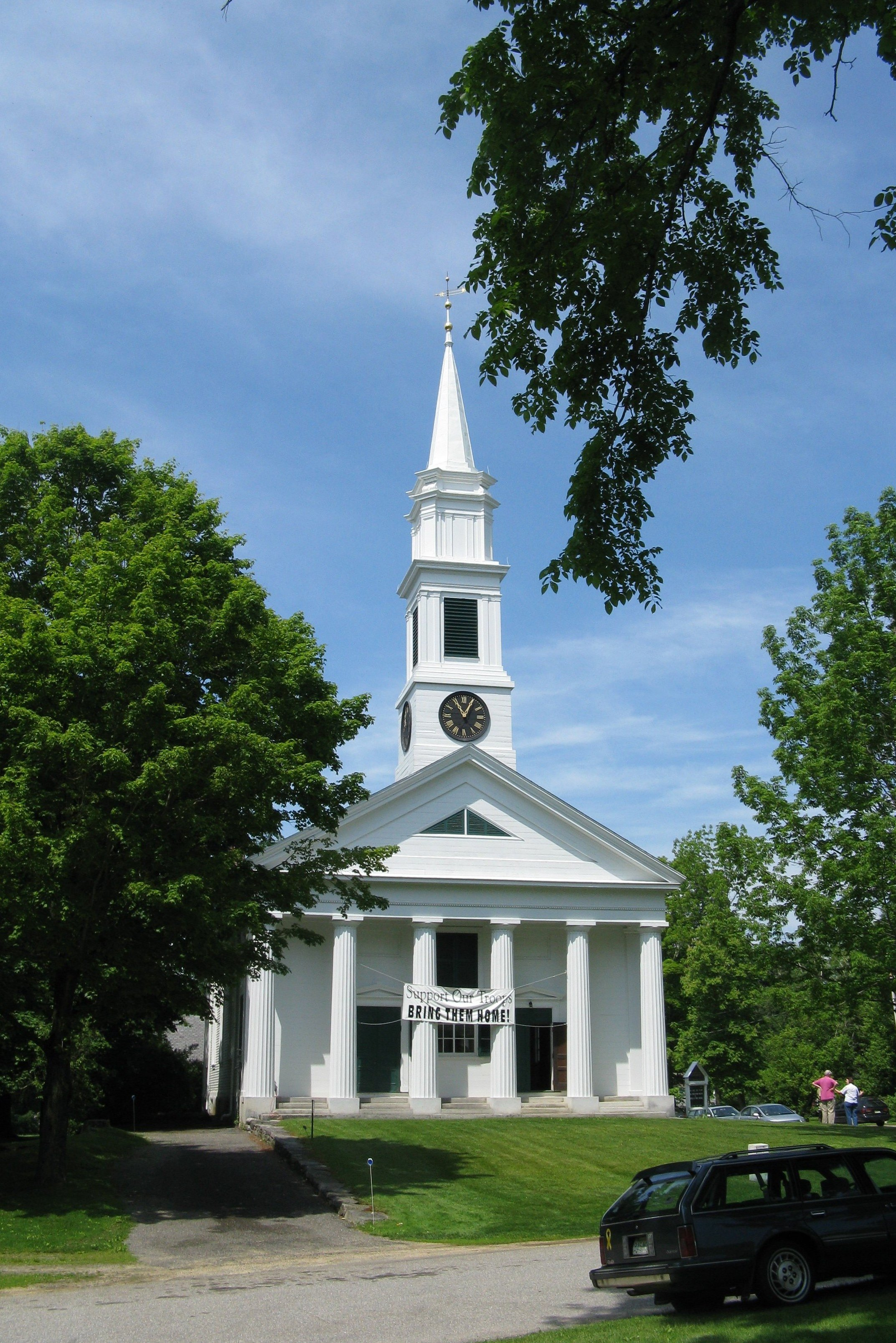
- First Congregational Parish, Unitarian

- Location within Massachusetts Location within the United States
- Location: Main and Common Sts., Petersham, Massachusetts
- Coordinates: 42°29′25″N 72°11′8″W
- Area: 47 acres (19 ha)
- Architect: Multiple
- Architectural style: Greek Revival, Late Victorian, Federal
- NRHP reference No.: 82004481
- Added to NRHP: May 11, 1982

The Petersham Common Historic District encompasses the historic town center of Petersham, Massachusetts. Laid out in 1733 and centered on the town common bounded by Main and Common Streets, it retains most of its 19th-century character, with only a few turn-of-the-20th-century civic buildings adding later character. The district was added to the National Register of Historic Places in 1982.

Buildings within the district include the Petersham Memorial Library. The Nichewaug Inn formerly occupied the district until its demolition in 2022.

== Description and history ==
Land in what is now Petersham was first granted to colonists in 1733, and the town was incorporated in 1754. Its town common was laid out in 1733, along with a series of house lots extending to the north and south, along what is now Main Street (Massachusetts Route 32). It is where the town's first meeting house was built, and it is where all of its town halls have been located. Since 1878, the common has been cared for by a village improvement society, and it has been the subject of a local historic district since 1967.

The historic district is basically linear, extending along Main Street between New Salem Road in the south and North Street in the north. Most of its 45 buildings were built before 1850; only a few are from the 20th century, and two of those (the town hall and the Unitarian Church, are from the outside reproductions of 19th-century buildings. Most of the buildings are wood-frame structures one or two stories in height; there is one brick building, built in 1848 as a schoolhouse. Two late additions to the district were designed by architect Edmund Wilson of Stone, Carpenter & Willson: the stone Petersham Memorial Library was built in 1889-91 as a memorial to the town's Civil War soldiers, and the Shingle style Hotel Nichewaug was built in 1899 as accommodations for summer visitors. Most of the other buildings in the district are Greek Revival. In addition to the common, other open space in the district includes the North Common Meadow, now a conservation property of The Trustees of Reservations.

== Nichewaug Inn ==
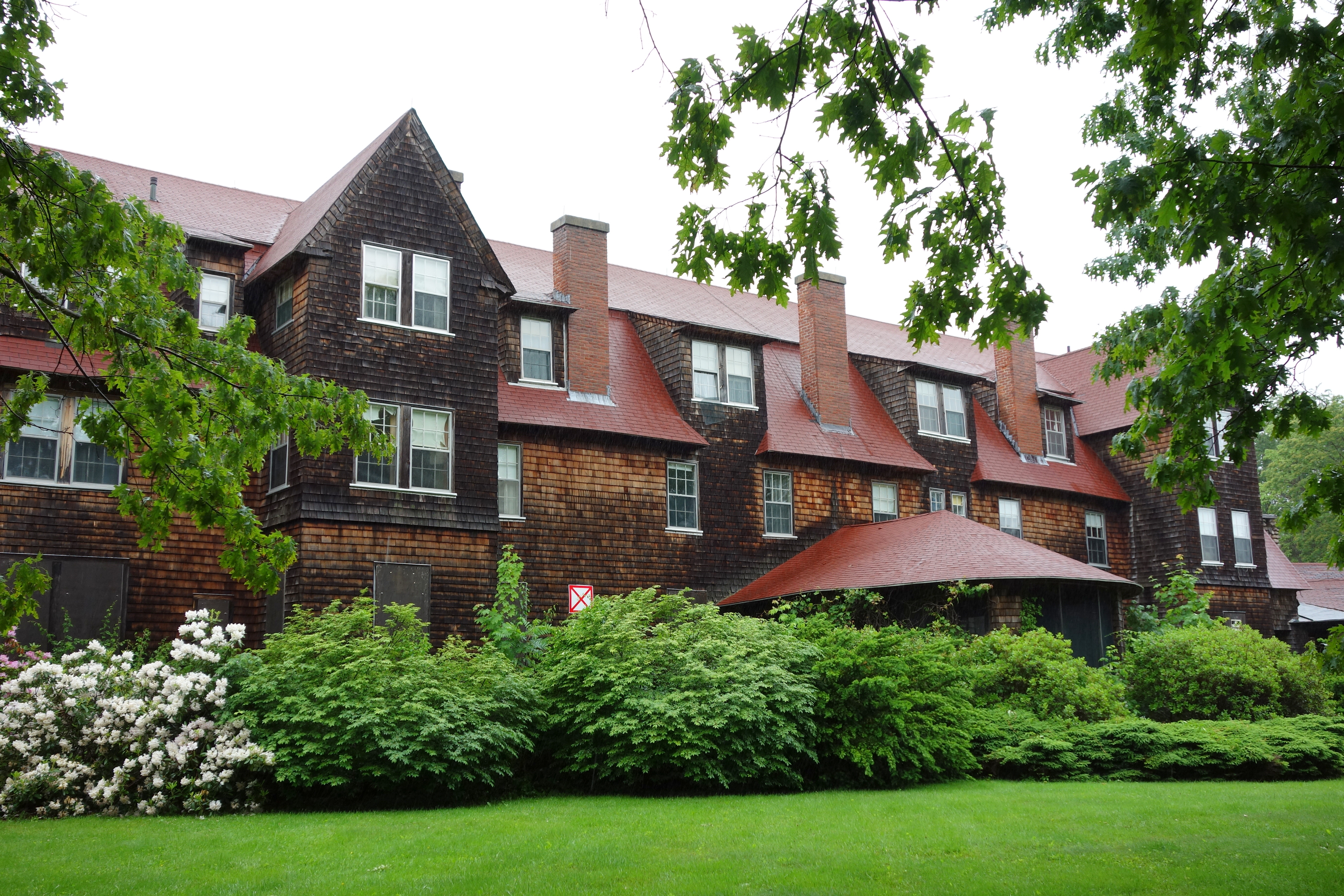
Nichewaug Inn in Petersham, Massachusetts, now demolished.

Nichewaug Inn was a historic hotel in Petersham, Massachusetts. An inn was on the site as far back as 1850. The structure was built by James Brooks in 1899 after two earlier inns on the site were destroyed by fire. It was designed by Stone, Carpenter & Willson, who also designed the Petersham Memorial Library and Petersham Center School (1906). The Inn's golf course is now North Common Meadow. Cellist Helen Isabel Moorhouse wrote letters to her lover Alice E. Brown during her stay at the inn in the summer of 1915 and they are now part of the University of Michigan collection.

In 1952 it was purchased by the Sisters of the Assumption of the Blessed Virgin who expanded it and used it as a parochial high school for two decades, Maria Assumpta Academy.

The inn has been mostly empty since the 1980s and has had several owners until being acquired by the town. In 2018, the future of the property was the subject of public hearings. In 2018 the town, which owns the building, was seeking proposals from interested buyers. No buyers were found; as a result, voters at the Petersham town meeting in June 2022 elected to demolish the structure, which commenced in August 2022.

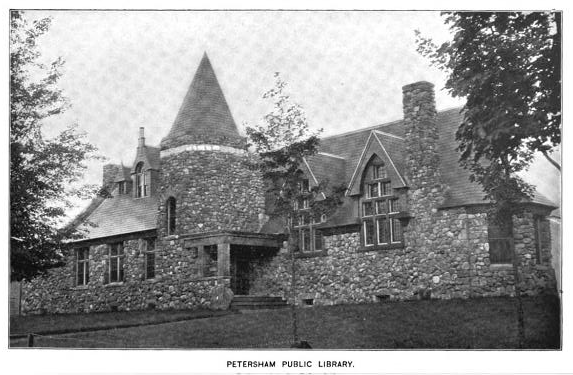
Petersham Public Library, 1899

== See also ==
- National Register of Historic Places listings in Worcester County, Massachusetts
