= Petersham, Massachusetts =

- Town
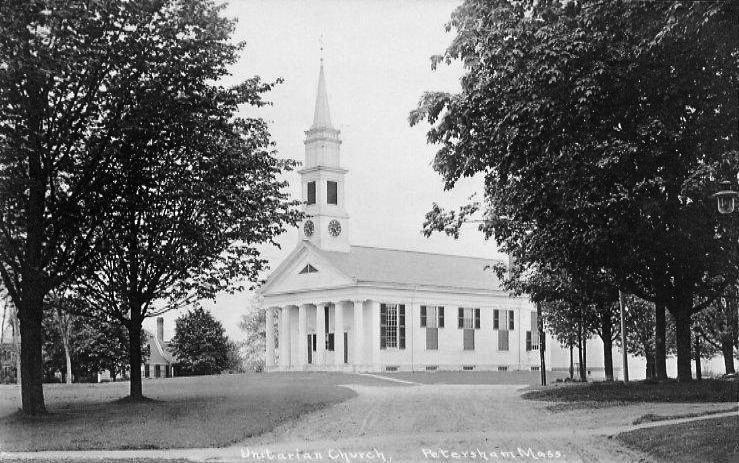
- Petersham Common

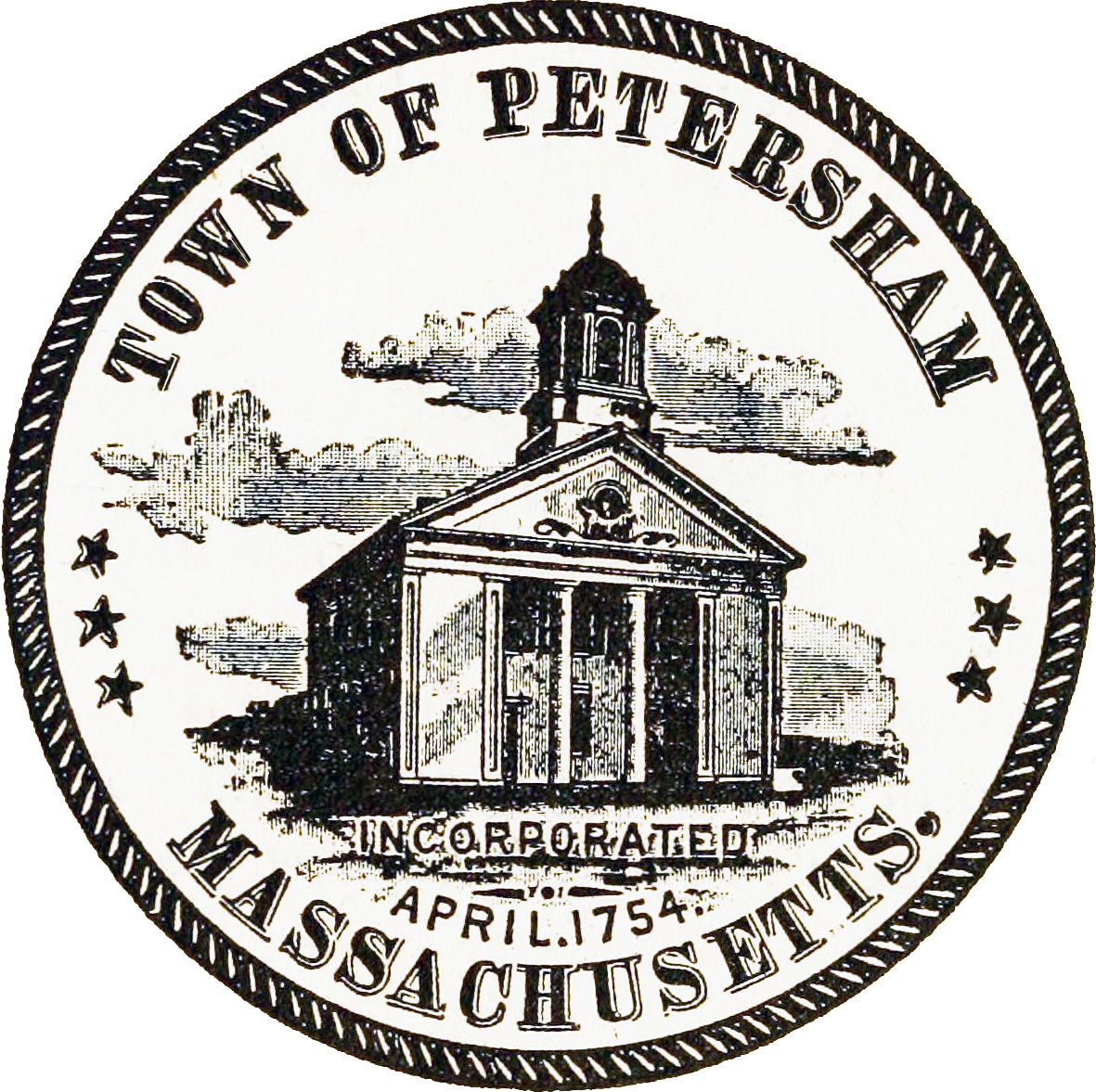
- Seal

- Location in Worcester County and the state of Massachusetts.
- Coordinates: 42°29′15″N 72°11′15″W
- Country: United States
- State: Massachusetts
- County: Worcester
- Settled: 1733
- Incorporated: 1754

Government
  - Type: Open town meeting

Area
  - Total: 68.3 sq mi (176.9 km^{2})
  - Land: 54.2 sq mi (140.5 km^{2})
  - Water: 14.1 sq mi (36.4 km^{2})
- Elevation: 1,079 ft (329 m)

Population (2020)
  - Total: 1,194
  - Density: 22.01/sq mi (8.498/km^{2})
- Time zone: UTC-5 (Eastern)
  - Summer (DST): UTC-4 (Eastern)
- ZIP code: 01366
- Area code: 351 / 978
- FIPS code: 25-53120
- GNIS feature ID: 0619486
- Website: townofpetersham.org

Petersham /ˈpiːtərsæm/ is a town in Worcester County, Massachusetts, United States. The population was 1,194 at the 2020 census. Petersham is home to a considerable amount of conservation land, including the Quabbin Reservation, Harvard Forest, the Swift River Reservation, and Federated Women's Club State Forest.

== History ==
Petersham was first settled by Europeans in 1733 and was officially incorporated on April 20, 1754. On February 4, 1787, it was the site of the second battle of Shays' Rebellion. The town is noted for its common, part of the Petersham Common Historic District. About 45 buildings are listed on the National Register of Historic Places. The Country Store, an 1842 Greek Revival structure that has housed a general store on its main floor since its opening, sits just to the East of the common.

The town's lands were expanded greatly by the building of the Quabbin Reservoir in 1938. When the towns of the Swift River Valley were disincorporated, Petersham and neighboring New Salem benefited the most, with Petersham receiving all of the former town of Dana, much of the town of Greenwich, and a small portion of the former town of Prescott east of the Middle Branch of the Swift River. Its modern southwestern borders lie along the former East and Middle branches of the Swift River, and includes lands that were once part of Hampshire County.

A memorial was erected in the town in 1927 by the New England Society of Brooklyn, New York. The memorial commemorates General Benjamin Lincoln, who raised 3,000 troops and routed the rebellion on February 4, 1787. It ends with the line, "Obedience to the law is true liberty."

== Geography and transportation ==
According to the United States Census Bureau, the town has a total area of 68.3 square miles (177 km^{2}), of which 54.2 square miles (140 km^{2}) is land and 14.1 square miles (37 km^{2}) (20.60%) is water. By virtue of the lands it gained in the construction of the Quabbin Reservoir, Petersham is the largest town by land area in Worcester County, and the fifth-largest town of the 351 cities and towns in the Commonwealth. It is the largest town by area in Central and Western Massachusetts, with the four largest towns being in southeastern Massachusetts (Plymouth, Middleborough, Dartmouth and Barnstable).

Much of the town's land is protected as part of the Quabbin Reservation, a protected area surrounding the Quabbin Reservoir. The town's borders extend well into the eastern branch of the reservoir, and includes the lands around what were once Mount Pomeroy, Mount Zion (the largest such "island" in the reservoir), and several other former hills. The lands of the Reservation are only accessible on foot, and include the only disincorporated areas which are accessible to the public, at the former Dana Common, a 1.5 miles (2.4 km) walk from Gate 40. Most of the town still drains into the Quabbin, along brooks that once met the Swift River. The town has several other hills that are part of the larger Worcester Hills region, including Whitney Hill and Camels Hump Hill, at 1,044 feet (318 m) the highest point in town. Several other parts of the town are also protected, including the Federated Women's Club State Forest, the Petersham State Forest, Harvard state Forest, the Popple Camp Wildlife Management Area, and the Phillipston Wildlife Management Area, the latter three extending into neighboring towns. Most of the town is rural in nature, with the largest population located near the town common, in the village of Petersham.

Petersham, by virtue of its territory in the Quabbin, is the westernmost town in Worcester County, bordering Franklin County to the west and a small portion of Hampshire County to the south. Petersham is bordered by Athol to the northwest, Phillipston to the northeast, Barre and Hardwick to the southeast, Ware to the south, and New Salem to the west. From the town common, Petersham is 29 miles (47 km) northwest of Worcester, 41 miles (66 km) north-northeast of Springfield, and 66 miles (106 km) west-northwest of Boston.

There are no interstates or other limited-access highways within town, with the nearest being Route 2, the major east–west route across northern Massachusetts, which lies just north of the town. Near the center of town lies the junction of Route 32 and Route 122, with Route 32 entering from Athol and Route 122 entering from New Salem. The routes pass concurrently into the town of Barre before splitting again in the southern part of that town. The town center is also the northern terminus of Route 32A, which heads southward through Hardwick, providing a more direct route from where Route 32 turns eastward in the Hardwick village of Gilbertville to the Petersham town center. Just north of the town center, the southern terminus of Route 101 lies along Route 32, heading into Phillipston along its route towards the New Hampshire border.

There are no means of mass transit in Petersham. The nearest general aviation airports are the Orange Municipal Airport, Gardner Municipal Airport and Tanner-Hiller Airport in Barre. The nearest national air service can be reached at Bradley International Airport in Connecticut.

== Education ==
Petersham is home to one public elementary school which serves kindergarten through sixth grade, the Petersham Center School. High School students attend Ralph C. Mahar Regional High School, in Orange.

== Demographics ==
Historical population
Year	Pop.	±%
1790	1,560	—
1850	1,527	−2.1%
1860	1,465	−4.1%
1870	1,335	−8.9%
1880	1,109	−16.9%
1890	1,050	−5.3%
1900	853	−18.8%
1910	757	−11.3%
1920	642	−15.2%
1930	660	+2.8%
1940	923	+39.8%
1950	814	−11.8%
1960	890	+9.3%
1970	1,014	+13.9%
1980	1,024	+1.0%
1990	1,131	+10.4%
2000	1,180	+4.3%
2010	1,234	+4.6%
2020	1,194	−3.2%
2022*	1,183	−0.9%
* = population estimate. Source: United States census records and Population Estimates Program data.

As of the census of 2000, there were 1,180 people, 438 households, and 299 families residing in the town. The population density was 21.8 people per square mile (8.4/km^{2}). There were 474 housing units at an average density of 8.7 per square mile (3.4/km^{2}). The racial makeup of the town was 97.20% White, 0.68% African American, 0.76% Native American, 0.25% Asian, 0.08% from other races, and 1.02% from two or more races. Hispanic or Latino of any race were 1.10% of the population.

There were 438 households, out of which 29.5% had children under the age of 18 living with them, 59.6% were married couples living together, 5.5% had a female householder with no husband present, and 31.7% were non-families. 27.2% of all households were made up of individuals, and 11.4% had someone living alone who was 65 years of age or older. The average household size was 2.48 and the average family size was 3.04.

In the town, the population was spread out, with 22.4% under the age of 18, 4.3% from 18 to 24, 27.0% from 25 to 44, 28.7% from 45 to 64, and 17.5% who were 65 years of age or older. The median age was 43 years. For every 100 females, there were 101.4 males. For every 100 females age 18 and over, there were 95.7 males.

The median income for a household in the town was $47,833, and the median income for a family was $58,125. Males had a median income of $39,265 versus $26,354 for females. The per capita income for the town was $24,222. About 2.0% of families and 5.8% of the population were below the poverty line, including 4.2% of those under age 18 and 1.5% of those age 65 or over.

== Library ==
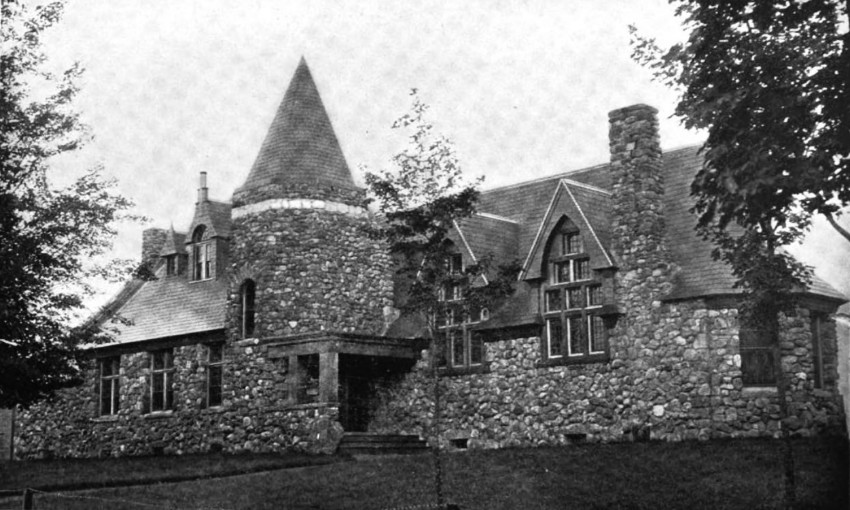
Petersham Public Library, 1899

The Petersham public library began in 1879. In fiscal year 2008, the town of Petersham spent 0.35% ($10,752) of its budget on its public library—approximately $8 per person, per year. The Nichewaug Inn and Petersham Center School were designed by the same firm, Stone, Carpenter & Willson.

== Sites of interest ==
State government
State Representative(s):	Susannah Whipps Lee (R)
State Senator(s):	Anne Gobi (D)
Governor's Councilor(s):	Paul Depalo (D)
Federal government
U.S. Representative(s):	James P. McGovern (D-2nd District),
U.S. Senators:	Elizabeth Warren (D), Ed Markey (D)

- The Country Store
- Petersham Curling Club
- Fisher Museum, Harvard Forest
- Petersham Historical Society Museum
- Most Holy Trinity Monastery

== Notable people ==
- Lewis Bigelow, congressman
- Yodelin' Slim Clark, musician
- Dorothy Eaton (1893–1968), painter
- Austin Flint, physician
- James Hawkes, congressman
- Jonas Howe (1786–1865), Massachusetts state legislator
- Emmeline B. Wells, journalist, activist
- Solomon Willard, builder of Bunker Hill Monument
