= Harvard Forest =

Ecological research area in the United States

Coordinates: 42°31′52.77″N 72°11′23.24″W

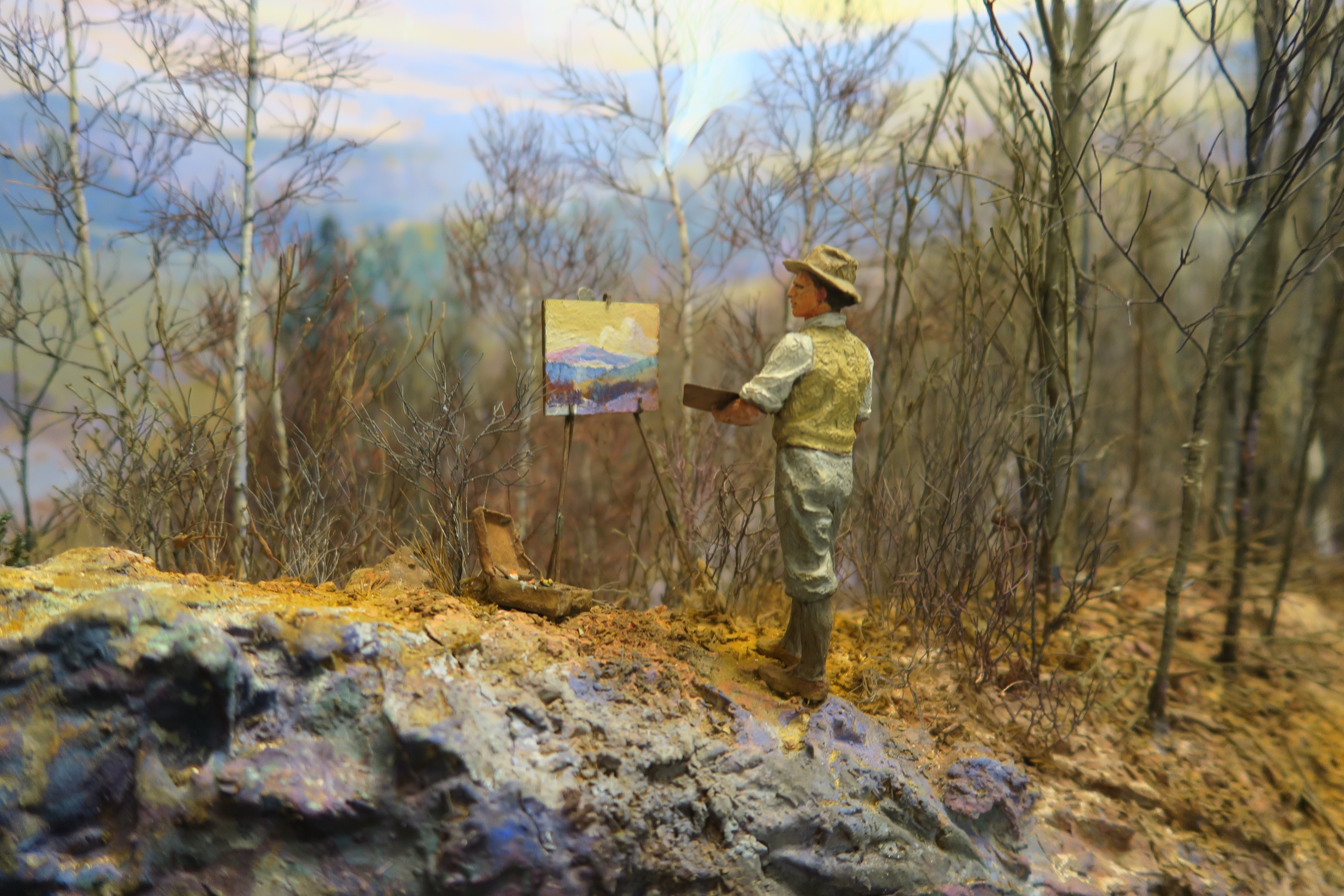
- Detail of one of the dioramas at the Fisher Museum
- Interactive map of Harvard Forest
- Established: 1907
- Operator: Harvard University
- Website: Harvard Forest

Harvard Forest is an ecological research area of 4,000 acres (16 km^{2}) owned and managed by Harvard University and located in Petersham, Massachusetts. The property, in operation since 1907, includes one of North America's oldest managed forests, educational and research facilities, a museum, and recreation trails. Harvard Forest is open to the public.

== Research and education ==
Harvard University conducts forest biology and conservation research on the property, including two major programs: the Long Term Ecological Research LTER program, funded by the National Science Foundation and established in 1988 to investigate New England's natural ecosystem; and the National Institute of Global Environmental Change program established and funded by the United States Department of Energy and emphasizing the study of physical and biological processes in relation to climate change. Harvard Forest is also slated to be the northeastern core site of the National Ecological Observatory Network. A number of smaller research programs are also conducted in Harvard Forest. This includes the Schoolyard LTER program, which allows K-12 classrooms to participate in the collection and analysis of environmental data

== Soils ==
The forest is mostly supported by stony sandy loam podzol soils developed on glacial till and most commonly mapped as Berkshire, Becket, Skerry, Peru, and Marlow series. However, the classic podzol banded appearance is absent from many profiles due to obliteration of the pale eluvial (A2 or E) horizon by earthworm activity, which was noted in Harvard Forest in the 1920s.

== The Fisher Museum ==
The Fisher Museum, open on weekends, offers exhibits on current research as well as twenty-three model dioramas portraying the history, conservation and management of New England woodlands. A sixty-seat lecture hall is located in the museum. The museum was named in honor of Richard Thornton Fisher, a Harvard faculty member and the founding director of Harvard Forest.

Harvard Forest staff and students conduct educational programs and guided natural history tours for adults and children. Self-guided interpretive trails are located on the property, as well as several miles of primitive roads and trails, open to the public for non motorized recreation including hiking, wildlife observation, mountain biking, cross country skiing, hunting (in season) and similar passive pursuits. Camping, fires, and motorized vehicles are not allowed. An observation tower is located on the forest's Prospect Hill Tract.

The Fisher Museum and primary trailhead are located on Massachusetts Route 32 north of Petersham center.

Harvard Forest is part of an area of over 4,000 acres (16 km^{2}) of protected open space including several properties owned by The Trustees of Reservations, state forest land, and the Massachusetts Audubon Society's Rutland Brook Sanctuary.
