= Bush Tetras =

American post-punk band

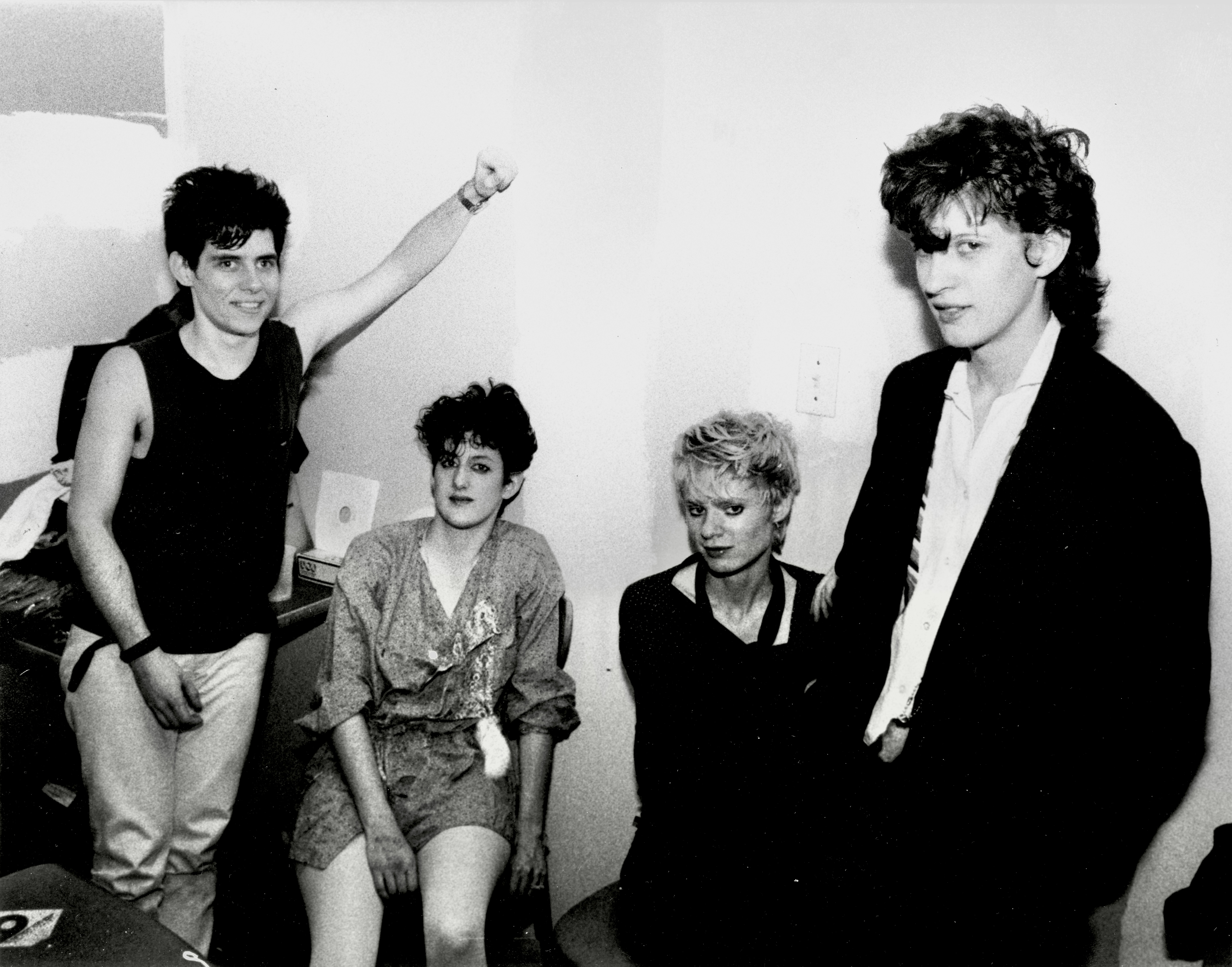
- Bush Tetras in Boston, 1980

Background information
- Origin: New York City
- Genres: Post-punk, no wave, dance-punk, avant-funk
- Years active: 1979–1983, 1995–1998, 2005–present
- Labels: 99 Records, Fetish Records, Stiff Records, ROIR, Thirsty Ear, Tim/Kerr Records, Polygram Records
- Members: Pat Place; Cynthia Sley; Steve Shelley; Rocky O'Riordan
- Past members: Jimmy Joe Uliana; Adele Bertei; Laura Kennedy; Bob Albertson; Don Christensen; Julia Murphy; Cindy Rickmond; Dee Pop (Dimitri Papadopoulos); Val Opielski; RB Korbet

Bush Tetras are an American post-punk No Wave band from New York City, formed in 1979. They are best known for the 1980 song "Too Many Creeps", which exemplified the band's sound of "jagged rhythms, slicing guitars, and sniping vocals". Although they did not achieve mainstream success, the Bush Tetras were influential and popular in the Manhattan club scene and college radio in the early 1980s. New York's post-punk revival of the 2000s was accompanied by a resurgence of interest in the genre, with the Tetras' influence heard in many of that scene's bands.

== History ==
=== Formation, name, and early years ===
The Bush Tetras formed in 1979, and soon solidified with a lineup of Cynthia Sley (vocals), Pat Place (guitar), Laura Kennedy (bass) and Dee Pop (drums); vocalist Adele Bertei and guitarist Jimmy Joe Uliana were brief early members. Place had previously been the original guitarist and a founding member of the no wave band the Contortions, though the Tetras sound was less frantic and disjointed, and she had also appeared in some of Vivienne Dick's movies.

The band was named after a tiny African primate the band found very cute called "bush babies", and a kind of fish the band liked called a "neon tetra" (taking one word from each of those names). The band thought the name sounded "tribal".

The band's debut 7-inch EP, "Too Many Creeps", was released in 1980 on 99 Records. It reached No. 57 on the Billboard club play chart. The follow-up, "Things That Go Boom in the Night", was issued in 1981 by Fetish Records, hitting No. 43 on the UK Indie Chart. The Rituals 12-inch EP, produced by Topper Headon of the Clash and including the popular "Can't Be Funky", was released in 1981 by Fetish in the UK and by Stiff Records in the U.S. It reached No. 32 on the Billboard club chart.

Two live tracks (a cover of John Lennon's "Cold Turkey" and "Punch Drunk") appeared on the 1981 Stiff Records compilation Start Swimming, documenting a one-night showcase of New York bands (also including the Bongos, the Raybeats and the dBs) at the Rainbow in London on February 20, 1981. Another live release, the cassette-only Wild Things (1983), was issued by ROIR.

Kennedy and Pop left in 1983, replaced briefly by bassist Bob Albertson and drummer Don Christensen, but the band soon broke up. ROIR issued a posthumous cassette-only collection, Better Late Than Never (Original Studio Recordings 1980-1983) in 1989.

In the 1984 Kiki Smith/Ellen Cooper film Cave Girls, Bush Tetras music plays over long passages of out of focus, foggy, visually noisy, action.

=== Reunions ===
The original line-up of Bush Tetras reformed in 1995 and released the album Beauty Lies in 1997. Two other compilations were also issued, a CD version of Better Late Than Never retitled Boom in the Night (Original Studio Recordings 1980-1983) in 1995, and Tetrafied: Previously Released Recordings in 1996.

In 1997, Kennedy departed again and was replaced as bassist by Julia Murphy. In 1998, they recorded an album with producer Don Fleming for Mercury Records, titled Happy, but it was shelved when Mercury was sold (the album was finally released in 2012 by ROIR).

In 2005, the band resumed performing in New York City, and toured Europe in summer 2006.

Original bassist Kennedy died on November 14, 2011, after a long battle with liver disease.

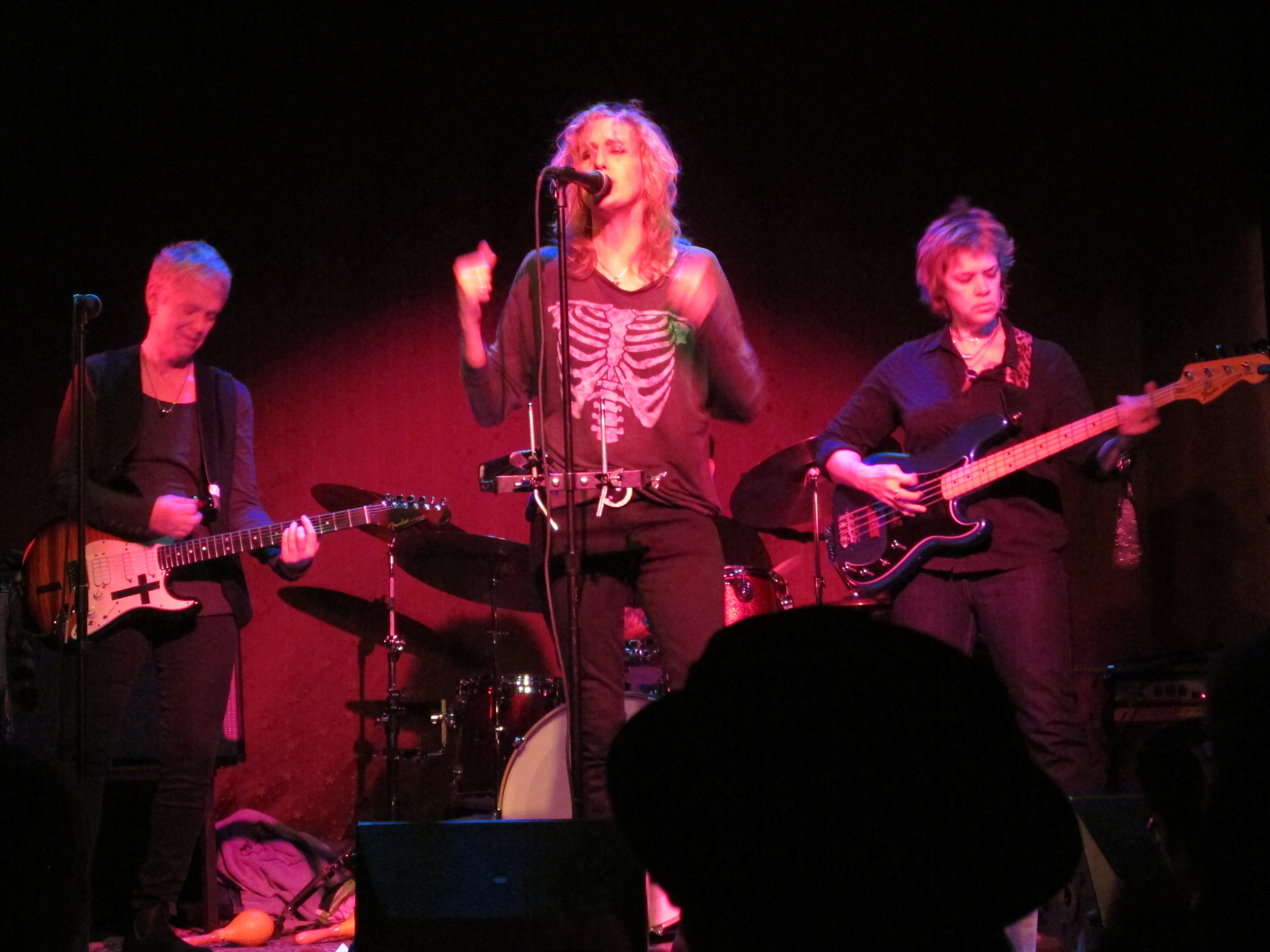
Bush Tetras in 2013.

In February 2013, Cindy Rickmond (formerly of Cheap Perfume, Grayson Hugh, Church of Betty and Unknown Gender) briefly replaced Murphy as the band's bassist.

In early 2016, Val Opielski (formerly of Krakatoa, Walking Hellos, PSXO and 1000 Yard Stare) joined the group on bass.

In 2018, they released an EP, Take the Fall, on Wharf Cat Records.Then, in 2019, they released a 7-inch single, "There Is a Hum", on Thirdman Records.

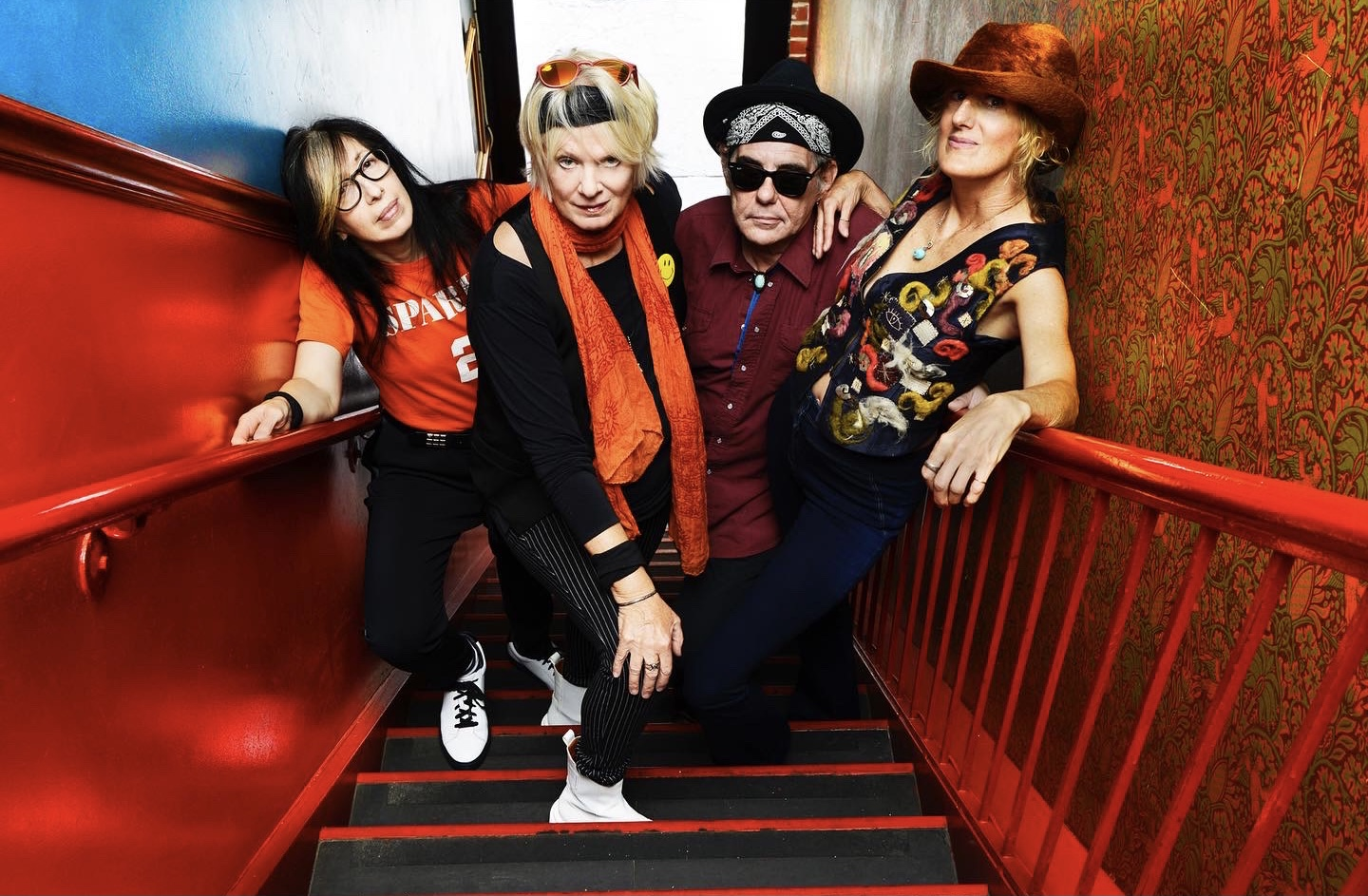
Bush Tetras in 2021

Drummer Dee Pop died on October 9, 2021. In November 2021, a career-spanning boxed set titled Rhythm and Paranoia: the Best of the Bush Tetras was released, along with a booklet with contributions by Topper Headon of The Clash and Thurston Moore of Sonic Youth. A performance at New York's Le Poisson Rouge accompanied the release, with "Too Many Creeps" producer Don Christensen replacing Dee Pop on drums, and new bassist RB Korbet playing with the band in front of a live audience for the first time.

In March 2022 the Bush Tetras performed at a Dee Pop memorial show at NYC's Bowery Electric. Steve Shelley of Sonic Youth filled in on drums.

On April 5, 2023, it was announced the Cait O'Riordan had joined the band on bass.

== Other projects ==
After the band's initial breakup, Sley joined up with Ivan Julian of Richard Hell and the Voidoids to form Lovelies. They put out one percussive post-punk album, Mad Orphan (109 Records), in 1988. In 2008, she formed Command V with Pat Irwin (of the Raybeats and the B-52s), and Rachel Dengiz. They released a self-titled album in 2012 on Mush Records.

Drummer Dee Pop also performed with improvisational jazz groups Radio I-Ching and Freedomland, and has performed or recorded with rock-oriented bands and artists including Floor Kiss, Immaculate Hearts, the Shams, Black Flies, John Sinclair, Jayne County, the Amazing Cherubs, Fur, Michael Karoli (Can), Richard Lloyd, James Chance, the Slits, Odetta, Gary Lucas, Bobby Radcliff, Patti Palladin, Darlene Love, Andy Shernoff, the Waldos, Nona Hendryx, Band of Outsiders, Lenny Kaye, Jahn Xavier and the Gun Club. He also performed with jazz musicians Eddie Gale, Roy Campbell Jr., Marc Ribot, Mark Helias, Dick Griffin, Billy Bang, Borah Bergman and Hanuman Sextet.

Pat Place also played with Maggie Estep's I Love Everybody and Joey's Oscar in the 1990s; at one time, she was a member of James Chance and the Contortions, playing steel guitar and featuring on the Brian Eno-produced No New York as one of four bands in the initial New York no wave scene.

== Discography ==
=== Studio albums ===
- Beauty Lies (1997, Polygram Records)
- Very Very Happy (2007, ROIR)
- Happy (2012, ROIR)
- They Live in My Head (2023, Wharf Cat Records)

=== Singles and EPs ===
- "Too Many Creeps" 7-inch EP (1980, 99 Records) No. 57 Billboard Dance Club Songs
- "Things That Go Boom in the Night" 7-inch single (1981, Fetish Records) No. 43 UK Indie Chart
- "Can't Be Funky" 7-inch single (1981, Fetish Records)
- Rituals 12-inch EP (1981, Fetish Records/Stiff Records) No. 32 Billboard Dance Club Songs
- "Page 18" 12-inch single (1996, Tim/Kerr Records)
- "Too Many Creeps" 7-inch single (2011, ROIR)
- "Take the Fall" EP (2018, Wharf Cat Records)
- "There is a Hum" 7” (2019, Thirdman Records)

=== Live albums ===
- Wild Things cassette-only (1983, ROIR)

=== Compilation albums ===
- Better Late Than Never (Original Studio Recordings 1980-1983) cassette-only (1989, ROIR)
- Boom in the Night (Original Studio Recordings 1980-1983) (1995, ROIR)
- Tetrafied: Previously Released Recordings (1996, Thirsty Ear)
- Rhythm and Paranoia: The Best of Bush Tetras (2021, Wharf Cat Records)

=== Compilation appearances ===
- "Cold Turkey" (John Lennon cover) and "Punch Drunk" on Start Swimming (1981, Stiff Records)
- "Das Ah Riot" on The Last Testament (1983, Fetish Records)
- "Rituals" on New York Rockers (1989, ROIR)
- "Too Many Creeps" on Totally Wired (1995, Razor & Tie)
- "Cowboys in Africa" on I [Heart] New York Punk! (1995, free with Mojo issue 144)
- "Sister Midnight" (Iggy Pop cover) on We Will Fall: The Iggy Pop Tribute (1997, Royalty Records)
- "Too Many Creeps" on New Wave Dance Hits of the '80s: Just Can't Get Enough (1997, Rhino Records)
- "Too Many Creeps" on Rough Trade Shops - Post Punk 01 (2003, Mute Records)
- "Can't Be Funky" on New York Noise (Dance Music from the New York Underground 1978-1982) (2003, Soul Jazz Records)
- "Too Many Creeps" on The Definitive Story of CBGB (The Home of U.S. Punk) (2006, Salvo)
- "Punch Drunk" on So Indie It Hurts: Roir Rocks Volume One (2008, ROIR)
- "Too Many Creeps" on Death Disco (Mojo Presents a Compendium of Post-Punk Grooves) (2014, free with Mojo issue 246)

== Members ==
Current

- Cynthia Sley – vocals (1979–1983, 1995–1998, 2005–present)
- Pat Place – guitar (1979–1983, 1995–1998, 2005–present)
- Steve Shelley – drums (2022–present)
- Cait O'Riordan – bass (2023–present)

Former

- Laura Kennedy – bass (1979–1983, 1995–1997) (died 2011)
- Jimmy Joe Uliana – guitar (1979)
- Adele Bertei – vocals (1979)
- Bob Albertson – bass (1983)
- Julia Murphy – bass (1997–2013, 2015)
- Cindy Rickmond – bass (2013)
- Val Opielski – bass (2015–2020)
- Dee Pop – drums (1979–1983, 1995–1998, 2005–2021) (died 2021)
- Don Christensen – drums (1983), (2021–2022)
- R.B. Korbet – bass (2022)
