= Off White =

Studio album by James White and the Blacks
- Released: 1979
- Recorded: September–December 1978
- Genre: No wave, art punk, punk jazz, post-disco
- Length: 42:06
- Label: ZE
- Producer: James Chance

James White and the Blacks chronology
Off White (1979)	Sax Maniac (1982)

Off White is a 1979 album by American no wave band James White and the Blacks.

== History ==
In late 1978, ZE Records co-founder Michael Zilkha approached James Chance and offered Chance $10,000 to record a disco album. Zilkha gave little direction and asked the band for its own take on the genre. Anya Phillips, Chance's manager and girlfriend, came up with the idea to rename James Chance and the Contortions to James White and the Blacks for the album. An alternate name, James White and His Blacks, was rejected by Zilkha. Phillips and the band put together outfits resembling 1960s soul singers.

Chance said that he was interested in the monotonous sound of disco music because it "doesn't have beginnings and ends". His persona is an homage to soul and funk musician James Brown. Chance was also intrigued by the shock value of a punk group embracing disco. He received disco records for free and passed time listening to a record for several seconds before throwing it out a window. Chance wrote a piece for the first issue of East Village Eye, praising disco and denouncing "outdated, cornball 'new/no wave' drivel".

Off White includes contributions from Lydia Lunch, Robert Quine, and Vivienne Dick. The band spent most of their budget recording the album's first side and used instrumentals for the second side. The album often discusses racial issues, and most of its titles are references to race. Some responded to the Off White with accusations of racism. Chance later responded, "I was the one that brought black music onto the whole punk scene, and I took a lot of shit for it…I was just playing with my whole image of a white person doing black music."

James White and the Blacks promoted the album with a February 1979 performance at Club 57 in the East Village, Manhattan. ZE rented Irving Plaza for the album's launch party, where the band lip synced its songs. The band's live performances included two teenage dancers called the Disco Lolitas.

The band released "Contort Yourself" as a 12" vinyl single. The song originally appeared on Buy, and the group re-recorded it with a disco beat. Chance observed that the tempo was too fast to be played in discos, so ZE labelmate August Darnell created a remix of it. Darnell used a slower tempo and wrote a new guitar part. James White and the Blacks' version of "Contort Yourself" was later included in ZE's 1981 Mutant Disco compilation, its 2003 NY No Wave compilation, Strut Records' 2008 Disco Not Disco 3, and ZE's 2009 compilation for its 30th anniversary.

== Critical reception ==
Professional ratings
Review scores
Source	Rating
AllMusic	4/5 stars
Christgau's Record Guide	B−
DownBeat	4.5/5 stars
MusicHound Rock: The Essential Album Guide	3.5/5 stars

Upon the album's release, Billboard said that it "commands attention" and described the music as "savage, uncompromising, sometimes dissonant, but always interesting". The Village Voice critic Robert Christgau described it as "pretty good to dance to" but added that "like so much disco music it gets tedious over a whole side." AllMusic characterized Off White as "an acquired taste" containing "some of the most challenging, intriguing music to emerge from the post-punk era." The Guardian included Off White in its list of "1000 albums to hear before you die". DownBeat critic Larry Birnbaum wrote, "At the risk of sounding like the typical tabloid scribbler, this is the best rock ‘n’ roll I've heard all year".

== Track listing ==
All tracks are written by James White unless otherwise noted.

Side One
No.	Title	Writer(s)	Length
1.	"Contort Yourself" (produced by August Darnell)		6:15
2.	"Stained Sheets"	Chance, Lydia Lunch	5:51
3.	"(Tropical) Heat Wave"	Irving Berlin	3:55
4.	"Almost Black, pt. 1"	Chance, Kristian Hoffman	3:17

Side Two
No.	Title	Writer(s)	Length
1.	"White Savages"	Chance, Hoffman	4:52
2.	"Off Black"		6:29
3.	"Almost Black, pt. 2"	Chance, Hoffman	3:59
4.	"White Devil"		4:36
5.	"Bleached Black"		2:52

== Personnel ==
James White and the Blacks

- James White – alto saxophone, organ, vocals
- Jody Harris – guitar
- Pat Place – slide guitar
- George Scott III – bass
- Don Christensen – drums

Additional personnel

- Robert Quine – guitar on 6, 7
- Vivienne Dick– viola on 8
- Paul Colin – tenor saxophone on 4, 7
- Kristian Hoffman – piano 2, 3, vocals on 3
- Adele Bertei – piano on 1, vocals on 4
- Ray Mantilla – congas on 3
- Lydia Lunch – guitar on 8, vocals (as Stella Rico) on 2
- Anya Phillips – vocals on 3, 4
