= Stacy Cochran =

American film director

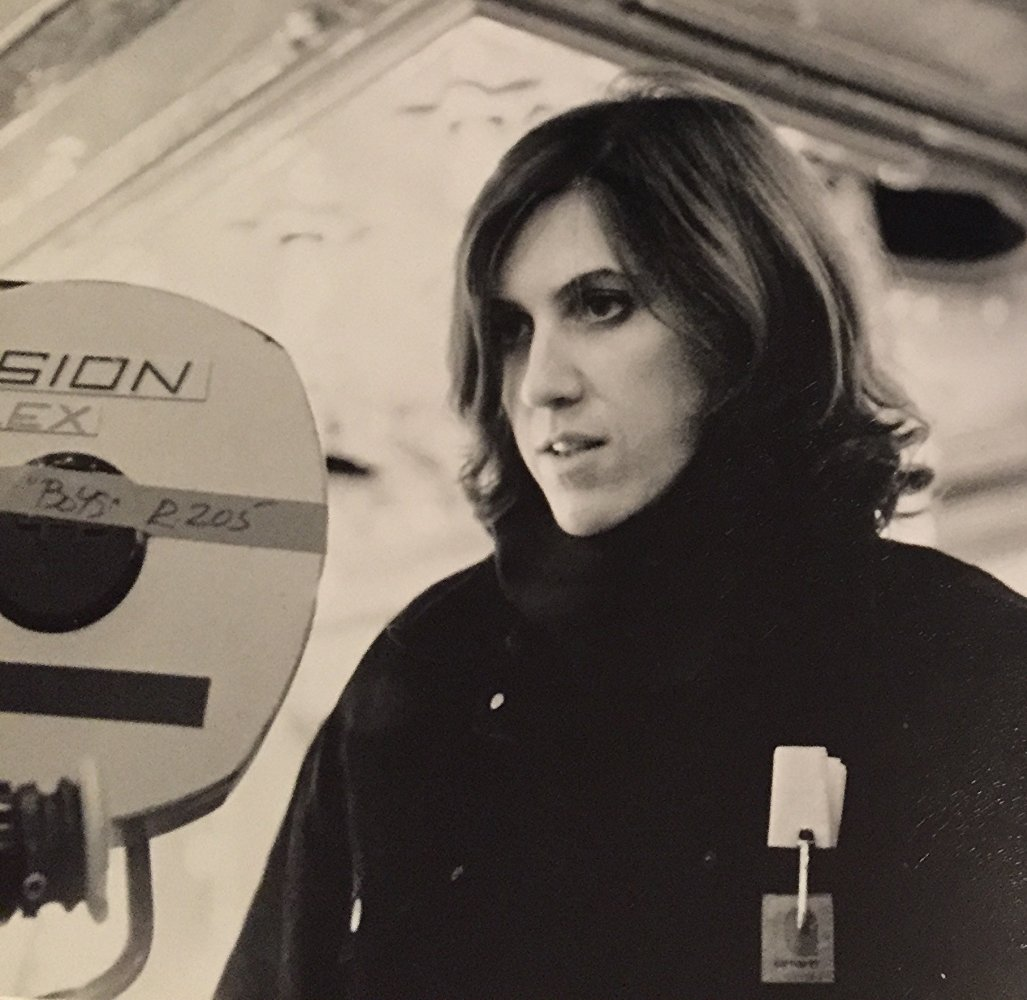
- Cochran on the set of Boys
- Born: Passaic, New Jersey, USA
- Education: Williams College; Columbia University
- Occupation: Filmmaker
- Years active: 1990–present

Stacy Cochran is an American film director, screenwriter and producer based in New York City. She is best known for her films My New Gun (1992) and Boys (1996).

== Personal life ==
Cochran was born in Passaic, New Jersey. She graduated from Williams College as a Political Science major, and earned her MFA in film from Columbia University. Cochran received the Arthur Levitt Artist-in-Residence at Williams College in 2002. She was a member of the Board of Trustees of the Massachusetts Museum of Contemporary Art (MASS MoCA) from 2006-2014 and was head of its Program Advisory committee.

== Career ==
Cochran is part of the wave of independent writer-directors whose first movies appeared in the 1990s.

=== My New Gun (1992) ===
Cochran wrote My New Gun as a thesis script for her MFA degree. She began directing the comedy within weeks of completing film school, financed by Columbia TriStar HV and produced by IRS Media. Ed Lachman came on as cinematographer and Diane Lane joined the project as the young housewife whose husband gives her a gun for protection that she neither needs nor wants. The movie received enthusiastic acclaim in its premiere at Director's Fortnight at Cannes (1992), and earned an Independent Spirit Award nomination for Best First Feature. It has been described as an examination of surburbia.

My New Gun, with a score by Pat Irwin, continued to play at festivals including the Toronto Film Festival where it was seen by The New Yorker critics Michael Sragow and Terrence Rafferty. Rafferty's review stated that “Cochran’s isn’t a satirist’s world, or a cartoonist’s, or a fairy-tale teller’s; it’s more like a novelist’s. Yet the sort of liberation that ‘My New Gun’ proposes, and embodies, is the product of a true filmmaker's vision.” Hal Hinson of The Washington Post described it as "Stacy Cochran's coolly funny, immaculately modulated first feature." Janet Maslin of The New York Times stated, “‘My New Gun’ is a delectably wry slice of suburban life, imagined by Ms. Cochran and played with perfect bewilderment by the enormously appealing Ms. Lane.” Manohla Dargis of The Village Voice wrote, “In ‘My New Gun,’ director Stacy Cochran doesn't fetishize sidearms. A restless signifier, the gun is passed back and forth between Debbie and Skippy like a hot potato. It's a symbolic exchange as telling as it is funny. In ‘My New Gun,’ the .38 in question is both a rod and a piece, male and female, a sign of just how fluid gender roles can be.”

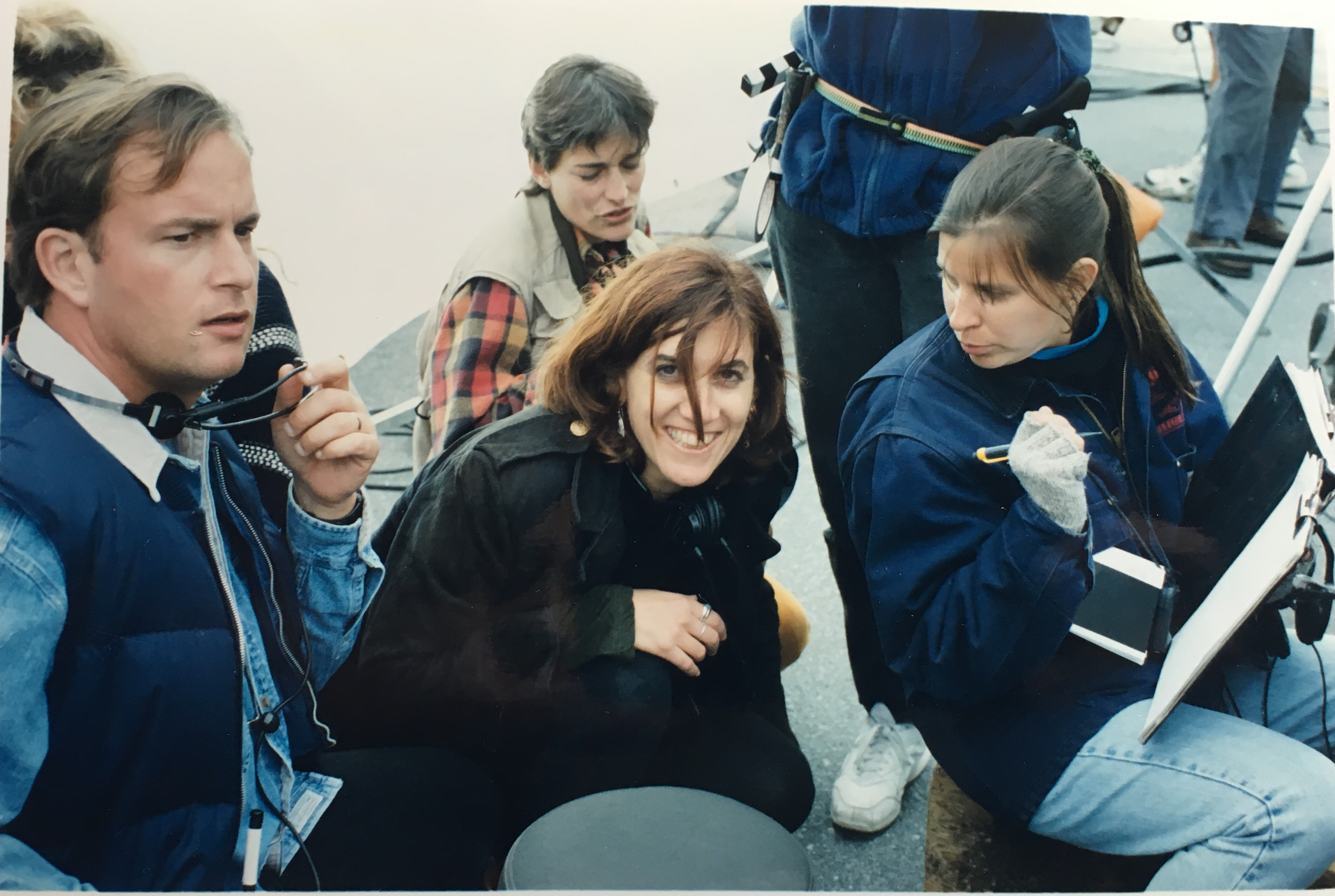
On the set of Boys, from left: Eric Heffron, Demmie Todd, Stacy Cochran, Julie Oppenheimer

=== Boys (1996) ===
Following the success of My New Gun, Cochran was approached to develop a feature film based on Twenty Minutes, a short story by James Salter about a woman who falls off her horse and lies dying in a meadow. She reconceived the eight-page story as a dark but comic riff on the tale of Snow White, and won Salter’s approval to move forward with the film.

Interscope Pictures signed on to produce the resulting Boys, and attached Winona Ryder and Lukas Haas to play the lead roles. The movie’s two leads were separated from Cochran during filming, despite her being the movie’s writer/director, and the film was subsequently subjected to an unexpectedly extensive editing process. The distributor, Touchstone Pictures, was ultimately unwilling to screen Boys for critics or press before its release.

The New Yorker critic Terrence Rafferty chose to write about the movie anyway, going to see it on its theatrical release date. He published a review, describing the film as “Essentially a screwball comedy, but one that dares to do without the familiar contrivances of farce. What holds the movie’s volatile mixture of tones and characters together is the filmmaker’s willingness to ride her own complex romantic sensibility as far as it will take her. This young filmmaker may have a more deeply subversive sensibility than any of her celebrated peers.” He went on to state, “No wonder ‘Boys’ has baffled almost everyone. Cochran keeps throwing screwballs to viewers who can't seem to handle anything but the hard stuff anymore.”

Cochran described the evolution of the project in Tod Lippy's Projections 11: New York Film-makers on New York Film-making, noting “that the thing that was mostly lost from Boys, in the end, was its sense of humor about itself.”

=== Richard Lester! (1998) ===
Cochran's next project, Richard Lester!, was a 30-minute film about director Richard Lester. She produced a one-day shoot about (and with) the director of A Hard Days Night, Help!, Petulia, and The Three Musketeers. The playful documentary was shot by Robert Elswit on Super8 film and video in an open field near Mr. Lester's Twickenham Studios office. It premiered at the Toronto Film Festival and provided the inspiration for a series of tributes to Mr. Lester, including at the American Museum of the Moving Image in New York, and at the Hamptons Film Festival, which Mr. Lester attended. Michael Sragow said in the New Yorker that, in Cochran's “salute to the director, jubilantly entitled ‘Richard Lester!’, Lester conveys a freewheeling, iconoclastic intelligence. Although he defines his ultrafast working method as ‘panic masquerading as exuberance,’ this film testifies to Lester's blithe fearlessness.”

=== Drop Back Ten (2000) ===
After Richard Lester!, Cochran wrote the screenplay that became Drop Back Ten. The film is about an unemployed writer who, after writing a book on the NFL, is hired to write a magazine profile of a young actor. Drop Back Ten hinges on the writer’s realization that there’s an ugliness beneath the exterior of the actor he comes to know, and the film deals with the ethical gray area inhabited by all of its characters. The movie premiered in Dramatic Competition at Sundance in 2000. Cochran herself was unable to attend, as her third daughter was born in New York on the same day as the premiere.

The movie was completed after its festival premiere, adding a score by Pat Irwin, a transfer to black-and-white, and “I Want It All” by Depeche Mode as the end credits track.

=== Write When You Get Work (2018) ===
Cochran's most recent feature, Write When You Get Work, is a love story, and it was completed in 2018, starring Rachel Keller, Finn Wittrock and Emily Mortimer, James Ransone, Jessica Hecht, Scott Cohen, Tess Frazer, Afton Williamson, and Andrew Schulz. She has stated her 18-year hiatus after Drop Back Ten was due to having three children. As with all her previous movies, Cochran collaborated with casting director Todd Thaler.

Robert Elswit joined the production as cinematographer and shot the movie in 20 days in New York City on Super16 film stock. The movie premiered in March 2018 at SXSW in narrative competition. Online publication Hammer to Nail wrote of the premiere: "With 'Write When You Get Work', we have a delectable mix of a romantic comedy and a heist thriller, set against the backdrop of enormous privilege, the whole served up with more than a dollop of astute social criticism. It’s beautiful storytelling, and a refreshing break from the crushing sameness of so many blockbusters of our era."

Write When You Get Work received the Tito's Handmade Vodka Award at the Asbury Park Music & Film Festival, and the New York Showcase Award at the Harlem International Film Festival. Its first draft was written several years ago, originally titled Love Story of Thieves.

== Films ==
- 1990: Another Damaging Day
- 1992: My New Gun
- 1996: Boys
- 1998: Richard Lester!
- 2000: Drop Back Ten
- 2018: Write When You Get Work
- 2020 Heartbeat of Squirrels (Short Film) – Nominated for Best Short Film at Oldenburg Film Festival
- 2022 Year on Ice (Unreleased)
