= Jack Ruby (band) =

American band

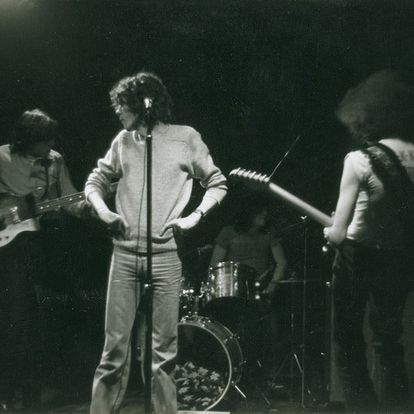

Background information
- Origin: Albany, New York, US
- Genres: No wave; proto-punk; noise rock; experimental rock
- Years active: 1973–1977
- Labels: Ugly Pop; Feeding Tube; ugEXPLODE!
- Past members: Robin Hall; Boris Policeband; George Scott III; Chris Gray; Randy Cohen

Jack Ruby was an American rock band formed in Albany, New York, in 1973. The band was named after Jack Ruby, the nightclub owner who shot and killed Lee Harvey Oswald. Jack Ruby made only five studio recordings and performed at a small number of gigs between 1973 and 1977. They have been regarded as early and influential pioneers in the New York no wave scene.

== Background ==
Jack Ruby formed in Albany, New York, in the summer of 1973. The original lineup included vocalist Robin "Robby" Hall, guitarist Chris Gray, synthesist and drummer Randy Cohen, and violist Boris Policeband who played viola through an FM transmitter and strapped police walkie-talkies around his waist. After relocating to New York City, the band added bassist George Scott III and a second vocalist, Stephen Barth.

The band drew inspiration from proto-punk artists like the Velvet Underground and the Stooges, as well as avant-garde composers like Steve Reich and Iannis Xenakis. They rehearsed regularly at Matrix Studios on 27th Street, where early supporters like Lydia Lunch and James Chance gathered, sometimes in crowds so large the studio banned guests. Thurston Moore would later talk about Jack Ruby stating:

This was a band whispered about from the most inner circle of no-wave knowledge, as they pre-dated a lot of the aesthetic weirdness and wild style of so much of that scene.

Although, the group never officially released music during its lifetime. Jack Ruby recorded five studio tracks between 1974 and 1977, including "Hit and Run," "Mayonnaise," and "Bored Stiff." These sessions, done in professional Manhattan studios, were met with confusion from engineers and disinterest from labels. Epic Records passed on their demo, and Paul Nelson, who once signed the New York Dolls, called them "the Velvet Underground in a car crash."

Randy Cohen left the band in 1974 to become a writer; Boris also departed shortly after. The group finally dissolved in 1977, with its members moving onto other projects. Robin Hall formed the band W-2, while George Scott joined James Chance and the Contortions and co-founded the Raybeats and 8-Eyed Spy.

== Revival ==
In 2011, a resurgence of interest in Jack Ruby began when Gary Reese, a former roommate of bassist George Scott III, wanting to pay tribute to him by releasing music for his first ever project, connected with Robin Hall and unearthed some long-lost recordings. Reese then connected Hall with Weasel Walter, a well-known New York City avant-garde musician and owner of the UgEXPLODE record label. Walter released those songs on a CD on his label. Simultaneously, a French label released a single of "Hit and Run" b/w "Bad Teeth." Rediscovered rehearsal tapes and a collection of recordings found in a storage space rented by Randy Cohen's mother indirectly led to a 2014 double CD release on Chris Campion's Saint Cecelia Knows Label and a two album release on Thurston Moore's Feeding Tube Records. These recordings were produced by Don Fleming and featured a Boris Policeband composition "Mayonnaise," which was thought to have been lost forever. These releases resulted in widespread media coverage including a long feature in the Guardian by Thurston Moore.

== Legacy ==
Martin Scorsese's HBO series Vinyl drew inspiration from the band. The character arc of the fictional group The Nasty Bits paralleled Jack Ruby's story, with Mick Jagger's son, James Jagger, portraying a frontman inspired by Robin Hall. Notable musicians including Lee Ranaldo and Don Fleming covered Jack Ruby songs for the series.

In 2016, Lee Ranaldo and Don Fleming appeared on a live version Randy Cohen's radio show Person, Place, Thing, to discuss the 1970's New York City music scene that was the basis for Vinyl. As part of that show, Robin Hall joined Ranaldo, Fleming and several other well-known East Coast musicians to perform the Jack Ruby songs that the Nasty Bits had covered in Vinyl.

== Discography ==
=== Albums ===
- Jack Ruby CD (2011, ugEXPLODE)
- Hit and Run 2CD (2014, Saint Cecilia Knows)
- Jack Ruby LP (2014, Feeding Tube Records)

=== EPs ===
- Jack Ruby (2011, Saturday Records)
