= Human Switchboard =

American rock band

The Human Switchboard
- Origin: Cleveland, Ohio, United States
- Genres: New wave, alternative rock, indie rock
- Years active: 1977–1985
- Past members: Robert Pfeifer; Myrna Marcarian; Ron Metz; Jared Michael Nickerson; Dave Schramm; George Scott III; Doug Morgan; Kevin Hunt; Steve Calabria
- Website: HumanSwitchboard.com

Human Switchboard was an American punk rock band formed in Cleveland, Ohio in 1977. According to a Rolling Stone review, Human Switchboard "was of its time — mixing Velvet Underground guitar churn, Sixties garage-rock organ, rubbery Pere Ubu-like baselines, skronky sax and athletically spazzy drumming."

Human Switchboard consisted of singer-guitarist Robert Pfeifer, singer and Farfisa organ player Myrna Marcarian, Ron Metz on drums, Steve Calabaria, Doug Morgan and Paul Hamann on the bass.

== History ==
=== 1970s ===
The band was formed in 1977 when Robert Pfeifer met Myrna Marcarian at Syracuse University. They spent that summer back in Cleveland, where Pfeifer grew up. They, along with drummer Ron Metz, recorded an EP of four songs, enlisting David Thomas of Pere Ubu to mix the tapes. The EP was self-released during that fall.

The band next recorded their "I Gotta Know" single for Akron's Clone Records during a spring break in 1978. By this time, Pfeifer and Metz had moved to Columbus, Ohio to attend The Ohio State University. Marcarian soon followed after her year at Syracuse and the band re-formed as a three piece. After the school year ended, the band started playing shows, with its first in the basement of local Columbus High Street record store Magnolia Thunderpussy.

Soon after the summer of 1978, the band moved back to Cleveland briefly and then opened a used record store in Kent, Ohio. This store was to provide support for the band, which it did for the following three years.

In the next few months, the band started playing shows in the area and gained followings in the Kent, Akron, Dayton, Columbus, Detroit and Pittsburgh regions. In 1979, the band recorded its next single at one of the better Cleveland studios named SUMA. With the help of Kent's famed The Numbers Band (15-60-75), they recorded their next single 'Prime of My Life / In My Room', later to be released on the band's own Square label.

After the release of the single, the band met bass player Dave Schramm who helped round out the sound. Shortly thereafter, they were invited to play at Hurrah, a new wave night club in New York City. The club was impressed enough with the sound that they invited them back to play regularly. At the same time, the band also started playing other notable clubs such as Maxwell's in Hoboken, The Rat in Boston, and the 9:30 Club in Washington, DC (even though the club did not exist until 1980). They continued playing more dates in New York with a new bass player George Scott III, formerly of the 8 Eyed Spy, James White and the Blacks and The Raybeats. East Coast clubs were becoming interested in them, but they still lacked a major record release.

At this time, a fan recorded and released a bootleg with the band's blessing and help. The rough cassette recordings captured a couple of their live shows in the Akron and Kent, Ohio, area. The 1,000 copies pressed sold quickly and their following was established.

=== 1980s ===
In 1980, Rough Trade record company out of the UK took notice of the band and commissioned them to record a three track 12 inch single. The band went back to SUMA, this time with bass player Doug Morgan, and recorded two songs 'Who's Landing in My Hangar?' and 'I Can Walk Alone'. These two songs would then be backed with a re-release of 'In My Room' from the year before. The songs were recorded, but the label inexplicably recanted their offer at the last minute.

Later that year, an IRS label subsidiary name Faulty Products signed the Human Switchboard to what was to become their only studio LP. It was aptly named Who's Landing in My Hangar?. The two tracks recorded for Rough Trade were included along with eight newer tunes. The bass playing chores on the new songs was shared among two players, Paul Hamann the studio engineer and the newest band member, Steve Calabria. In 2019 a vinyl reissue of Who's Landing in My Hangar? was released. Rolling Stone called it an "absolute classic" and that "the band’s was of its time — mixing Velvet Underground guitar churn, Sixties garage-rock organ, rubbery Pere Ubu-like basslines, skronky sax and athletically spazzy drumming. Singer-guitarist Robert Pfeifer was a Lou Reed superfan; co-leader and organ player Myrna Marcarian had a husky, searching voice like Patti Smith."

Robert Pfeifer was unhappy about Faulty Products' handling of Who's Landing in My Hangar?. Distribution was haphazard; promotion was nonexistent. In a 1982 interview in The Boston Phoenix, he called such problems the “pitfalls of incompetents, not the pitfalls of independents. ... I think it’s just a lot to ask somebody to pay $8.98 for an album that they haven't heard because radio doesn’t play it, and with no advertising to inform them which three stores have the record. It was like beating your head against the wall.”

The band toured briefly around the mid-west and east coast opening for Toots & the Maytals. It was an unusual mix of sounds, but the crowds appreciated the diverse styles of the tour and paid attention to the opening band. Human Switchboard also had become a resident fixture at New York's Danceteria night club where they would remain a feature act for the next couple of years.

After the tour, the band settled into a routine of shows in friendly environments. They decided to close the store and move from Kent back to Cleveland, where they obtained an apartment in Coventry (an area made famous by Harvey Pekar). Musically, they began to experiment with more contemporary music structures. They sought out and enlisted Jared Michael Nickerson from Dayton, Ohio to play bass and offer inspiration towards the new sound they were after. Nickerson would become the band's final and longest tenured bass player.

The beat straightened out. The bass lines became funkier and once again, the band tried to gain interest from the record companies. This is when they met John Stains from Polydor Records. Polydor was on a roll at that time with hits from bands like The Waitresses and was looking to expand upon the 'new wave' sound. John helped finance demos that the band recorded over a two-week stretch in December 1983. The Switchboard would set up on the stage of CBGBs during the afternoons and recorded a series of a dozen songs onto the club's 16-track machine.

=== Breakup ===
Their recording career suddenly came to an end as Stains was let go from Polydor. Those were the last studio recordings the band ever made. One track from these recordings, "When Your Train Starts Slowing Down", was completed and released on a 1988 compilation named It's Hard to be Cool in an Uncool World (I Wanna Records).

During the band's remaining year and a half, they played regular shows at the Peppermint Lounge and CBGBs in New York, Maxwells in Hoboken and Gilleys in Dayton, Ohio.

Human Switchboard finally broke up in the spring of 1985. Some members went on to do other projects, Pfeifer went on to release a solo album entitled After Words, featuring songs such as "Knock Knock", "Success" and "I'm Better Than You".

== Discography ==
Albums:

- (1980) Human Switchboard Live (Square Records)
- (1981) Who's Landing in My Hangar? (Faulty Products)
- (1982) Coffee Break! (ROIR Records - cassette only)

EPs and singles:

- (1977) Human Switchboard - a four-song EP that contains the songs 'Fly-In", "Distemper", "Shake It Boys" and "San Francisco Nights" (Under the Rug Records)
- (1978) I Gotta Know / No! (Clone Records)
- (1979) In My Room / Prime of My Life (Square Records)
- (1982) Who's Landing In My Hangar / Saturday's Girl (Trouser Press, issue 75, July 1982 Flexi disc No. 7 )

Songs on compilations:

- (1979) "You're Much Madder Than Me" appears on Waves An Anthology Of New Music Volume 1" (Bomp Records)
- (1988) "When Your Train Starts Slowing Down" appears on Hard To Be Cool In An Uncool World" (IWanna Records)
