= Boris Policeband =

- Boris Policeband mid-1970s, photo by Roberto Masotti

Background information
- Born: Mark Perelman
- Origin: New York City, United States
- Genres: No wave; noise music
- Instruments: Viola; walkie-talkie
- Years active: 1973-1985
- Labels: Vacuum, Soul Jazz Records

Boris Policeband (born Mark Perelman, also known as Policeband or Boris Pearlman) was a no wave performer who used an electrified viola and police walkie-talkies to make noise music.

Pearlman was a classically trained violist from New York City. He studied and taught at the California Institute of the Arts (aka CalArts) in the early 1970s, where he encountered performance art influences.

1979 Boris Policeband 7" recording: Stereo / Mono

== Recordings ==
In 1979 Boris Policeband released a 7" record called Policeband: Stereo / Mono that was produced by artist Dike Blair. Policeband also was published with two tracks on the no wave recording New York Noise Vol. 3 that was released in 2006.

== Career ==
Boris Pearlman joined early no wave band Jack Ruby in 1973, playing viola "electrified...by running it through a personal FM transmitter and a bunch police Walkie-talkies that he strapped around his waist." Randy Cohen was also in the group as well as George Scott III who later played with Lydia Lunch, James Chance and John Cale (among others). Jack Ruby broke up in 1977 with no studio releases.

He became known as Boris Policeband after a live performance in 1976 during which he monitored, on headphones, police communications from a scanner and recited their chatter while he accompanied himself on electric violin. Boris Policeband performed at CBGBs, Max's Kansas City, the Mudd Club, Tier 3, The Kitchen and Artists Space. In 1985, he appeared as the performing sidekick to Willoughby Sharp on The Willoughby Sharp Show that broadcast on public-access television Channel D on Manhattan Cable Television.

Boris, a self-proclaimed materialistic-socialist who practiced antidisestablishmentarianism, was a downtown post-punk club fixture. His days were spent combing through SoHo art galleries, as he was fascinated with conceptual art, and Lower East Side pawnshops for material to add to his collection of used books, sunglasses (which he was never seen without), and wristwatches. Every night he was in no wave clubs, like CBGBs, Tier 3 and the Mudd Club, where he leaned against a wall while listening to classical music with an ear plug on his transistor radio while engaging in snappy repartee and/or swapping insults with other club goers.

== Legacy ==
Boris Policeband appears in the film that Coleen Fitzgibbon and Alan W. Moore created in 1978 (finished in 2009) of a no wave concert to benefit Colab called X Magazine Benefit that documents a performance of Boris Policeband, along with those of DNA and James Chance and the Contortions. Shot in black and white super-8 the film captures the gritty look and sound of the music scene during that era. In 2013 it was exhibited at Salon 94, an art gallery in New York City.

In 1978 Sylvère Lotringer conducted a one-page interview with Policeband (with a one-page photo) in Columbia University's philosophy department publication of Semiotext(e) called Schizo-Culture: The Event, The Book.

Perelman, a self-proclaimed Materialistic-Socialist and Antidisestablishmentotalitarian, ended the Policeband project in the mid-80s to pursue classical viola and died sometime after 1986 and before 2011, possibly near Los Angeles, from complications related to a congenital heart condition.

== Footnotes ==
- Carlo McCormick, The Downtown Book: The New York Art Scene, 1974–1984, Princeton University Press, 2006
- Masters, Marc. No Wave, London: Black Dog Publishing, 2007
- Sylvère Lotringer & David Morris (Eds), Schizo-Culture: The Event, The Book, Semiotext(e), 1978, re-published in 2013, pp. 64–64

== See also ==
- Mudd Club
- Tier 3
- Just Another Asshole
- Jack Ruby
- No wave
