= Coffee break (disambiguation) =

A coffee break is a short mid-morning rest period commonly given to business employees in the United States.

Coffee break may also refer to:

- Coffee Break, a book by the National Center for Biotechnology Information
- Coffee Break!, a 1982 album by Human Switchboard
- "Coffee Break", a song from the musical How to Succeed in Business Without Really Trying
  - "Coffee Break" is also featured on the 2011 revival cast recording
- Coffee Break, a program on Lifestyle
