= My New Gun =

1992 film directed by Stacy Cochran

- Theatrical release poster
- Directed by: Stacy Cochran
- Written by: Stacy Cochran
- Produced by: Michael Flynn
- Starring: Diane Lane; James Le Gros; Stephen Collins; Tess Harper; Bruce Altman
- Cinematography: Edward Lachman
- Edited by: Camilla Toniolo
- Music by: Pat Irwin
- Production company: IRS Media
- Distributed by: IRS Media
- Release date: October 26, 1992
- Running time: 99 minutes
- Country: United States
- Language: English
- Budget: $2.1 million

My New Gun is a 1992 American black comedy film written and directed by Stacy Cochran in her debut. It stars Diane Lane, James Le Gros, Stephen Collins, and Tess Harper, and also features an early minor role for Philip Seymour Hoffman.

== Plot ==
A New Jersey doctor named Gerald buys his trophy wife, Debbie, a revolver against her wishes. Trouble ensues when their eccentric slacker neighbor, Skippy, takes the gun and doesn't want to give it back. After an accident lands Gerald in the hospital, it's up to Debbie to get the gun back and try to figure out why Skippy took it in the first place.

== Cast ==
- Diane Lane as Debbie Bender
- James Le Gros as Skippy
- Stephen Collins as Gerald Bender
- Tess Harper as Kimmy Hayes
- Bruce Altman as Irwin Bloom
- Maddie Corman as Myra
- Bill Raymond as Andrew
- Suzzy Roche as Checkout Girl
- Philip Seymour Hoffman as Chris
- Patti Chambers as Janice Phee
- Stephen Pearlman as Al Schlyen
- Leslie Brett Daniels as Waitress
- Paul J.Q. Lee as Desk Manager
- Angela Marie Baker as Maid at Ramada
- Kent Gash as Bell Hop

== Production ==
My New Gun was shot on a budget of $2.1 million, financed from IRS Media and Columbia-TriStar Home Video. It was shot on location in Teaneck, New Jersey, and a townhouse was used for the interior of multiple homes.

== Reception ==
On Rotten Tomatoes the film has an approval rating of 43% based on reviews from 7 critics.

Terrence Rafferty of The New Yorker praised Cochran's directorial debut, writing that "The assurance she shows in handling even a brief expository scene is astonishing. [...] This film school graduate has a kind of 'technique' that can't be taught. [...] The sort of liberation that My New Gun proposes, and embodies, is the product of a true filmmaker's vision".

The film was praised by another critic for its "masterfully understated structure" and eccentricities, which some considered to be influenced by Thelma and Louise or an update of Henrik Ibsen's A Doll's House.

Emanuel Levy has noted the way in which "the gifted director Stacy Cochran examines suburbia in a manner devoid of the usually nasty, mean-spirited approach to the subject", and unlike other downtown New York films, it "displays no irony or condescension; yet its quirkily laconic, minimalist perspective goes against expectations."
