= Guitar Beat =

Studio album by The Raybeats
- Released: 1981
- Recorded: April 1981, Woodcottage, Goring-On-Thames
- Genre: Surf rock, avant-garde
- Label: PVC/Passport
- Producer: Martin Rushent

The Raybeats chronology
Guitar Beat (1981)	It's Only a Movie! (1983)

Guitar Beat is the debut album by the neo-surf band the Raybeats. It was released in 1981 and produced by Martin Rushent. The album features ten original instrumentals, plus a Jan and Dean cover.

In tongue-in-cheek fashion, the original LP sleeve characterized the first side as the "listless, spotty & wasteful side" and the second as the "brave, clean & reverent side". The record sleeve also featured on the front a hand-colored photo of the band by photographer Laura Levine.

== Reception ==
Professional ratings
Review scores
Source	Rating
AllMusic	4.5/5 stars
Trouser Press	favourable

AllMusic called it "a magnificent, echo-drenched set of concise and atmospheric riff-driven tunes that in a better world would have turned up as the soundtrack for a James Bond movie directed by David Lynch."

== Track listing ==
All compositions by Pat Irwin, Jody Harris, Don Christensen and George Scott III except as indicated.

=== Side one ===
1. "Tight Turn"
2. "Big Black Sneakers"
3. "Tone Zone"
4. "The Backstroke" (Irwin, Harris, Christensen)
5. "B-Gas Rickshaw" (Jan Berry)
6. "International Operator"

=== Side two ===
1. "Searching"
2. "The Calhoun Surf" (Danny Amis)
3. "Piranha Salad"
4. "Cocktails" (Irwin, Harris, Christensen)
5. "Guitar Beat" (Irwin, Harris, Scott, Amis)

== Personnel ==
- Jody Harris - electric guitar
- Danny Amis - bass, guitar
- Pat Irwin - alto saxophone, organ, guitar
- Don Christensen - drums
