= Buy (album) =

Studio album by Contortions
- Released: 1979
- Recorded: 1978
- Genre: Punk jazz; no wave; punk funk
- Length: 30:08; 39:47 (Bonus tracks)
- Label: ZE
- Producer: James Chance

Contortions chronology
Buy (1979)	Live aux Bains Douches (1980)

Buy is the debut studio album by American no wave band Contortions. It was released in 1979 through ZE Records following the band's inclusion on the 1978 compilation No New York.

== Background ==
Fashion designer, band manager, collaborator, and girlfriend of frontman Anya Phillips photographed Terence Sellers wearing an outfit designed by Phillips for the album's cover artwork.

== Critical reception ==
Professional ratings
Review scores
Source	Rating
AllMusic	4.5/5 stars
DownBeat	5/5 stars
Entertainment Weekly	B+
Mojo	4/5 stars
Record Collector	4/5 stars
Spin Alternative Record Guide	7/10
Uncut	8/10
The Village Voice	B+

For The Village Voice, critic Robert Christgau stated that "in theory James White's music is better without the words: you get the jagged rhythms and tonic off-harmonies without being distracted by his 'ideas,'" but added that "in fact the music is so (deliberately) stunted it needs a voice for sonic muscle, and James's lyrics do have a certain petty honesty and jerk-off humor."

All About Jazz critic Trevor MacLaren wrote that "through the anger and aggression Chance made a solid record that had a sound like nothing before or since," describing the album as "a great disc that sounds as original and cutting edge as when it was released." Dean McFarlane of AllMusic stated that Chance "never quite topped the warped distillation of punk, funk, and free jazz presented here, making Buy a pivotal recording of the New York post-punk era." In the DownBeat review, Larry Birnbaum wrote, "White's Jagger-cum-JB vocals are closely meshed with pungent sax squiggles over a throbbing metal rhythm matrix".

== Track listing ==
All tracks are written by James Chance.

No.	Title	Length
1.	"Design to Kill"	2:48
2.	"My Infatuation"	2:21
3.	"I Don't Want to Be Happy"	3:23
4.	"Anesthetic"	3:54
5.	"Contort Yourself"	4:25
6.	"Throw Me Away"	2:45
7.	"Roving Eye"	3:10
8.	"Twice Removed"	3:05
9.	"Bedroom Athlete"	4:17

Bonus tracks recorded at CBGB's, Spring 1978
No.	Title	Writer(s)	Length
10.	"Throw Me Away" (Live)		3:04
11.	"Twice Removed" (Live)		3:12
12.	"Jailhouse Rock" (Live)	Jerry Leiber, Mike Stoller	3:23

== Personnel ==
- James Chance – vocals, alto saxophone, keyboards
- David Hofstra– bass
- Don Christensen – drums
- Jody Harris – guitar
- Pat Place – slide guitar
- George Scott III – bass (tracks: 10 to 12)
- Adele Bertei – Ace Tone organ (tracks: 10 to 12)
