= Jack Ruby (disambiguation) =

Jack Ruby (1911–1967) was an American nightclub owner who killed Lee Harvey Oswald.

Jack Ruby may also refer to:

- Jack Ruby (music producer) (1943–1989), Jamaican record producer and sound system operator
- Jack Ruby (band), American rock band
- "Jack Ruby", song by Camper Van Beethoven from the album Key Lime Pie (album)
- "Jack Ruby", song by Deep Purple from the album Abandon (album)

== See also ==
- Jack Ruby Shoots Lee Harvey Oswald, photograph taken in 1963
- Ruby (1992 film), a film about Jack Ruby
