= Boys (1996 film) =

- Theatrical release poster
- Directed by: Stacy Cochran
- Written by: Stacy Cochran
- Based on: "Twenty Minutes" by James Salter
- Produced by: Paul Feldsher; Peter Frankfurt; Erica Huggins
- Starring: Winona Ryder; Lukas Haas; Wiley Wiggins; John C. Reilly; James LeGros; Skeet Ulrich
- Cinematography: Robert Elswit
- Edited by: Camilla Toniolo
- Music by: Stewart Copeland
- Production companies: Touchstone Pictures; Interscope Communications; PolyGram Filmed Entertainment
- Distributed by: Buena Vista Pictures Distribution (United States and Canada); PolyGram Filmed Entertainment (International)
- Release date: May 10, 1996
- Running time: 86 minutes
- Country: United States
- Language: English
- Box office: $516,350

Boys is a 1996 American film starring Winona Ryder and Lukas Haas. It is based very loosely on the short story "Twenty Minutes" by James Salter.

The film is set in an East Coast boys' boarding school, and was shot in Baltimore and on the campus of St. John's College in Annapolis, Maryland.

== Plot ==
John Baker Jr. is a boy bored with life at an upper-middle-class boarding school, and a future running the family grocery store chain. Close to graduating, no longer seeing the point in school, he finds his life turned upside down after rescuing a young woman he finds unconscious in a field. The woman, Patty Vare, regains consciousness that evening in John's dormitory, and the two embark on a romantic voyage of self-discovery.

The relationship is not without its problems, as other boys in the dorm soon discover Patty's presence. Baker's 'best friend' becomes enraged during an argument, punching a wall and breaking his hand.

Meanwhile, flashbacks to Vare's past show her stealing a car with a famous baseball player. When the accomplice is subsequently killed in a drunken crash, authorities seek out Patty. In time, Vare reveals this history to Baker, as well as revealing the site of the crash and the man's body to investigators.

At the police station, Baker and Vare are confronted by Baker's controlling father just as they are saying goodbye. The couple escapes into an elevator, and drive off in a stolen car.

== Cast ==
- Winona Ryder as Patty Vare
- Lukas Haas as John Baker Jr.
- John C. Reilly as Officer Kellogg Curry
- James LeGros as Fenton Ray
- Skeet Ulrich as Bud Valentine
- Chris Cooper as John Baker Sr., John's father
- Spencer Vrooman as John Murphy
- Charlie Hofheimer as John Cooke
- Bill Sage as Officer Bill Martone
- Wiley Wiggins as John Phillips
- Russell Young as John Van Slieder
- Christopher Pettiet as Jon Heinz
- Catherine Keener as Jilly
- Maddie Corman as Liz Curry
- Jessica Harper as Mrs. Baker, John's mother
- Rob Carlton as Tom Vare
- Matt Malloy as Bartender
- Marty McDonough as Teacher
- Vivienne Shub as Frances
- Andy Davis as Jonathan Marco

== Reception ==
After "a dispute with her studio led to an extensive involuntary editing process," director Cochran commented that "much of the original intent and beauty of the film had been lost, due to studio interference."

The film received negative reviews from critics. Terrence Rafferty of The New Yorker wrote, "Boys, subjected to self-fulfilling negative buzz, has received lukewarm-to-terrible reviews and has done no business. It deserves better. [...] Cochran is too eccentric to make a conventional comedy, yet unfortunately (in marketing terms), her style is too subtle and uninsistent to place her among the aggressively hip, genre-bending filmmakers of the Tarantino generation. The funny thing is, this young filmmaker may have a more deeply subversive sensibility than any of her celebrated peers." Boys holds a rating of 15% on Rotten Tomatoes from 27 reviews. The site's consensus states "Winona Ryder's femme fatale proves to be a blank cipher in Boys, a mystery with an intriguing hook that quickly fizzles into teenage ennui."

== Official soundtrack ==
The soundtrack to the film was released on April 9, 1996.

1. "She's Not There" – Cruel Sea
2. "Alright" – Cast
3. "Gotta Know Right Now" – Smoking Popes
4. "Honeysimple" – Scarce
5. "Wildwood" (Sheared Wood Mix) – Paul Weller, remixed by Portishead
6. "Colored Water" – Orbit
7. "Sad & Beautiful World" – Sparklehorse
8. "Fading Fast" – Kelly Willis
9. "Tell Her This" – Del Amitri
10. "If I Didn't Love You" – Squeeze
11. "Inside" – Slider
12. "Wait for the Sun" – Supergrass
13. "Belly Laugh" – Compulsion
14. "Begging You" – The Stone Roses
15. "Evade Chums" – Stewart Copeland
