= Vivienne Dick =

Experimental and documentary film director

- Born: 1950 (age 75–76); Donegal, Ireland
- Education: University College Dublin
- Occupations: Filmmaker, Lecturer

Vivienne Dick (born 1950) is an Irish feminist experimental and documentary filmmaker. Her early films helped define the No Wave scene. According to The Irish Times, Dick is "one of the most important film-makers Ireland has produced".

== Biography ==
Dick was born in Donegal and grew up in Ireland during the 1950s, attending University College Dublin there in the 1960s. After travels in Europe, India and Mexico, she emigrated to the United States in 1975. She relocated to London in the mid-1980s and returned to Ireland in the mid-1990s. Dick currently lives in Galway and teaches filmmaking at Galway-Mayo Institute of Technology.

== Career ==
Upon her arrival in the U.S., Dick became an integral figure in No Wave film culture and produced a series of seminal Super8 short films. Living in New York, which was undergoing a recession and an inexpensive place to live, many of her films were staged around well-known sites such as Coney Island, the Statue of Liberty, and the World Trade Center. The films featured punk performers such as Lydia Lunch, Pat Place (of the band Bush Tetras) and Adele Bertei (of The Contortions). Film critic and author J. Hoberman has called Dick the "quintessential No Wave filmmaker".

After leaving the United States, Dick's work took on a more political tone. She was an active member of the London Filmmakers Coop during her time in the city. Her 2014 film, The Irreducible Difference of the Other, acknowledges her longstanding interest in Luce Irigaray. Her work is examined in the 2010 documentary Blank City, which discusses the No Wave movement. Her name appears in the lyrics of the Le Tigre song "Hot Topic."

Dick's work formed part of two major retrospectives of American avant-garde film: No Wave Cinema 1978-87 (1996) at the Whitney Museum, New York and Big as Life: An American History of Super8 Film (1999) at the Museum of Modern Art, New York and the Philadelphia Museum of Art. Vivienne's work was the subject of a retrospective at the Crawford Arts Centre, with an accompanying monograph co-published by the Crawford Arts Centre and the LUX Tate Modern, London in late 2010. It included a collection of her remarkable films and included a performance by Lydia Lunch as well as discussions with Nan Goldin, Claire Pajaczkowska, and Maeve Connolly, as well as films by other artists selected by Dick.

"In 2017 IMMA presented 93% STARDUST, a survey exhibition of Dick's work."

== Films ==
- DVD, Afterimages 4 : Vivienne Dick, Lux. Comprenant : Guerillére Talks, 1978, 24 min; She Had Her Gun Already, 1978, 28 min; Staten Island, 1978, 4 min.
- 2016. Felis Catus, 5:30 min
- 2015. Red Moon Rising, 15:00 min
- 2013. The Irreducible Difference of the Other
- 2005. Molecular Moments
- 2004. Saccade
- 2002. Excluded by the Nature of Things, DVD pour trois écrans
- 1999. Two Be Two
- 1994. A Skinny Little Man Attacked Daddy
- 1992. New York Conversations
- 1990. Two Pigeons
- 1989. London Suite
- 1988. Images: Ireland
- 1988. Pobal-Portrait of an Artist
- 1986. Rothach
- 1983. Trailer
- 1983. Like Dawn to Dusk
- 1982. Loisaida
- 1981. Visibility: Moderate
- 1980. Liberty's Booty
- 1979. Beauty Becomes the Beast
- 1978. She Had Her Gun All Ready
- 1978. Staten Island
- 1978. Guerillere Talks
