= Fan Girl (2015 film) =

Film by Paul Jarrett

- Promotional poster
- Directed by: Paul Jarrett
- Written by: Gina O'Brien
- Produced by: Nick Huston; Paul Jarrett; Adam Spielberg
- Starring: Kiernan Shipka; Meg Ryan; Kathleen Schipelliti; All Time Low
- Cinematography: Brian Burgoyne; Tim Gillis
- Edited by: Phyllis Housen
- Distributed by: ABC Family
- Release dates: June 15, 2015 (LA Film Festival); October 3, 2015 (United States)
- Running time: 100 minutes
- Country: United States
- Language: English

Fan Girl is a 2015 American teen comedy film directed by Paul Jarrett. The film stars Kiernan Shipka as Telulah Farrow, Meg Ryan as Telulah's mother, Mary Farrow, and the pop punk band All Time Low as themselves. It had its world premiere at the LA Film Festival on June 15, 2015, before airing on ABC Family on October 3, 2015.

== Premise ==
A high school sophomore with a passion for filmmaking sets out to make a film about her favorite band, All Time Low, and enter it in her school's film competition.

== Cast ==
- Kiernan Shipka as Telulah "Lu" Farrow
- All Time Low as themselves
- Meg Ryan as Mary Farrow
- Tess Frazer as Claire Bovary
- Kara Hayward as Jamie
- Joshua Boone as Darvan
- Pico Alexander as Charlie
- Nicole Coulon as Holly
- Danny Flaherty as Hashtag
- Frederick Buford as Joey
- Scott Adsit as Paul
- Nadia Alexander as Kim
- Beanie Feldstein as Anna
- Annie Q. as Rosemarie
- Jon-Christina Martin Costable as Riley
- Roy Jackson as Mr. Somma
- Catherine Curtin as Miss Stacy
- Samantha Carroll as Fan Girl
- Torun Esmaeili as High Pony Girl
- Bridget Megan Clark as Charlotte
- Dylan Hartigan as Zack
- Cory Jeacoma as Mr. Edwards
- Déa Julien as Miranda
- Kristopher Kling as Pete (as Kris Kling)
- James Lipton as Principal
- Kevin Ho as Hipster
- Emily Morden as Jamie's sister
- Lance Roberts as Johnson
- Larry Saperstein as Lucius
- Bill Sage as Mike Bovary
- Geoff Schuppert as Mr. Goldfarb
- David Shih as Bus Driver
- Shiori Ichikawa as Obey Girl
- Ted Sutherland as Scene Boy
