= Write When You Get Work =

- Directed by: Stacy Cochran
- Written by: Stacy Cochran
- Produced by: Alison Beckett; Adam Gibbs; Jesse Ozeri; Stacy Cochran
- Starring: Finn Wittrock; Rachel Keller; Scott Cohen; Jessica Hecht; Emily Mortimer
- Cinematography: Robert Elswit
- Edited by: Nicholas Ramirez
- Release date: March 12, 2018 (SXSW)
- Running time: 99 minutes
- Country: United States
- Language: English

Write When You Get Work is a 2018 American comedy drama film written and directed by Stacy Cochran and starring Finn Wittrock, Rachel Keller, Scott Cohen, Jessica Hecht and Emily Mortimer. The film follows Ruth, a South Brooklyn native working at a Manhattan private school for girls, who becomes involved in a plot to help out the daughter of a less privileged family.

== Plot ==
Ruth Duffy is working to establish a clean slate on the lower rungs of the Upper East Side, having left a life of petty crime. She currently works as an "interim" in the admissions office of an exclusive private school. The student body of the school is mostly white, as the costs of attending the school prevents children from less privileged backgrounds from attending. Ruth's attempts to go straight are complicated when one day, she runs into Jonny, her high school boyfriend who still engages in robbery. Jonny works his way back into Ruth's life and concocts a scheme to target Nan Noble, the snooty wife of a legally imperiled hedge-fund manager.

== Cast ==
- Finn Wittrock as Jonny Collins
- Rachel Keller as Ruth Duffy
- Emily Mortimer as Nan Noble
- James Ransone as Steven Noble
- Adele Kader as Dorset Noble
- Hermione Heckrich as Murphy Noble
- Jessica Hecht as Ellen Hazard
- Scott Cohen as Guy Brinckerhoff
- Jennifer Mudge as Babe Brinckerhoff
- Tess Frazer as Ashley Spradlin
- Tonya Pinkins as Roberta Simmons

== Production ==
Write When You Get Work was shot in New York City's Upper East Side and under the Throgs Neck Bridge in the waterfront neighborhood of Locust Point. The movie was shot on Super 16mm film in 20 days by Oscar-winning cinematographer Robert Elswit.

== Critical reception ==
Vox Magazine commented, "The film successfully explores multiple viewpoints and systemic issues, which eventually comes together in the films conclusion making for a stunning finish. Cochran finds a way to make the individual storylines and details that seem unrelated form a perfect fit." Jeannette Catsoulis of The New York Times criticized the characters as "unappealing" and the story as not credible, writing the film "presents rich folk as gullible idiots and blue-collar crooks as heroes." However, she praised the cinematography by Elswit, saying his "sensuously shot opening sequence alone almost carried me through to the end."

Sheila O'Malley of RogerEbert.com wrote, "There are some interesting things going on, and some insight into New York's economic hierarchy, but the film veers off into a hard-to-believe crime heist, and, ultimately, none of it really hangs together." O'Malley complimented Wittrock, saying that he convincingly pulls off an "amoral" role. Of Mortimer, O'Malley commented she is "a jangly mess of nerves and irritation [and] plays so compellingly terrible a character—filled with the self-pitying rage of the rich—that she is the most watchable thing in the movie. Nan is not a stereotype." She also lauded the cinematography, writing "Elswit captures New York's mercurial personality, how it changes in different lights, be it harsh morning light or the monochromatic blues of dusk. Sometimes the streets feel expansive, sometimes they feel desolate and empty. It's a great-looking film, entrenched in a specific sense of place." Richard Brody of The New Yorker was more positive, writing "The core of the film is Ruth and Jonny's backstory, which is dosed out in frustrating droplets but is nonetheless affecting."

On review aggregate website Rotten Tomatoes, Write When You Get Work has an approval rating of 38% based on 21 reviews.
