= Robert Elswit =

American cinematographer

- Born: Robert Christopher Elswit; Los Angeles, California, U.S.
- Education: University of Southern California (BFA); American Film Institute (MFA)
- Years active: 1977–present
- Relatives: Rik Elswit (brother)

Robert Christopher Elswit, ASC is an American cinematographer.

He is best known for his collaboration with director Paul Thomas Anderson from 1996 to 2014, winning the Academy Award for Best Cinematography for There Will Be Blood (2007).

Elswit has also collaborated with directors and screenwriters Tony and Dan Gilroy on all of the six films that either brother directed.

== Early life and education ==
Elswit was born in Los Angeles. His brother is musician Rik Elswit.

He is a graduate of the USC School of Cinematic Arts and worked there as a teaching assistant.

Elswit has cited filmmaker John Cassavetes as a major influence.

== Career ==
His early work on was the 1982 television adaptation of Ray Bradbury's short story All Summer in a Day. He worked as a visual effects camera operator at John Dykstra's Apogee Productions Inc. and Industrial Light & Magic, including Star Trek: The Motion Picture, The Empire Strikes Back, E.T. the Extra-Terrestrial, and Return of the Jedi, before shooting made-for-television films and shows.

He shot his black and white, Oscar nominated film Good Night, and Good Luck. He first shot the film in color, and then converted the film into black and white in post production. According to Elswit, the technique preserved the subtlety of the colors (as complex shades of blacks and greys) and made the overall look much richer in the final film. His work earned him a nomination for the Academy Award for Best Cinematography.

He later won the award for There Will Be Blood in 2008.

Elswit is a self-described traditionalist in shooting technique, and has been a fierce defender of film cameras, avoiding using digital cameras whenever possible, claiming that they have "no texture, no grain", though he started shooting digitally with Nightcrawler.

== Personal life ==
Elswit is the godfather to the actor Jake Gyllenhaal; he worked with Jake's father Stephen Gyllenhaal early in his career.

== Filmography ==
=== Television ===
Year	Title	Director	Notes
1980	CBS Library	Seth Pinsker; Sam Weiss	Episode "The Incredible Book Escape"
1985	CBS Schoolbreak Special	Michael Toshiyuki Uno	Episode "The War Between the Classes"
1989	Dream Street	Mark Rosner	Episode "Pilot"
1992	Human Target	Max Tash	Episode "Pilot"
1997	Prince Street	Roger Spottiswoode	Episode "Pilot"
2016	The Night Of	Steven Zaillian	Episode "The Beach"

Miniseries

Year	Title	Director
2024	Ripley	Steven Zaillian
2026	The Boys from Brazil	Alex Gabassi

TV movies

Year	Title	Director	Notes
1982	All Summer in a Day	Ed Kaplan	
1983	Tiger Town	Alan Shapiro	
1984	A Single Light	Karl Epstein	
1986	The Children of Times Square	Curtis Hanson	
1987	A Different Affair	Noel Nosseck	
1987	Long Gone	Martin Davidson	
1987	Into the Homeland	Lesli Linka Glatter	
1989	Double Exposure: The Story of Margaret Bourke-White	Lawrence Schiller	
1990	A Killing in a Small Town	Stephen Gyllenhaal	
1990	Steel Magnolias	Thomas Schlamme	
1990	Opposites Attract	Noel Nosseck	
1991	Prison Stories: Women on the Inside	Donna Deitch; Joan Micklin Silver	Segments "Esperanza" and "Parole Board"
1991	The Summer My Father Grew Up	Michael Tuchner	
1991	Paris Trout	Stephen Gyllenhaal	
1991	Vidiots	Howard Storm	
1992	A Murderous Affair: The Carolyn Warmus Story	Martin Davidson	
2026	The Punisher: One Last Kill	Reinaldo Marcus Green	TV special

Key
†	Denotes titles that have not yet been released

=== Feature film ===
Year	Title	Director	Notes
1981	The End of August	Bob Graham	
1982	Waltz Across Texas	Ernest Day	
1983	Summerspell	Lina Shanklin	
1985	The Sure Thing	Rob Reiner	
1985	Moving Violations	Neal Israel	
1985	Desert Hearts	Donna Deitch	
1986	Trick or Treat	Charles Martin Smith	
1987	Amazing Grace and Chuck	Mike Newell	
1988	Return of the Living Dead Part II	Ken Wiederhorn	
1989	How I Got into College	Savage Steve Holland	
1989	Heart of Dixie	Martin Davidson	
1990	Bad Influence	Curtis Hanson	
1992	The Hand That Rocks the Cradle	Curtis Hanson	
1992	Waterland	Stephen Gyllenhaal	
1993	A Dangerous Woman	Stephen Gyllenhaal	
1994	The River Wild	Curtis Hanson	
1996	Hard Eight	Paul Thomas Anderson	
1996	The Pallbearer	Matt Reeves	
1996	Boys	Stacy Cochran	
1997	Boogie Nights	Paul Thomas Anderson	
1997	Tomorrow Never Dies	Roger Spottiswoode	
1999	8mm	Joel Schumacher	
1999	Magnolia	Paul Thomas Anderson	
2000	Bounce	Don Roos	
2001	Heist	David Mamet	
2001	Impostor	Gary Fleder	
2002	Punch-Drunk Love	Paul Thomas Anderson	
2003	Behind the Red Door	Matia Karrell	
2003	Gigli	Martin Brest	
2003	Runaway Jury	Gary Fleder	
2005	Good Night, and Good Luck	George Clooney	
2005	Syriana	Stephen Gaghan	
2006	American Dreamz	Paul Weitz	
2007	Michael Clayton	Tony Gilroy	
2007	There Will Be Blood	Paul Thomas Anderson	
2008	Redbelt	David Mamet	
2008	The Burning Plain	Guillermo Arriaga	
2009	Duplicity	Tony Gilroy	
2009	The Men Who Stare at Goats	Grant Heslov	
2010	The Town	Ben Affleck	
2010	Salt	Phillip Noyce	
2011	Mission: Impossible – Ghost Protocol	Brad Bird	
2012	The Bourne Legacy	Tony Gilroy	
2014	Inherent Vice	Paul Thomas Anderson	
2014	Nightcrawler	Dan Gilroy	
2015	Mission: Impossible – Rogue Nation	Christopher McQuarrie	
2016	Gold	Stephen Gaghan	
2017	Suburbicon	George Clooney	
2017	Roman J. Israel, Esq.	Dan Gilroy	
2018	Skyscraper	Rawson Marshall Thurber	
2018	Write When You Get Work	Stacy Cochran	
2019	Velvet Buzzsaw	Dan Gilroy	
2020	The King of Staten Island	Judd Apatow	
2021	King Richard	Reinaldo Marcus Green	
2024	Bob Marley: One Love	Reinaldo Marcus Green	
2025	Ella McCay	James L. Brooks	
2026	Animals †	Ben Affleck	Post-production

== Awards and nominations ==
=== Major awards ===
Year	Award	Category	Title	Result	Ref.
2005	Academy Awards	Best Cinematography	Good Night, and Good Luck	Nominated	
2007	Academy Awards	Best Cinematography	There Will Be Blood	Won	
2005	American Society of Cinematographers	Outstanding Cinematography	Good Night, and Good Luck	Nominated	
2007	American Society of Cinematographers	Outstanding Cinematography	There Will Be Blood	Won	
2007	BAFTA Awards	Best Cinematography	There Will Be Blood	Nominated	
2007	British Society of Cinematographers	Best Cinematography	There Will Be Blood	Nominated	
2005	Camerimage	Golden Frog Award	Good Night, and Good Luck	Nominated	
1984	Daytime Emmy Award	Outstanding Achievement in Cinematography	CBS Schoolbreak Special ("The War Between The Classes")	Won	
1997	Independent Spirit Awards	Best Cinematography	Hard Eight	Nominated	
2005	Independent Spirit Awards	Best Cinematography	Good Night, and Good Luck	Won	
2024	Primetime Emmy Awards	Outstanding Cinematography for a Limited or Anthology Series or Movie	Ripley ("V Lucio")	Won	
2005	Satellite Awards	Best Cinematography	Good Night, and Good Luck	Nominated	
2007	Satellite Awards	Best Cinematography	There Will Be Blood	Nominated	
2010	Satellite Awards	Best Cinematography	Salt	Nominated	
2014	Satellite Awards	Best Cinematography	Inherent Vice	Nominated	

=== Critics awards ===
Year	Award	Category	Title	Result
2007	Austin Film Critics Association	Best Cinematography	There Will Be Blood	Won
2005	Boston Society of Film Critics	Best Cinematography	Good Night, and Good Luck	Won
2005	Chicago Film Critics Association	Best Cinematography	Good Night, and Good Luck	Nominated
2007	Chicago Film Critics Association	Best Cinematography	There Will Be Blood	Nominated
2014	Chicago Film Critics Association	Best Cinematography	Inherent Vice	Nominated
2014	Houston Film Critics Society	Best Cinematography	Inherent Vice	Nominated
2005	Los Angeles Film Critics Association	Best Cinematography	Good Night, and Good Luck	Won
2007	Los Angeles Film Critics Association	Best Cinematography	There Will Be Blood	2nd place
2002	National Society of Film Critics	Best Cinematography	Punch-Drunk Love	3rd place
2005	National Society of Film Critics	Best Cinematography	Good Night, and Good Luck	2nd place
2007	National Society of Film Critics	Best Cinematography	There Will Be Blood	Won
2005	New York Film Critics Circle	Best Cinematography	Good Night, and Good Luck	2nd place
2007	New York Film Critics Circle	Best Cinematography	There Will Be Blood	Won
2005	Online Film Critics Society	Best Cinematography	Good Night, and Good Luck	Nominated
2007	Online Film Critics Society	Best Cinematography	There Will Be Blood	Nominated
2014	Utah Film Critics Association	Best Cinematography	Nightcrawler	Won
2007	San Diego Film Critics Society	Best Cinematography	There Will Be Blood	2nd place
2014	San Diego Film Critics Society	Best Cinematography	Nightcrawler	Won
2005	St. Louis Film Critics Association	Best Cinematography	Good Night, and Good Luck	Nominated
2007	St. Louis Film Critics Association	Best Cinematography	There Will Be Blood	Nominated
2014	St. Louis Film Critics Association	Best Cinematography	Nightcrawler	Nominated

=== Other awards ===
Year	Award	Category	Title	Result
1988	CableACE Award	Best Cinematography	Long Gone	Nominated
2007	International Online Cinema Awards	Best Cinematography	There Will Be Blood	Nominated
