= Beauty Lies =

Studio album by Bush Tetras
- Released: 1997
- Genre: Post-punk
- Label: Tim/Kerr
- Producer: Nona Hendryx

Bush Tetras chronology
Boom in the Night: Original Studio Recordings 1980-1983 (1996)	Beauty Lies (1997)	Very Very Happy (2007)

Beauty Lies is an album by the American band Bush Tetras, released in 1997. It was the band's first album, as their 1980s output had consisted solely of EPs and singles. All four original members participated in the reunion.

== Production ==
The album was produced by Nona Hendryx; Henry Rollins had produced the band's first two singles after the band reunited. Hendryx and Darlene Love provided backing vocals on Beauty Lies. "World Dub" is a hidden track.

== Critical reception ==
Professional ratings
Review scores
Source	Rating
AllMusic	4/5 stars
Los Angeles Daily News	3/4 stars
MusicHound Rock: The Essential Album Guide	3/5 stars
The Plain Dealer	B+
The San Diego Union-Tribune	2/4 stars
San Francisco Examiner	3/5 stars

Stereo Review wrote that "the band has improved slightly on Beauty Lies, the first decently produced recording in its history... The approach is a bit more rock and less funk nowadays." Rolling Stone deemed the album "incredibly tight, hardheaded, muscular, confident, hooky and funny." The San Diego Union-Tribune opined that "the songs are often shallow, jagged little pills that start out big and fail to deliver any substance."

The Los Angeles Daily News thought that Beauty Lies "finds the band in top form, still turning out funky pop gems powered by Pat Place's slash-and-burn guitar." The Telegram & Gazette determined that "the band's deep-groove sense of rhythm gives it a distinctive sound, and its mix of whimsical and menacing lyrics straddles the best of punk rock's dueling interests: the abilities to incite and brush off." The Dayton Daily News concluded that "there's a lot of anger and screeching, not to be confused with angry screeching, on Bush Tetras' Beauty Lies ... the difference between the two being that with all the metal-pop catharsis that spills from these songs, the band can't have anything to be hacked off about anymore."

AllMusic wrote that "Place's guitar is more controlled and less slashing, though she can still work up a good old art-noise head of steam."

== Track listing ==
No.	Title	Length
1.	"Mr. Love Song"
2.	"Page 18"
3.	"Dirty Little Secret"
4.	"Beauty Lies"
5.	"Color Green"
6.	"Satan Is a Bummer"
7.	"Silver Chain"
8.	"The Ballad"
9.	"Mental Mishap"
10.	"Find a Lie"
11.	"Basement Babies"
12.	"World"
13.	"World Dub"
