= Who's Landing in My Hangar? =

Studio album by Human Switchboard
- Released: 1981
- Recorded: 1981, Suma Studios, Cleveland
- Genre: New wave; punk rock
- Length: 38:21
- Label: I.R.S. Records
- Producer: Paul Hamann

Human Switchboard chronology
Human Switchboard Live (1980)	Who's Landing in My Hangar? (1981)	Coffee Break! (1982)

Who's Landing in My Hangar? was the 1981 debut studio album by American rock band Human Switchboard.

== Critical reception ==
Professional ratings
Review scores
Source	Rating
AllMusic	4.5/5 stars
The Village Voice	A

Writing in The Boston Phoenix, critic Kit Rachlis opined that "Who’s Landing in My Hangar? is one of the smartest, most emotionally convincing, most compact American new-wave albums ever made. Human Switchboard has come up with a sound so sturdy and agile that it might be called streamlined garage." Trouser Press wrote that Bob Pfeifer "creates a neurotic, high-strung persona that makes for gripping listening." The album was voted the 11th best record of the year in The Village Voice's annual Pazz & Jop poll of American critics.

== Track listing ==
All songs written by Bob Pfeifer, except where noted.

=== Side one ===
1. "(Say No To) Saturday's Girl" – 3:50 (Bob Pfeifer / Myrna Marcarian)
2. "Who's Landing in My Hangar?" – 2:38
3. "In This Town" – 3:15
4. "No Heart" – 3:16
5. "Refrigerator Door" – 7:30

=== Side two ===
1. "I Can Walk Alone" – 3:02 (Bob Pfeifer / Myrna Marcarian)
2. "(I Used To) Believe in You" – 3:57
3. "Don't Follow Me Home" – 4:33
4. "Book on Looks" – 2:35
5. "Where the Light Breaks" – 3:53

== Personnel ==
- Bob Pfeifer - vocals, guitar
- Myrna Marcarian - Farfisa organ, vocals
- Ron Metz - drums
- Steve Calabaria - bass
- Doug Morgan - bass
- Paul Hamann - bass
