= Human Switchboard Live =

Live album by Human Switchboard
- Released: 1980
- Recorded: 1980
- Genre: New wave
- Label: Square Two

Human Switchboard chronology
Human Switchboard Live (1980)	Who's Landing in My Hangar? (1982)

Professional ratings
Review scores
Source	Rating
AllMusic	3/5 stars

Human Switchboard Live was the first album by Human Switchboard.

According to an insert, the album was a very limited fanclub edition recording of 1000 units and was taken from a May '80 Kent Performance & an August '79 performance.

== Track listing ==
All songs written by Bob Pfeifer, except where noted.

=== Side one ===
1. I Can Walk Alone (Bob Pfeifer / Myrna Marcarian)
2. (I Used To) Believe in You
3. City
4. Sharpest Girl
5. No Heart
6. I Gotta Know
7. Book On Looks

=== Side two ===
1. Time, Time, Time
2. Who's Landing in My Hangar?
3. Frowntown* (Tony Hatch)
4. New Song

== Personnel ==
- Robert “Bob” Pfeifer – vocals, guitar
- Myrna Marcarian – Farfisa organ, vocals
- Ron Metz – drums
- Dave Schramm – bass*
