= Summerspell =

- Directed by: Lina Shanklin
- Written by: Lina Shanklin
- Starring: Dorothy Holland; Jennifer Mayo; Frank Whiteman
- Cinematography: Robert Elswit
- Edited by: Gloria Whittemore
- Release date: April 1, 1983 (U.S. Film Festival)

Summerspell is an independent film written and directed by Lina Shanklin. It premiered at the U.S. Film Festival (the precursor to Sundance) on April 1, 1983.

== Plot ==
The film follows the members of a large extended family as they gather on the Fourth of July for a not-so-happy reunion on their West Texas ranch right after World War II.

== Reception ==
"Shanklin has etched a family saga in the tradition of O'Neill, Tennessee Williams, and early William Faulkner. Strikingly lensed and directed with a firm hand, SUMMERSPELL marks the debut of a talented Yank director with an unusually refined eye." wrote Variety magazine.

"The adult awakening of a young girl, a long-kept secret that refuses to stay buried, a reunion of the family that must not admit to the truth collide in this story of a family coming apart. The film boasts strong direction by Lina Shanklin (One Of Those Nights), breathtaking photography by Robert Elswit (Let There Be Blood, Boogie Nights, The River Wild, Tomorrow Never Dies) and matchless performances from an ensemble cast."—JFK Center for the Performing Arts

== Cast ==
Dorothy Holland as Bernice Wisdom

Jennifer Mayo as Eleanor Wisdom

Frank Whiteman as Lowell Wisdom

Michael Holmes as Uncle Ezra

Joan Crosby as Aunt Maggie

Kay Freedman as Aunt Lillian - Gay Hagen as Aunt Edna Mae

Ed Wright as Grandfather Wisdom

Coleman Creel as Cecil

Bert Tanswell as Rich

== Production ==
Shanklin based the script off her experiences growing up in the American Southwest. She said it took her nearly four years to get the film made.
