= Bam Bam and Celeste =

2005 film directed by Lorene Machado

- Film poster
- Directed by: Lorene Machado
- Written by: Margaret Cho
- Starring: Margaret Cho; Bruce Daniels; Alan Cumming; Jane Lynch; Wilson Cruz
- Music by: Pat Irwin
- Release date: September 2005 (Toronto International Film Festival)
- Running time: 84 minutes
- Country: United States
- Language: English

Bam Bam and Celeste is a 2005 comedy film starring Margaret Cho and Bruce Daniels.

== Plot ==
Two friends, Bam Bam and Celeste, embark on a cross country road trip to try their luck on a New York City reality television show.

== Cast ==
- Margaret Cho as Celeste / Mommy
- Wayne Federman as Redneck
- Elaine Hendrix as Jackie
- Butch Klein as Ryan
- Katy Selverstone as Allegra
- Bruce Daniels as Bam Bam
- Sabrina Matthews as Suburban Dyke
- John Cho as Stephan
- Kali Rocha as Angela
- Kathy Najimy as Legba
- Jackie Kashian as Eileen
- Nisha Ganatra as Linda
- Alan Cumming as Eugene
- Michael J. McKenna as Giant
- Ryan Landry as Clem
- Jane Lynch as Darlene
- Danny Hoch as Neo Nazi
- Wilson Cruz as Tony
- Chris Williams as Malik
- Jackie Beat as Shandra
- Molly Bryant as Waitress
- Mark Vasconcellos as Stage Manager
