= Sax Maniac =

Studio album by James White and the Blacks
- Released: 1982
- Studios: Blank Tapes, New York
- Length: 44:04
- Label: Animal
- Producer: James White

James White and the Blacks chronology
Off White (1979)	Sax Maniac (1982)	Melt Yourself Down (1986)

Sax Maniac is a 1982 album by the New York jazz band James White and the Blacks. The album was released on Chris Stein's Animal Records label and dedicated to band manager, collaborator, and girlfriend of frontman James Chance, Anya Phillips.

== Critical reception ==
Professional ratings
Review scores
Source	Rating
AllMusic	2.5/5 stars
Sounds	5/5 stars

The Globe and Mail wrote that, "although there are no great departures here, the music has lost some of its wise-guy stance and is beginning to move into more emotional territory." The New York Times opined that, "while the music on Sax Maniac is as deliberately tacky and mordantly funny as ever, it also evidences considerable growth... Mr. White's horn arrangements are much more sophisticated and inventive, especially on his demolition derby deconstruction of Arlen and Mercer's 'That Old Black Magic' and the woefully perverse 'Disco Jaded'."

== Track listing ==
All tracks composed by James White, except where indicated

1. "Irresistible Impulse"
2. "That Old Black Magic" (Harold Arlen, Johnny Mercer)
3. "Disco Jaded"
4. "Money to Burn"
5. "Sax Maniac"
6. "Sax Machine"
7. "The Twitch"

== Personnel ==
Jame White and the Blacks

- James White - lead vocals, alto saxophone, piano on "Irresistible Impulse" and "Disco Jaded"
- Chris Cunningham, Jerry Antonius - guitar
- The Discolitas (Bemshi Jones and Cherie Donovan) - backing and lead vocals
- Colin Wade - bass
- Ralph Rolle - drums, percussion

Guests

- Luther Thomas - saxophone
- Robert Aaron - tenor saxophone, piano on "That Old Black Magic"
- Joseph Bowie - trombone on "Irresistible Impulse", "Sax Machine" and "Sax Maniac"
- John Mulkerin - trumpet on "Irresistible Impulse", "Sax Machine" and "Sax Maniac"
- Jack Walrath - trumpet on "That Old Black Magic"
- Ray Maldonado - trumpet on "Money to Burn" and "The Twitch"
