= All Summer in a Day =

1954 short story by Ray Bradbury

- Short story by Ray Bradbury
- Country: United States
- Language: English
- Genre: Science fiction

Publication
- Published in: The Magazine of Fantasy & Science Fiction
- Media type: Short story
- Publication date: March 1954
- Pages: 8

"All Summer in a Day" is a science fiction short story written by American writer Ray Bradbury. He first published it in March 1954 for The Magazine of Fantasy & Science Fiction.

== Plot ==
The story is about a class of nine-year-old students on Venus. In the story, Venus is a world of constant rainstorms and the sun is visible for only an hour every seven years.

One of the children, Margot, moved to Venus from Earth five years earlier and is the only one who remembers the sun, since it shines regularly on Earth. She tells the other children the sun is like a "penny" or "fire in the stove". The other children, too young to have ever seen it themselves, do not believe her. Just before the sun comes out, a boy named William rallies the other children, because of the poem Margot wrote.

"I think the Sun is a Flower,

That blooms for just one hour."

And they lock Margot in a closet down a tunnel. Their teacher arrives to take the class outside to enjoy their hour of sunshine while Margot is banging on the door. In their astonishment and joy, they forget about Margot and gleefully rush to play outside, savoring every second of their newfound freedom.

Soon after, it begins to rain again, and the children start crying once they realize they will not see the sun again for another seven years. They run back inside as the sun disappears and a storm begins. At this point, one of them remembers Margot. They let her out of the closet, ashamed of what they have done, now that they finally understand what she had been missing.

== Adaptations ==
A 30-minute television adaptation was created, originally broadcast on the PBS children's series WonderWorks in 1982. The adaptation differs from the story in that the sun appears every nine years, and the ending is expanded: the children atone for their horrible act by giving Margot flowers they picked while the Sun was out. The director of photography was Robert Elswit, who became an Academy Award-winning cinematographer.

=== Short film cast ===
- Reesa Mallen as Margot
- Keith Coogan as William
- Jerry Marshak as Michael
- Tammy Simpson as Paula
- Bridget Meade as Lisa
- Edith Fields as Mrs. Callaghan

== See also ==
- Venus in fiction
- The Long Rain
- Atmosphere of Venus
