= Pat Irwin =

American composer and musician (born 1955)

- Born: Patrick Irwin; May 17, 1955 (age 71)
- Origin: United States
- Genres: Film score, contemporary classical music, rock
- Occupations: Composer, pianist, conductor, keyboardist, guitarist, saxophonist
- Instruments: Piano, keyboards, guitar, saxophone

Pat Irwin (born May 17, 1955) is an American composer and musician who was a founding member of two bands that grew out of New York City's no wave scene in the late 1970s, the Raybeats and 8-Eyed Spy. He joined the B-52s from 1989 through 2008. He currently performs and records with SUSS who have released several records on the indie label Northern Spy.

He composed the score for the Showtime series, Dexter: New Blood, Dexter: Original Sin, and Dexter: Resurrection. Other television scores include HBO's Bored to Death, Showtime's Nurse Jackie, and The Good Cop on Netflix. He has composed scores for many cartoons including Rocko's Modern Life, Pepper Ann, A Little Curious, and Class of 3000. Independent film credits include My New Gun, But I'm A Cheerleader, and Bam Bam and Celeste.

== Biography ==
Pat Irwin graduated from Grinnell College in 1977. He received a Thomas J. Watson Fellowship for international study and moved to Paris after graduation. In Paris he attended composition workshops with John Cage. Moving to New York City in 1979 he was a founding member of the no wave band 8-Eyed Spy which included Lydia Lunch and Jim Sclavunos, both members of Teenage Jesus and the Jerks and George Scott III from the Contortions. With Scott, he later formed the Raybeats with other former members of the Contortions: Jody Harris and Don Christensen.

8-Eyed Spy dissolved in 1980 after the death of George Scott. The band released Live on ROIR as a cassette only issue and a self-titled record on Fetish that was completed without Scott. Both Irwin and Scott contributed to Lydia Lunch's solo recording on ZE, Queen Of Siam. Scott was credited as Jack Ruby, a reference to his band before joining The Contortions.

The Raybeats continued to perform with Danny Amis on bass. They released two full-length albums, Guitar Beat, produced by Martin Rushent and recorded in 1981 at Rushent's newly built studio outside London. The Raybeats second LP, It's Only A Movie was recorded in New York City in 1983 and was produced by the band with Joe Blaney and mixed at Electric Lady Studios. In 2013 The Raybeats released The Lost Philip Glass Sessions on Orange Mountain Music, a collection of recordings that were started with Philip Glass in 1982 but were never completed.

Robert Palmer, writing in The New York Times, described Irwin as a "mercurial presence on the New York rock scene of the early 80's. The bands he helped found, the Raybeats and 8-Eyed Spy resembled each other only in that they had an aversion to the predictable and the ordinary." He began touring and recording with new wave rock band the B-52's in 1989, playing keyboards and guitar. His relationship with the band began when they borrowed Irwin's amplifier for their first gig in New York City in 1978. The band toured steadily through the 1990s and had two Top-Ten hits with "Love Shack" and "Roam". Since 2018, he has been performing and recording with the ambient-country group, SUSS.

Irwin composed the score for the Showtime series, Dexter: New Blood. He also composed the scores for HBO’s Bored To Death and the Showtime series, Nurse Jackie. He composed the scores for many cartoons including Rocko’s Modern Life, Pepper Ann, A Little Curious, and the Emmy Award winning Class of 3000 (with André 3000 from the group, Outkast.) His contributions to the SpongeBob SquarePants soundtracks were given ASCAP Film and Television Music Awards in 2011, 2012, and 2013. The Cartoon Music Book referred to Irwin’s music as "astonishing musical cues that hold up with the best of Raymond Scott."

Irwin has performed in various venues throughout the world including CBGB, Max's Kansas City, Mudd Club, The Kitchen, Dance Theater Workshop, The Knitting Factory, Radio City Music Hall, Carnegie Hall and Madison Square Garden.

Irwin's first feature film score was for My New Gun which was shown at the Cannes Film Festival in 1992. He has since composed the scores for many independent films including But I’m A Cheerleader, and Bam Bam and Celeste as well as several documentaries including Fall To Grace written and directed by Alexandra Pelosi for HBO Documentaries.

In 2012 Irwin received an honorary doctorate from Grinnell College. He currently teaches a seminar in film and television music at NYU's Tisch School of the Arts Graduate Musical Theatre Writing Program, as well a seminar in Scoring for Film and Television at the Feirstein Graduate School of Cinema at Brooklyn College.

== Discography ==
- See The Raybeats Discography
- See the B-52's Discography
- See 8-Eyed Spy Discography
- 2018: SUSS - Ghost Box
- 2019: SUSS - High Line
- 2019: Pat Irwin & J. Walter Hawkes - Wide Open Sky
- 2020: SUSS - Promise
- 2021: SUSS - Night Suite
- 2022: SUSS - SUSS
- 2024: SUSS - Birds & Beasts
- 2026: SUSS - Counting Sunsets

== Film ==
Year	Title	Director(s)	Notes
1987	The Day of Five Billion	Nicholas Boxer, Barbara Y.E. Pyle	Documentary
1989	Without Borders		Documentary
1990	Nauru: The Island Planet		Documentary
1992	I Talk to Animals		Documentary
1992	My New Gun	Stacy Cochran	
1995	Heading Home	Maria Heritler	
1996	Loose Women	Paul F. Bernard	
1996	Breathing Room	Jon Sherman	
1996	Sudden Manhattan	Adrienne Shelly	
1997	Colin Fitz Lives!	Robert Bella	
1997	Arresting Gena	Hannah Weyer	
1998	KaBlam!	JetCat	
1999	Suits	Eric Weber	
1999	But I'm a Cheerleader	Jamie Babbit	
2000	Drop Back Ten	Stacy Cochran	
2004	Personal Sergeant		
2005	Bam Bam and Celeste	Lorene Machado	
2008	The Accidental Advocate	Jessica Gerstle	Documentary
2011	Stags		
2012	Cherry Cottage	Dave Simonds	Documentary
2012	Pervertigo		
2012	La Muse		Short
2013	Fall to Grace	Alexandra Pelosi	Documentary
2019	Rocko's Modern Life: Static Cling	Joe Murray, Cosmo Segurson	TV Special

== Television ==
Year	Title	Notes
1987–1988	Tales from the Darkside	
1992	Nova	Episode: An Astronauts View of Earth
1993–1996	Rocko's Modern Life	
1997	Bear in the Big Blue House	Episode: Why Bears Can't Fly?
1997–2001	Pepper Ann	
1999	Paramour	
1999-2000	A Little Curious	
2002	The Groovenians	
2005–2008	My Gym Partner's a Monkey	Theme co-writer
2006–2008	Class of 3000	
2011	Bored to Death	Season 3
2013–2015	Nurse Jackie	Seasons 5–7
2021	Dexter: New Blood	
2024–2025	Dexter: Original Sin	
2025–present	Dexter: Resurrection	
