= Tess Frazer =

American actress from New York City

- Occupation: Actress
- Years active: 2013–present

Tess Frazer is an American actress from New York City. She is best known for starring alongside Michelle Dockery, Merritt Wever, and Jeff Daniels when playing Callie Dunne in the Emmy Award winning Netflix western TV miniseries Godless.

== Early life and education ==
A native New Yorker born into a family of actors, Tess has performed on stage in New York and beyond since she was a young child. Frazer is a graduate of the Fiorello H. LaGuardia High School of Music & Art and Performing Arts and trained at Maggie Flanigan Studio and Circle in the Square Theatre. She has studied and performed improv comedy at IO Theater in Chicago, Illinois, as well as The PIT, Magnet, and UCB theaters in New York City.

== Theatre ==
Tess originated the role of Lorna in the world premiere of award-winning playwright Tracy Letts's Mary Page Marlowe at the renowned Steppenwolf Theatre in Chicago. Directed by Tony Award-winning director Anna D. Shapiro, the play opened in April 2016 to rave reviews. Tess later reprised her role in the recent revival at Second Stage Theater in New York City in the summer of 2018, directed by Lila Neugebauer.

== Screen ==
Frazer made her feature debut in the 2015 television movie Fan Girl opposite Meg Ryan and Kiernan Shipka playing Claire Bovary, a social media super-star who is as popular as she is kind.

Frazer was a series regular in the 2017 Netflix western limited series Godless, playing Callie Dunne, a former prostitute turned schoolteacher, starring alongside Michelle Dockery, Merritt Weaver and Jeff Daniels. Tess also appears opposite Emily Mortimer in the romantic comedy/heist film Write When You Get Work as Ashley Spradlin, a trusted and caring school administrator.

== Filmography ==
=== TV & film ===
Year	Title	Role	notes
2015	Fan Girl	Claire	(TV Movie)
2015	The Slap	Pretty Girl	(TV Series)
2016	Café Society	Phil's Secretary	Film
2017	Godless	Callie Dunne (7 episodes)	(TV Series)
2018	Paterno	Campus Interviewee	Film
2018	Write When You Get Work (film)	Ashley Spradlin	Film
2019	What am I doing here?	Emily Jule	(TV series)
2022	FBI: Most Wanted season 4	Darlene Sherman	Series 4 episode 1 – "Iron Pipeline"

== Theater ==
Year	Production	Role	Theatre / Company / reference
2018	Mary Page Marlowe by Tracy Letts	Lorna	Off-Broadway / Second Stage Theater
2019	The Poor of New York by Dion Boucicault	?	Metropolitan Playhouse
