= Coffee Break! =

Live album by Human Switchboard
- Released: 1982
- Recorded: November 8, 1981
- Genre: New wave
- Label: ROIR

Human Switchboard chronology
Who's Landing in My Hangar? (1981)	Coffee Break! (1982)

Professional ratings
Review scores
Source	Rating
Allmusic	3/5 stars

Coffee Break! was the last album by Human Switchboard. It was recorded live at the Agora Ballroom in Cleveland on November 8, 1981 and was broadcast on radio station WMMS. It was issued on both cassette tape and LP.

== Track listing ==
All songs written by Bob Pfeifer, except where noted.

=== Side one ===
1. "Who's Landing in My Hangar?"
2. "I Can Walk Alone" – (Bob Pfeifer / Myrna Marcarian)
3. "Sharpest Girl"
4. "In This Town"
5. "Why Why"
6. "No Heart"

=== Side two ===
1. "Maybe (Somebody Wanted to Help)"
2. "It's Not Fair"
3. "She Invites"
4. "Where the Light Breaks"
5. "Book on Looks"

== Personnel ==
- Robert “Bob” Pfeifer - vocals, guitar
- Myrna Marcarian - Farfisa organ, vocals
- Ron Metz - drums
- Steve Calabaria - bass

== Reception ==
Writing in The Boston Phoenix, Joyce Millman said of the release that "it’s marred by lousy sound quality and the inane comments of DJ Scott Anderson. The performance isn’t great either."
