= James Chance and the Contortions =

American band

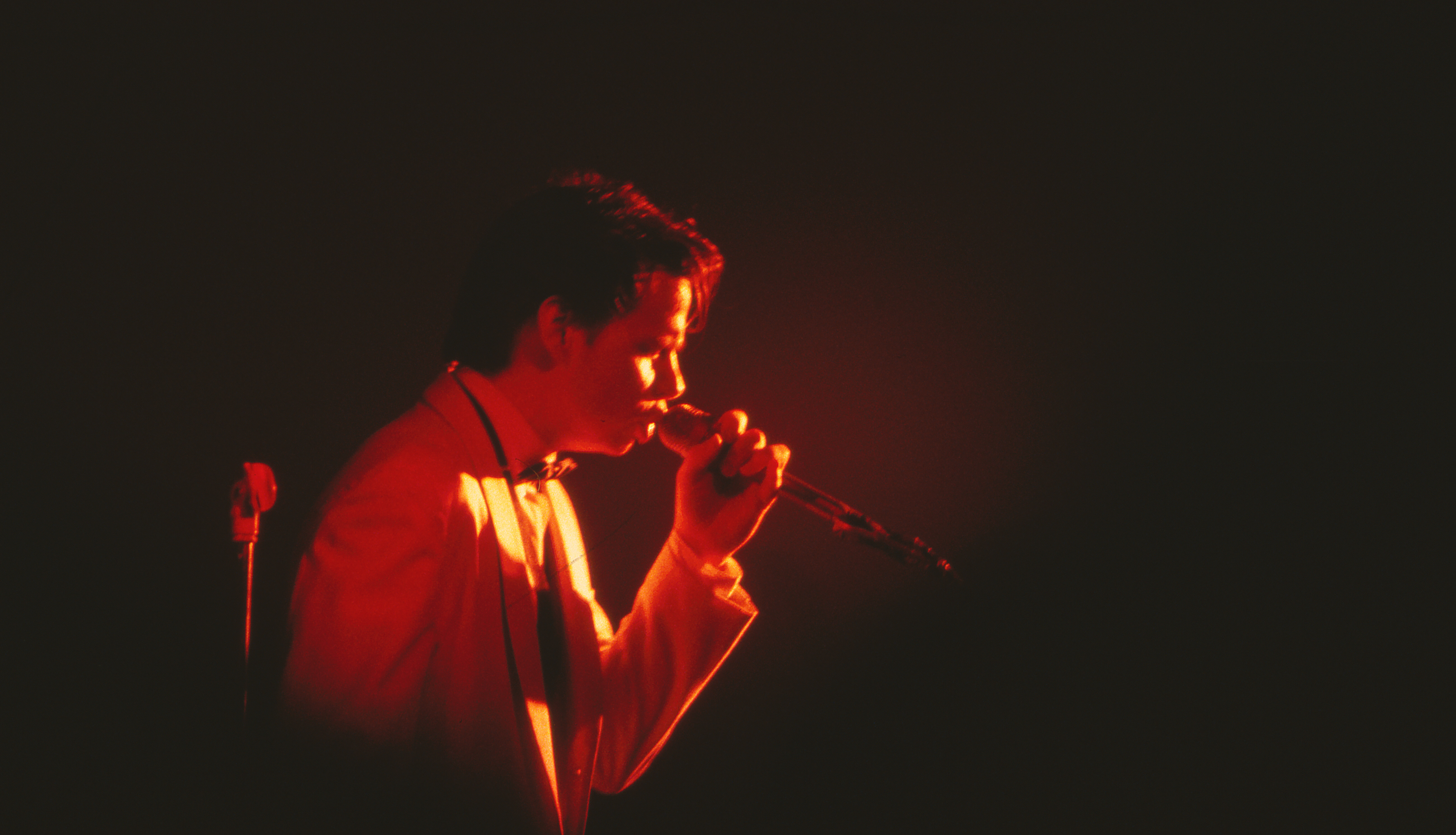
- James Chance in Berlin, 1981

Background information
- Also known as: Contortions
- Origin: New York City, U.S.
- Genres: No wave; avant-funk; punk jazz; dance-punk
- Years active: 1977–2016
- Label: ZE
- Past members: James Chance; George Scott III; Adele Bertei; Jody Harris; Pat Place; Patrick Geoffrois; Richie Harrison; Chiko Hige; Don Christensen; Fred Wells; Lorenzo "Tony" Wyche; Steven Kramer; James Nares

James Chance and the Contortions (initially known simply as Contortions, a spin-off group is called James White and the Blacks) was a musical group led by saxophonist and vocalist James Chance, formed in 1977. They were a central act of New York City's downtown no wave music scene in the late 1970s, and were featured on the influential compilation No New York (1978).

== Recording history ==
Their first recording, credited solely as Contortions, was on the 1978 compilation, No New York, produced by Brian Eno. The following year, two albums were issued almost simultaneously on ZE Records; Buy and Off White under the moniker James White and the Blacks. The same musicians recorded both records, though none are credited on the album covers. The Contortions appeared in Rosa von Praunheim's film Das Todesmagazin in 1979.

In 2016, Chance released his first single with his original Contortions band in nearly 30 years, titled "Melt Yourself Down". A music video for the single was directed, filmed and animated by 19 year old Dylan Greenberg and is considered the first Contortions music video to make significant use of dramatic digital effects, such as Chance's face being manipulated to appear as if it were melting.

== Band members ==
Original Contortions guitarist Pat Place went on to found the group Bush Tetras. Bass player George Scott played with Lydia Lunch and Michael Paumgarten in 8-Eyed Spy. Shortly thereafter, guitarist Jody Harris formed Raybeats with Don Christensen, George Scott III and Pat Irwin. Keyboardist Adele Bertei formed the Bloods, after which she released a solo record, Little Lives, in 1988. In 1979 George Scott toured with John Cale, as documented on the album Sabotage Live. Scott died of a heroin overdose on August 5, 1980. Steven Kramer played organ and percussion in the second incarnation of the Contortions in 1979–80, and later led the Twin Cities MN funk/polka band The Wallets. Some of the members of James White and the Blacks, notably Joseph Bowie, separated from Chance and formed the band Defunkt.

On November 30, 2010, James Chance, Pat Place, Don Christensen, Jody Harris, Adele Bertei, and Robert Aaron reunited as James Chance and the Contortions at Le Poisson Rouge for a single performance. Robert Aaron was not an original member but frequently collaborated with Chance.

James Chance died on June 18, 2024 at the age of 71.

== Legacy ==
The Contortions were featured in 2023 at the Centre Pompidou in a Nicolas Ballet curated no wave exhibition titled Who You Staring At: Culture Visuelle de la Scène No Wave des Années 1970 et 1980 (Visual Culture of the No Wave Scene in the 1970s and 1980s).

== Discography ==
- No New York (1978) (compilation contribution, as Contortions)
- Buy (1979) (as Contortions)
- Live aux Bains Douches (1980)
- Live in New York (1981)
- Soul Exorcism (1991)
- Lost Chance (1995)
- Molotov Cocktail Lounge (Enemy, 1996)
- White Cannibal (2000)
- The Flesh is Weak (2016)

== Bibliography ==
- McCormick, Carlo (2006). The Downtown Book: The New York Art Scene, 1974–1984. Princeton University Press.
- Masters, M.; Walter, W.; Young, R. (2007). No Wave. Black Dog. ISBN 978-1-906155-02-5.
