= James Chance =

American musician (1953–2024)

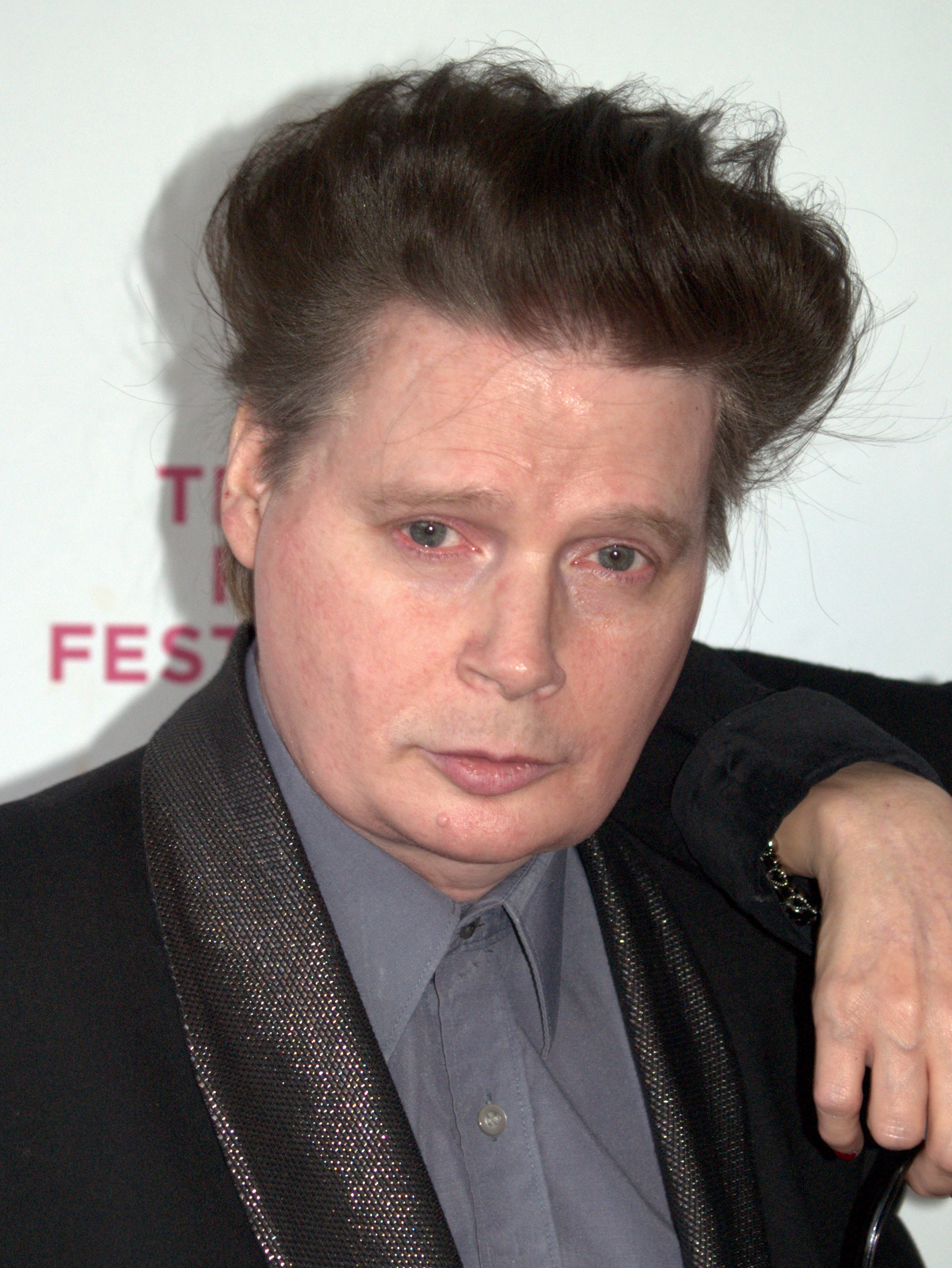
- Chance at the 2009 Tribeca Film Festival

Background information
- Also known as: James White
- Born: James Siegfried; April 20, 1953; Milwaukee, Wisconsin, U.S.
- Died: June 18, 2024 (aged 71) New York City, U.S.
- Genres: No wave, avant-funk, punk jazz, dance-punk
- Occupations: Musician, singer, songwriter
- Instruments: Alto saxophone, keyboards, vocals
- Years active: 1976–2019
- Labels: ZE, ROIR
- Formerly of: Teenage Jesus and the Jerks, James Chance and the Contortions, James White and the Blacks

James Siegfried (April 20, 1953 – June 18, 2024; known professionally as James Chance, originally as James White) was an American saxophonist, keyboard player, and singer. A key figure in no wave, he played a combination of improvisational jazz-like music and punk in the New York music scene from the late 1970s on, in such bands as Teenage Jesus and the Jerks, James Chance and the Contortions, James White and the Blacks (as he appeared in the film Downtown 81), The Flaming Demonics, James Chance & the Sardonic Symphonics, James Chance and Terminal City, and James Chance and Les Contortions.

== Background ==
James Siegfried was born in Milwaukee in 1953, growing up there and in the suburb of Brookfield, Wisconsin. Siegfried attended Michigan State University, then the Wisconsin Conservatory of Music in Milwaukee. There, he joined a band named Death, which performed covers of the Stooges and the Velvet Underground before moving toward original songs.

== Career ==
At the end of 1975, Siegfried dropped out and moved to New York City after the dissolution of the band and the death of its singer. He quickly became active in both the free jazz and no wave punk rock scenes. His first band in New York in 1976 was an instrumental quartet with violin, drums and bass called Flaming Youth. He started Teenage Jesus and the Jerks with Lydia Lunch the same year. In 1977, after studying for a short time under David Murray, he formed The Contortions, who fused jazz improvisation and funky rhythms, with live shows often ending in violent confrontations with audience members. By this time, he had adopted the stage name James Chance. The Contortions reached a wider audience with their contribution to the Brian Eno-compiled No New York collection of No Wave acts. The band appeared in Rosa von Praunheim's film Das Todesmagazin in 1979.

While Chance shared an apartment with No Wave musical luminary Lydia Lunch, the duo created seminal No Wave group Teenage Jesus and the Jerks, which Chance soon left.

Chance was noted for engaging in physical confrontations, from forcing the audience out of their seats and getting in fist fights with his New York City audience, including rock critic Robert Christgau. At first, this was just an attempt to engage the passive New York audience, but this practice is reported to have somewhat diminished after audiences came to expect the physical confrontations. He discussed issues of race and working with black musicians in a number of interviews.

In 1979, Chance collaborated with Arto Lindsay, Bradley Field, and George Scott on the soundtrack to Diego Cortez's film Grutzi Elvis.

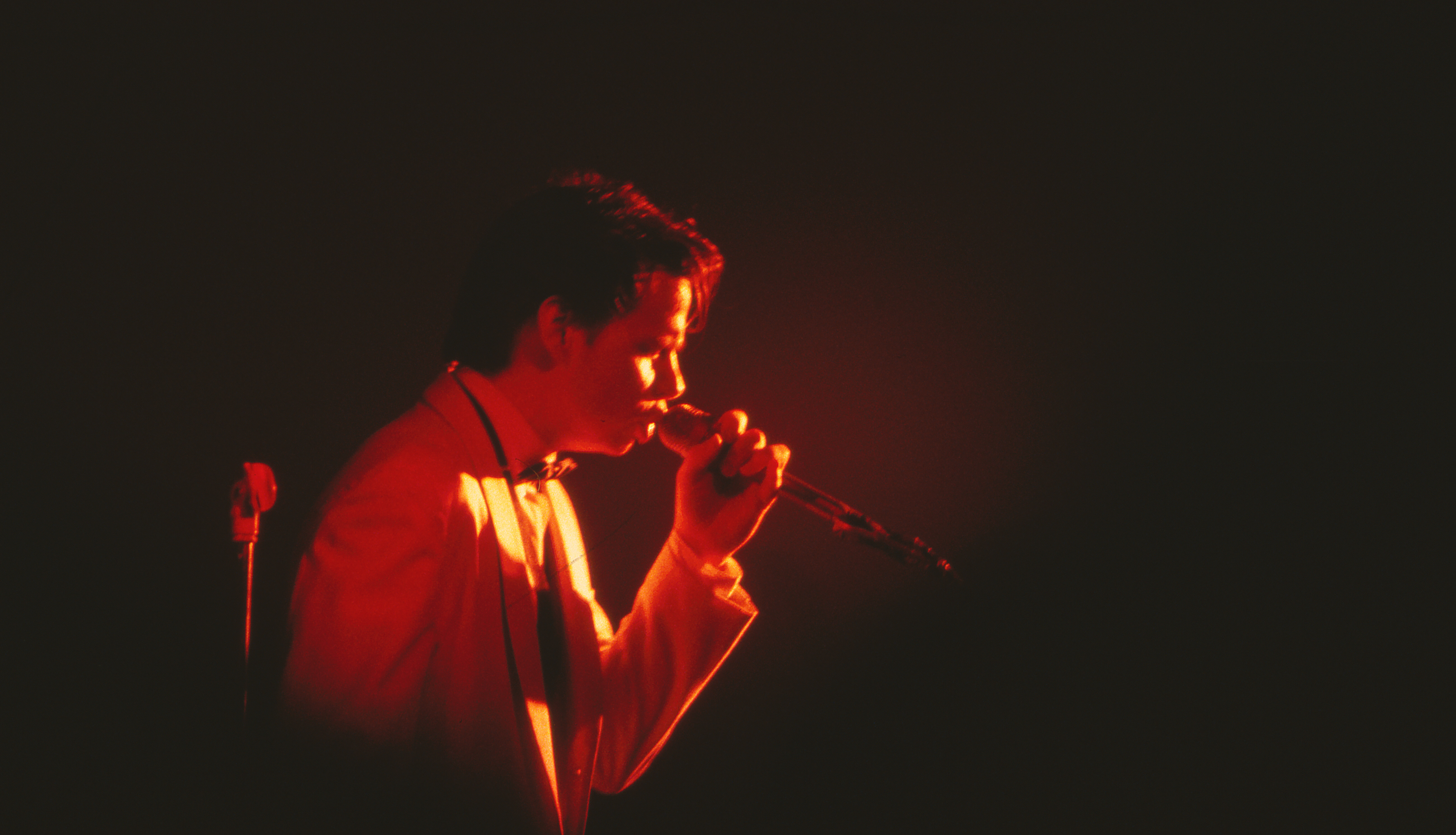
James Chance in 1981

Chance's stage and musical persona were finalized by romantic partner and agent Anya Phillips, who died of cancer in 1981. Frictions between Chance and band members eventually led to a breakup of the Contortions in the fall of 1979. The Contortions released one album, Buy in late 1979, and another album, Off White, under the pseudonym James White and the Blacks in 1980 (featuring Lydia Lunch under the pseudonym Stella Rico). Chance re-formed James White and the Blacks with a completely different lineup that appeared on the 1982 album Sax Maniac which was dedicated to Phillips. The group released one more album, Melt Yourself Down, a very limited Japanese release.

The first version of the Blacks was set up by Joseph Bowie. Shortly after, Defunkt emerged from the Blacks. In 1982 Chance toured with the re-formed James White and the Blacks with his brother David "Tremor" Siegfried and his band David and the Happenings from Carbondale, Illinois, playing Chicago, their hometown Milwaukee, and much of the Midwest.

Chance briefly relocated to Paris, returning to New York City in 1983 to record the album James White Presents The Flaming Demonics.

In 1987, he contributed saxophone to The False Prophets' Implosion album.

In 2001, Chance reunited with original Contortions members Jody Harris (guitar), Pat Place (slide guitar), and Don Christensen (drums) for a few limited engagements. Original keyboard player Adele Bertei appeared briefly, but bass player George Scott III had died of an accidental drug overdose in 1980 and his slot was filled by Erik Sanko. The reunited group played twice at the All Tomorrow's Parties music festival, and, in 2008, at the PS1 Warm Up series. Chance also recorded with Blondie after coming out of semi-retirement. Tiger Style records released the 4-CD box set retrospective Irresistible Impulse to critical acclaim in 2003. A live-DVD James Chance – Chance of a Lifetime: Live in Chicago 2003 was released in 2005.

In addition to limited engagements with the original Contortions, Chance occasionally performed and recorded with the Chicago band Watchers. In Europe, he performed with James Chance & Les Contortions, French musicians who had been his backing band since 2006. They played a 15-show Europe tour in April and May 2007 and were back in Europe in October 2007. In May 2012 they released the CD Incorrigible! on the French label LADTK, comprising seven Chance originals and two covers, all of them brand new recordings.

In 2009 Chance made occasional appearances playing keyboards in NYC with a trio, with the material restricted to close readings of jazz standards. In June 2012, Chance played in Portland, Oregon with local group Ancient Heat as his backing band. They played a number of songs from various points in his career, including a new cover of Gil Scott-Heron's "Home is Where The Hatred Is."

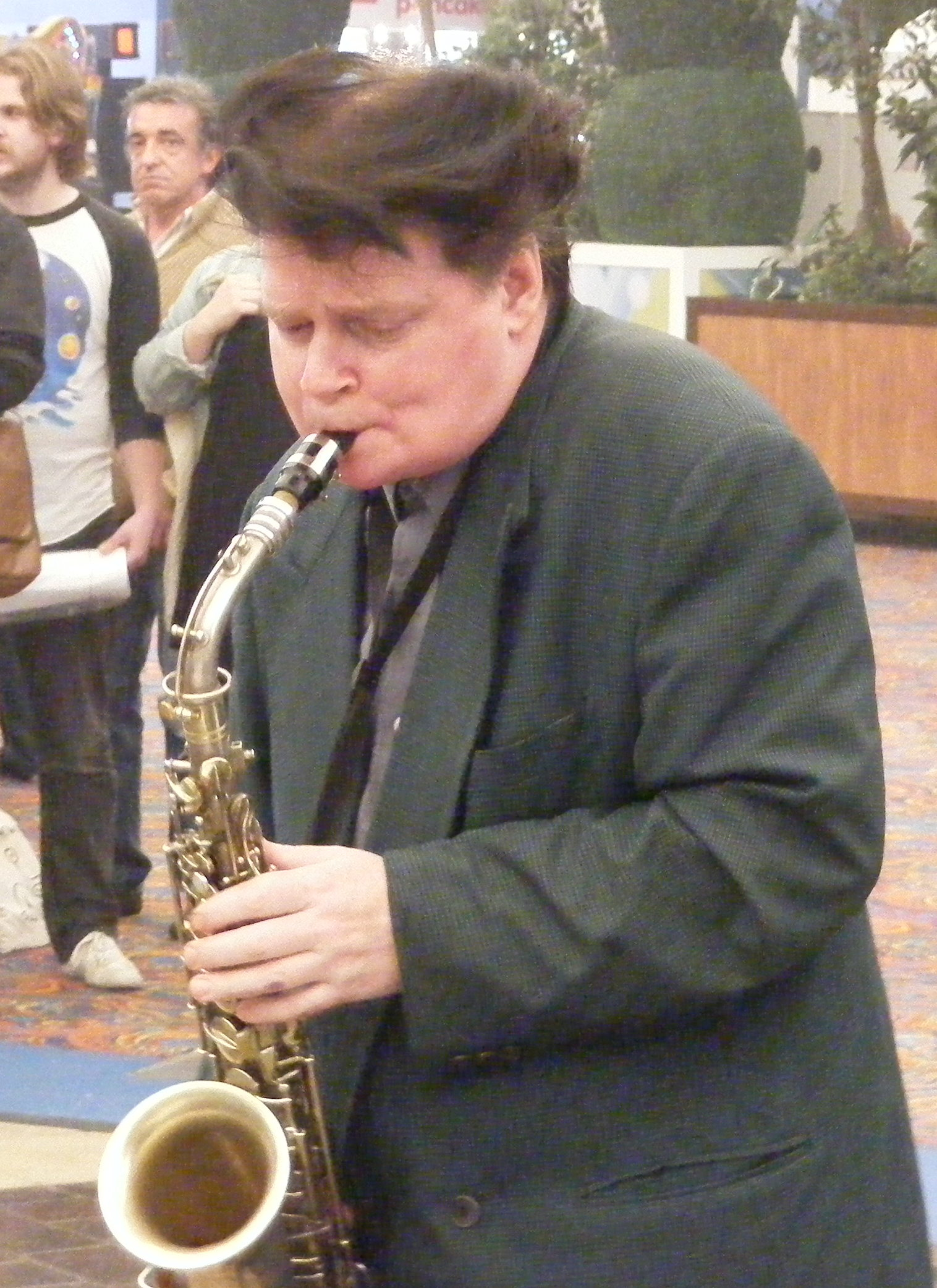
Chance performing in 2010

In 2016, 19-year-old Dylan Greenberg directed James Chance in the music video for a re-recorded version of Melt Yourself Down, his first music video in nearly 20 years. The video premiered on MOJO. He gave his final performance in 2019.

== Death ==
Chance was in poor health in the final years of his life, and he died from a gastrointestinal disease at a nursing home in East Harlem on June 18, 2024, at the age of 71.

== Discography ==
=== Albums ===
James Chance and the Contortions

- Buy (ZE Records, 1979) (as Contortions)
- Live aux Bains Douches (Invisible, France 1980)
- Live in New York (ROIR cassette, 1981)
- Soul Exorcism (ROIR cassette, 1991)
- Lost Chance (ROIR 1995, recorded 1981)
- Molotov Cocktail Lounge (Enemy Records, 1996)
- Incorrigible! (LADTK, France 2012) (as James Chance et les Contortions)
- The Flesh Is Weak (True Groove, 2016)

James White and the Blacks

- Off White (ZE Records, 1979)
- Sax Maniac (Animal, 1982)
- Melt Yourself Down (Selfish Records, Japan 1986)

James Chance and Pill Factory

- Theme from Grutzi Elvis (EP) (ZE 1979)

James White's Flaming Demonics

- James White's Flaming Demonics (ZE 1983)

James Chance and Terminal City

- The Fix Is In (decade 01 / Interbang Records IBR005 2010)

Solo

- James Chance – Chance of a Lifetime: Live in Chicago 2003 (RUNT 2005)

=== Appears On ===
- No New York (compilation, 1978) (with The Contortions)
- Teenage Jesus and the Jerks: Pre Teenage Jesus and the Jerks (EP ZE 1978) (prehistory of the band)
- Downtown 81 (soundtrack, 1981)
- Debbie Harry: Rockbird (album, 1986)
- Medium Cool (compilation, 1991), Chet Baker tribute with Alex Chilton, Adele Bertei, and Angel Torsen
- Somewhere in the City (1998)
- Blondie: No Exit (album, 1999) guest artist on alto saxophone
- Red Hot Chili Peppers Jukebox Track "Contort Yourself" (compilation, Mojo Magazine, 2004)
- TV Party (2005)
- Watchers: Rabble (guest artist) (album, 2006)
- Watchers: Vampire Driver (guest artist) (album, 2006)
- Acoustic Ladyland – Skinny Grin (album, 2006)
- Kirin J. Callinan – Bravado (album, 2017)

== See also ==
- Mudd Club
- Tier 3
- Just Another Asshole
- No wave music
- No Wave Cinema

== Sources ==
- Masters, Marc. No Wave. London: Black Dog Publishing, 2007. ISBN 978-1-906155-02-5
- Moore, Alan W., and Marc Miller (eds.). ABC No Rio Dinero: The Story of a Lower East Side Art Gallery. New York: Collaborative Projects, 1985
- Pearlman, Alison, Unpackaging Art of the 1980s. Chicago: University Of Chicago Press, 2003.
- Reynolds, Simon. "Contort Yourself: No Wave New York." In Rip It Up and Start Again: Post-punk 1978–84. London: Faber and Faber, Ltd., 2005.
- Reynolds, Simon. Totally Wired: Post-Punk Interviews and Overviews. London: Faber and Faber, 2009. ISBN 978-0-571-23549-0
- Taylor, Marvin J. (ed.). The Downtown Book: The New York Art Scene, 1974–1984, foreword by Lynn Gumpert. Princeton: Princeton University Press, 2006. ISBN 0-691-12286-5
