= Raybeats =

The Raybeats
- Origin: New York City, USA
- Genres: surf rock, no wave
- Years active: 1979–1984
- Labels: Don't Fall Off the Mountain; PVC/Passport; Shanachie Records
- Past members: Jody Harris; Pat Irwin; Don Christensen; Danny Amis; George Scott III

The Raybeats were an American instrumental neo-surf rock combo from New York City that arose from the No Wave musical scene. The original line-up consisted of Don Christensen (drums), Jody Harris (guitar), Pat Irwin (guitar, saxophone, Acetone organ), and George Scott III (bass).

== History ==
The Raybeats formed in 1979, brought together by George Scott. He had worked with Jody Harris and Don Christensen in James Chance and the Contortions, and he had worked with Pat Irwin in 8-Eyed Spy. When Scott died from a drug overdose in August 1980, he was replaced by Danny Amis. Amis left in the spring of 1982, after which the Raybeats used several bassists-for-hire, including David Hofstra, Bobby Albertson and Gene Holder. Amis later formed Los Straitjackets.

With Amis, the Raybeats recorded an EP called Roping Wild Bears, which was released in 1981. Later that year, they recorded and released a full-length album titled Guitar Beat produced by Martin Rushent. It featured ten original tunes, plus a cover of Jan Berry's "B-Gas Rickshaw." After Amis's departure in 1982, the Raybeats recorded one more album, It's Only A Movie!, which was released on Shanachie Records in 1983. They disbanded in 1984.

In 1990, Christensen, Harris and Irwin reunited one more time, playing a benefit concert for the Brooklyn Academy of Music. Jared Nickerson played bass.

On August 21, 2010 Pat Irwin, Jody Harris, Don Christensen, with Gail Ann Dorsey on bass backed up Adele Bertei (Contortions/The Bloods) at Joe's Pub in Greenwich Village. They played another show on August 25, 2010 at Bowery Electric (327 Bowery at 2nd Street). Also on the bill was Faith as well as Command V which was a band consisting of Pat Irwin, Cynthia Sley (Bush Tetras) and filmmaker Rachel Dengiz. On June 29, 2011, the Raybeats headlined a benefit concert at Maxwell's in Hoboken, New Jersey, raising funds to cover medical expenses for former bassist Danny Amis, who had been diagnosed with multiple myeloma. Steve Almaas, formerly of The Suicide Commandos and Beat Rodeo, filled in on bass.

== Discography ==
- Roping Wild Bears EP (Don't Fall Off the Mountain \ Beggars Banquet 1981)
- Guitar Beat (Don't Fall Off the Mountain [UK] \ PVC/Passport Records [US] 1981)
- It's Only A Movie! (Shanachie 1983)
- The Lost Philip Glass Sessions (Orange Mountain Music 2013)

=== Compilations ===
- Start Swimming (Stiff Records 1981) (recorded live at the Rainbow (London) on 20 Feb 1981)
- Children of Nuggets: Original Artyfacts from the Second Psychedelic Era, 1976-1995 (Rhino 2005)
