= Pat Place =

American artist, photographer and musician

Pat Place (born 1953) is an American artist, photographer, and musician noted for her work as a founding member and guitarist of no wave bands James Chance and the Contortions and Bush Tetras.

== Art ==
Place grew up in Chicago. She studied art in college, graduating with a BFA in painting and sculpture, attending Northern Illinois University and Skidmore College. She came to New York City in 1975 to pursue a career as a visual artist.

Place’s photography work was displayed in 2008 at the No Wave, Post Punk, Underground New York 1976-80 exhibition curated by Thurston Moore and Byron Coley at KS Art, and at the group exhibition Happy Vacation at Thrust Projects, both in New York City.

She was also involved in the no wave cinema scene, appearing in some of Vivienne Dick's movies, co-starring with Lydia Lunch and other musicians from New York's late 1970s and early 1980s post-punk community.

== Music ==
Place was the original guitarist and one of the founding members of the Contortions, one of the central bands in the New York no wave music scene.

She then formed the Bush Tetras. Place and vocalist Cynthia Sley produced the most distinctive aspects of the Tetras sound. Place's guitar lines were rhythmic and distortion-filled.

From the 1990s until present, Place has been performing with Bush Tetras and various noise music bands in New York City and Europe.

She participated in Maggie Estep's song and video for Hey Baby, from her 1994 album No More Mister Nice Girl.
