= George Scott III =

American bassist

- Born: George Leonard Scott III; October 16, 1953; Burlington, Iowa, U.S.
- Died: August 5, 1980 (aged 26) New York City, New York, U.S.
- Genres: No wave; new wave; punk rock
- Occupation: Musician
- Instrument: Bass

George Scott III (October 16, 1953 - August 5, 1980) was a bass player for several New York City bands during the no wave era. He was a founding member of Jack Ruby, 8-Eyed Spy and the Raybeats, and he worked with James Chance and the Contortions, James White and the Blacks, Human Switchboard, and John Cale, among others.

== Biography ==
George Leonard Scott III was born in Burlington, Iowa on October 16, 1953. He moved to Sarasota, Florida when he was a teenager, and attended high school there. One of his classmates was Paul Reubens, better known as Pee Wee Herman. Scott was interested in film and stage work at this point, and he was planning to pursue a career of some type in film.

Scott moved to New York City around 1975. Shortly after getting there, he took an interest in the burgeoning punk music scene with bands such as Television and the Patti Smith Group. He eventually bought a bass guitar and joined Boris Policeband and Randy Cohen in an early no wave band called Jack Ruby, named after the man who assassinated Lee Harvey Oswald. Jack Ruby intrigued other musicians in their scene and recorded demo tapes, including for Epic Records, that later influenced Thurston Moore of Sonic Youth. Decades later, the band was brought to the attention of the musical mainstream, and an album was issued after Scott's early roommate Gary Reese persisted in urging Scott's brother to unearth numerous tapes from the collection Scott had left in his family's possession.

While trying to make a go of it in music, Scott supported himself by working in record stores, including Bleecker Bob's and the Musical Maze on 23rd Street and 3rd Avenue, where he worked alongside Peter Holsapple of the dB's and Jimi Quidd of The Dots, who also produced the Bad Brains's debut 45. After Jack Ruby dissolved around late 1977, Scott joined the Contortions, a band led by James Chance, formerly with Teenage Jesus and the Jerks. He played bass on the four tracks the Contortions had on the No New York album, produced by Brian Eno, 1978. He recorded for the album Buy, released by ZE Records in 1979, but James Chance erased his bass lines before it was released. The same year, he appeared on a No Wave "disco" album by James White and the Blacks, which was essentially the Contortions with a new name and sound. It was while working with James Chance that Scott met Jody Harris and Don Christensen, who later joined him in the Raybeats.

After leaving James Chance in early 1979, Scott worked with John Cale, formerly of the Velvet Underground, playing several live gigs with him that developed into Cale's Sabotage/Live album, released in 1979. It was around this time that Scott teamed with Lydia Lunch, who had worked with Chance in Teenage Jesus to form 8-Eyed Spy, a fairly popular No Wave band that consisted of Pat Irwin, Michael Paumgarden and Jim Sclavunos.

While 8-Eyed Spy was starting to garner some attention, Scott formed an instrumental band. He teamed with former Contortions Harris and Christensen and fellow 8-Eyed Spy member Pat Irwin to form the Raybeats in Fall 1979. Over the next year, the band built a following by playing several places in the New York area.

== Death ==
On August 5, 1980, George Scott died from an overdose of heroin. It was a drug he had first experimented with about three years earlier when he was a member of Jack Ruby. Following Scott's death, 8-Eyed Spy ended. The Raybeats, however, continued, recruiting Danny Amis (who would later co-found Los Straitjackets) on bass.

George Scott was buried in his hometown of Burlington, Iowa.
