= Terrence Rafferty =

American film critic

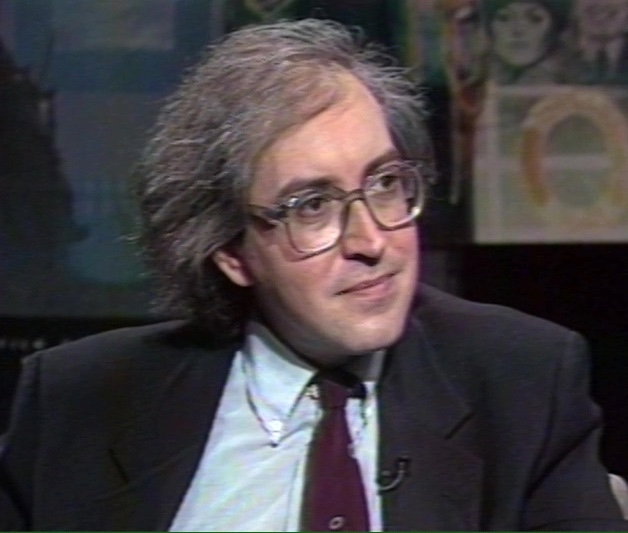
- Rafferty on CUNY TV's Cinema Then, Cinema Now (1991)
- Born: United States
- Occupations: Film critic, writer

Terrence Rafferty is a film critic who wrote regularly for The New Yorker during the 1990s. His writing has also appeared in Slate, The Atlantic Monthly, The Village Voice, The Nation, and The New York Times. For a number of years he served as critic at large for GQ. He has a particular penchant for horror fiction and has reviewed collections by Richard Matheson, Joe Hill, and the Spanish author Cristina Fernández Cubas.

== Bibliography ==
=== Books ===
- Unnatural Acts (1992)
- The Thing Happens: Ten Years of Writing About the Movies (1993)
- Elmore Leonard: Westerns (2018, editor)

=== Essays and reporting ===
- Rafferty, Terrence (September 6, 2021). "Feast and famine". The Critics. The Current Cinema. September 23, 1996. The New Yorker. 97 (27): 78–79. (Note: Online version is titled "The lovable idealism of 'Big Night'". Originally published in the September 23, 1996 issue.) Reviews Campbell Scott and Stanley Tucci's Big Night (1998).

———————
