= The Golden Palominos discography =

- Studio albums: 10
- Compilation albums: 9
- Singles: 7

The discography of experimental ensemble The Golden Palominos, fronted by drummer Anton Fier.

== Studio albums ==
| Title | Album details |
|---|---|
| The Golden Palominos | Released: 1983; Label: Celluloid; Formats: CD, LP |
| Visions of Excess | Released: 1985; Label: Celluloid; Formats: CD, CS, LP |
| Blast of Silence (Axed My Baby for a Nickel) | Released: 1986; Label: Celluloid; Formats: CD, CS, LP |
| A Dead Horse | Released: 1989; Label: Celluloid; Formats: CD, CS, LP |
| Drunk with Passion | Released: September 17, 1991 (US); Label: Restless; Formats: CD, CS, LP |
| This Is How It Feels | Released: September 28, 1993 (US); Label: Restless; Formats: CD |
| Pure | Released: October 11, 1994 (US); Label: Restless; Formats: CD |
| Dead Inside | Released: October 8, 1996 (US); Label: Restless; Formats: CD |
| A Good Country Mile | With Kevn Kinney; Released: February 21, 2012 (US); Formats: CD |

=== As Blind Light ===
| Title | Album details |
|---|---|
| The Absence of Time | Released: 1994 (JP); Label: Alda; Formats: CD |

== Singles ==
| Title | Year | US Alt. | Album |
|---|---|---|---|
| "Boy (Go)" | 1985 | — | Visions of Excess |
| "Omaha" | 1985 | — | Visions of Excess |
| "The Animal Speaks" | 1986 | — | Visions of Excess |
| "Brides of Jesus" | 1986 | — | Blast of Silence |
| "Alive and Living Now" | 1991 | 14 | Drunk with Passion |
| "A Divine Kiss" | 1993 | — | This Is How It Feels |
| "No Skin" | 1995 | — | Pure |
"—" denotes a recording that did not chart or was not released in that territory.

== Compilation albums ==
| Title | Album details |
|---|---|
| Thundering Herd: The Best of The Golden Palominos | Released: January 22, 1991 (US); Label: Oceana; Formats: CD |
| A History (1982-1985) | Released: July 21, 1992 (US); Label: Metrotone, Restless; Formats: CD |
| A History (1986-1989) | Released: July 21, 1992 (US); Label: Metrotone, Restless; Formats: CD |
| The Best of The Golden Palominos | Released: July 1, 1997 (DE); Label: Charly; Formats: CD |
| The Best of The Golden Palominos 1983-1989 | Released: 1997 (UK); Label: Music Club; Formats: CD |
| Surrealistic Surfer | Released: January 30, 2000 (UK); Label: Dressed to Kill; Formats: CD |
| Run Pony Run: An Essential Collection | Released: June 4, 2002 (US); Label: Fuel 2000; Formats: CD |
| The Golden Palominos | Released: 2005 (UK); Label: Golden Stars; Formats: CD |
| The Celluloid Collection | Released: March 20, 2006 (DE); Label: ATOM; Formats: CD |
