= Thundering Herd: The Best of The Golden Palominos =

Album by The Golden Palominos

Thundering Herd: The Best of the Golden Palominos

Greatest hits album by The Golden Palominos
- Released: January 22, 1991
- Recorded: 1983–1989
- Genre: Alternative rock
- Label: Oceana
- Producer: Anton Fier

The Golden Palominos chronology
A Dead Horse (1989)	Thundering Herd: The Best of the Golden Palominos (1991)	Drunk with Passion (1991)

Professional ratings
Review scores
Source	Rating
Allmusic	4.5/5 stars

Thundering Herd: The Best of the Golden Palominos is a compilation album by The Golden Palominos, released in 1991 by Oceana Records. It contains two tracks from the band's debut album, The Golden Palominos, plus the entirety of the albums Visions of Excess, Blast of Silence, and A Dead Horse.

== Track listing ==
Disc one
No.	Title	Writer(s)	Original album	Length
1.	"[untitled]"			0:09
2.	"Custering Train"	Anton Fier, Jody Harris, Michael Stipe	Visions of Excess	6:00
3.	"Lucky"	Robert Kidney	A Dead Horse	4:50
4.	"Angels"	Peter Blegvad, Anton Fier, Syd Straw	Blast of Silence	4:58
5.	"Diamond"	Peter Holsapple	Blast of Silence	4:30
6.	"Brides of Jesus"	Lowell George, Bill Payne	Blast of Silence	3:25
7.	"Buenos Aires"	Anton Fier, Nicky Skopelitis, Syd Straw	Visions of Excess	3:40
8.	"Under the Cap"	Anton Fier, Arto Lindsay	The Golden Palominos	5:27
9.	"Silver Bullet"	Anton Fier, Jody Harris, Syd Straw	Visions of Excess	5:00
10.	"A Letter Back"	Robert Kidney	A Dead Horse	6:55
11.	"The Push and the Shove"	Robert Kidney	Blast of Silence	4:22
12.	"Strong, Simple Silences"	Peter Blegvad, Anton Fier	Blast of Silence	4:15
13.	"Work Was New"	Peter Blegvad, Anton Fier	Blast of Silence	4:00
14.	"The Animal Speaks"	Robert Kidney	Visions of Excess	4:00
15.	"Over"	Amanda Kramer, Anton Fier, Nicky Skopelitis	A Dead Horse	7:15

Disc two
No.	Title	Writer(s)	Original album	Length
1.	"I've Been the One"	Lowell George	Blast of Silence	3:17
2.	"Boy (Go)"	Anton Fier, Jody Harris, Michael Stipe	Visions of Excess	5:15
3.	"Darklands"	Amanda Kramer, Anton Fier, Nicky Skopelitis	A Dead Horse	6:30
4.	"Something Becomes Nothing"	Peter Blegvad, Anton Fier, Matthew Sweet	Blast of Silence	4:54
5.	"Wild River"	Robert Kidney	A Dead Horse	4:30
6.	"Only One Party"	Anton Fier, Jody Harris, Arto Lindsay	Visions of Excess	4:30
7.	"Omaha"	Skip Spence	Visions of Excess	3:10
8.	"(Kind Of) True"	Anton Fier, Jody Harris, Syd Straw	Visions of Excess	4:35
9.	"Faithless Heart"	Don Dixon, Anton Fier, Jody Harris	Blast of Silence	4:00
10.	"I.D."	Anton Fier, Arto Lindsay	The Golden Palominos	6:45
11.	"Angel of Death"	Amanda Kramer, Anton Fier, Nicky Skopelitis	A Dead Horse	4:35
12.	"Shattered Image"	Amanda Kramer, Anton Fier, Nicky Skopelitis	A Dead Horse	5:15
13.	"(Something Else Is) Working Harder"	Peter Blegvad, Anton Fier, Jody Harris	Blast of Silence	5:10
14.	"[untitled]"			0:05
