= A History (1986–1989) =

Compilation album by The Golden Palominos
- Released: July 21, 1992
- Recorded: 1986–1989
- Genre: Alternative rock
- Length: 73:56
- Label: Mau Mau Records
- Producer: Anton Fier

The Golden Palominos chronology
A History (1982–1985) (1992)	A History (1986–1989) (1992)	This Is How It Feels (1993)

Professional ratings
Review scores
Source	Rating
AllMusic	3/5 stars
Entertainment Weekly	B−
Q	3/5 stars

A History (1986–1989) is a compilation album by The Golden Palominos, released on July 21, 1992, by Mau Mau Records. It contains songs from Blast of Silence (Axed My Baby for a Nickel) and A Dead Horse, excluding "Brides of Jesus" from the former and "Over" from the latter.

== Track listing ==
No.	Title	Writer(s)	Original album	Length
1.	"I've Been the One"	Lowell George	Blast of Silence	3:18
2.	"Something Becomes Nothing"	Peter Blegvad, Anton Fier, Matthew Sweet	Blast of Silence	5:08
3.	"The Push and the Shove"	Robert Kidney	Blast of Silence	4:27
4.	"(Something Else Is) Working Harder"	Peter Blegvad, Anton Fier, Jody Harris	Blast of Silence	5:19
5.	"Angels"	Peter Blegvad, Anton Fier, Syd Straw	Blast of Silence	5:01
6.	"Diamond"	Peter Holsapple	Blast of Silence	4:40
7.	"Faithless Heart"	Don Dixon, Anton Fier, Jody Harris	Blast of Silence	4:04
8.	"Work Was New"	Peter Blegvad, Anton Fier	Blast of Silence	4:08
9.	"Strong, Simple Silences"	Peter Blegvad, Anton Fier	Blast of Silence	4:19
10.	"Wild River"	Robert Kidney	A Dead Horse	4:40
11.	"Shattered Image"	Amanda Kramer, Anton Fier, Nicky Skopelitis	A Dead Horse	5:25
12.	"Angel of Death"	Amanda Kramer, Anton Fier, Nicky Skopelitis	A Dead Horse	4:43
13.	"Lucky"	Robert Kidney	A Dead Horse	4:54
14.	"Darklands"	Amanda Kramer, Anton Fier, Nicky Skopelitis	A Dead Horse	6:46
15.	"A Letter Back"	Robert Kidney	A Dead Horse	7:04
