= A History (1982–1985) =

Compilation album by The Golden Palominos
- Released: July 21, 1992
- Recorded: 1982–1985
- Genre: No wave, alternative rock
- Length: 73:09
- Label: Mau Mau Records
- Producer: Anton Fier

The Golden Palominos chronology
Drunk With Passion (1991)	A History (1982–1985) (1992)	A History (1986–1989) (1992)

Professional ratings
Review scores
Source	Rating
AllMusic	4/5 stars
Entertainment Weekly	A−
Q	3/5 stars

A History (1982–1985) is a compilation album by The Golden Palominos, released on July 21, 1992, by Mau Mau Records. It contains the band's first two albums with the exception of "Clean Plate" from The Golden Palominos.

== Track listing ==
No.	Title	Writer(s)	Original album	Length
1.	"Hot Seat"	Anton Fier, Mark E. Miller, Charles K. Noyes	The Golden Palominos	5:16
2.	"Under the Cap"	Anton Fier, Arto Lindsay	The Golden Palominos	5:35
3.	"Monday Night"	Anton Fier, Arto Lindsay	The Golden Palominos	6:31
4.	"Cookout"	Anton Fier	The Golden Palominos	4:39
5.	"I.D."	Anton Fier, Arto Lindsay	The Golden Palominos	6:47
6.	"Two Sided Fist"	Anton Fier, Fred Frith, Arto Lindsay	The Golden Palominos	7:44
7.	"Boy (Go)"	Anton Fier, Jody Harris, Michael Stipe	Visions of Excess	5:29
8.	"Clustering Train"	Anton Fier, Jody Harris, Michael Stipe	Visions of Excess	6:06
9.	"Omaha"	Skip Spence	Visions of Excess	3:12
10.	"The Animal Speaks"	Robert Kidney	Visions of Excess	4:08
11.	"Silver Bullet"	Anton Fier, Jody Harris, Syd Straw	Visions of Excess	5:11
12.	"(Kind of) True"	Anton Fier, Jody Harris, Syd Straw	Visions of Excess	4:44
13.	"Buenos Aires"	Anton Fier, Nicky Skopelitis, Syd Straw	Visions of Excess	3:47
14.	"Only One Party"	Anton Fier, Jody Harris, Arto Lindsay	Visions of Excess	4:29
