= Alive and Living Now =

Single by The Golden Palominos

from the album Drunk with Passion
- Released: 1991
- Recorded: Greenpoint Studios, Brooklyn, New York
- Genre: Alternative rock
- Length: 5:38
- Label: Virgin
- Songwriter(s): Anton Fier, Michael Stipe, Nicky Skopelitis
- Producer(s): Anton Fier

"Alive and Living Now" is a song by The Golden Palominos. Although they had released other singles in promotion of their albums, "Alive and Living Now" is their only charting song. Guest musicians include Michael Stipe of R.E.M. on vocals, British songwriter Richard Thompson on lead guitar, and jazz bandleader Carla Bley on Hammond organ.

== Reception ==
The song charted at No. 14 on U.S. Billboard Modern Rock Tracks and was subject to some critical acclaim. allmusic critic Tom Demalon described the track as "a buoyant, midtempo celebration of life" and a highlight of the album. David Browne of Entertainment Weekly went as far as to declare the track more vibrant than the entirety of the Out of Time album released the same year. Browne stated, "the song, Stipe's ode to that special someone who re-energizes you after all seems lost, virtually explodes with a kicky blast of newfound love, and it's a thrill to hear Stipe, who enunciates every confessional word, go out on such an emotional limb."

== Chart positions ==
Chart (1991)	Peak position
US Alternative Airplay (Billboard)	14

== Personnel ==
- Carla Bley – Hammond organ
- Anton Fier – drums, percussion, production
- Amanda Kramer – keyboards, backing vocals
- Bill Laswell – bass guitar
- Nicky Skopelitis – guitar, acoustic guitar
- Michael Stipe – vocals
- Richard Thompson – guitar
