= A History =

A History may refer to:

- A History (1982–1985), a compilation album by The Golden Palominos
- A History (1986–1989), a compilation album by The Golden Palominos
