= Pure (The Golden Palominos album) =

Studio album by The Golden Palominos
- Released: October 11, 1994
- Recorded: Greenpoint, Brooklyn, New York
- Genre: Dream pop, trip hop
- Length: 49:25
- Label: Restless
- Producer: Anton Fier

The Golden Palominos chronology
This Is How It Feels (1993)	Pure (1994)	Dead Inside (1996)

Professional ratings
Review scores
Source	Rating
AllMusic	4/5 stars
Q	3/5 stars

Pure is the seventh album by The Golden Palominos, released on October 11, 1994, by Restless Records.

== Track listing ==
No.	Title	Writer(s)	Length
1.	"Little Suicides"	Lori Carson, Anton Fier	4:44
2.	"Heaven"	Lori Carson, Anton Fier, Nicky Skopelitis	4:52
3.	"Anything"	Anton Fier, Lydia Kavanagh, Nicky Skopelitis	6:10
4.	"Wings"	Lori Carson, Anton Fier, Nicky Skopelitis	6:17
5.	"Pure"	Lori Carson, Anton Fier	5:57
6.	"No Skin"	Lori Carson, Anton Fier	6:47
7.	"Gun"	Lori Carson, Anton Fier, Nicky Skopelitis	6:09
8.	"Break in the Road"	Lori Carson, Anton Fier	4:24
9.	"Touch You"	Anton Fier	4:05

== Personnel ==
Musicians

- Lori Carson – vocals, acoustic guitar
- Knox Chandler – guitar
- Bootsy Collins – guitar
- Anton Fier – drums, percussion, programming, production
- Lydia Kavanagh – vocals
- Amanda Kramer – keyboards
- Bill Laswell – bass guitar
- Nicky Skopelitis – guitar, twelve-string guitar

Production and additional personnel

- Bruce Calder – recording
- Rich Costey – recording
- Oz Fritz – mixing, recording
- Garry Rindfuss – recording
- Matt Stein – mixing, recording
- Masanari Tamai – photography
- Howie Weinberg – mastering
