= This Is How It Feels (album) =

Studio album by the Golden Palominos
- Released: September 28, 1993
- Recorded: January – June 1993 at Greenpoint, Brooklyn, New York
- Genre: Dream pop
- Length: 60:09
- Label: Restless
- Producer: Anton Fier

The Golden Palominos chronology
A History (1986–1989) (1992)	This Is How It Feels (1993)	Pure (1994)

Professional ratings
Review scores
Source	Rating
AllMusic	4/5 stars
Entertainment Weekly	A−
NME	8/10 stars

This Is How It Feels is the sixth album by the Golden Palominos, released on September 28, 1993, by Restless Records. It was the first of two Golden Palominos records to feature vocals by Lori Carson, who also appears on the album's cover.

== Track listing ==
No.	Title	Writer(s)	Length
1.	"Sleepwalk"	Lori Carson, Anton Fier, Bill Laswell	5:12
2.	"Prison of the Rhythm"	Lori Carson, Anton Fier, Bill Laswell	4:54
3.	"I'm Not Sorry"	Lori Carson, Anton Fier, Bill Laswell	5:07
4.	"This Is How It Feels"	Lori Carson, Anton Fier, Bill Laswell	4:45
5.	"To a Stranger"	Anton Fier, Lydia Kavanagh, Bill Laswell	5:41
6.	"The Wonder"	Lori Carson, Anton Fier, Bill Laswell	4:55
7.	"Breakdown"	Lori Carson, Anton Fier, Bill Laswell	4:58
8.	"These Days"	Jackson Browne	4:09
9.	"Rain Holds"	Lori Carson, Anton Fier, Bill Laswell	5:52
10.	"Twist the Knife"	Lori Carson, Anton Fier, Bill Laswell	5:21
11.	"Bird Flying"	Lori Carson, Anton Fier, Bill Laswell	5:54
12.	"A Divine Kiss"	Anton Fier, Lydia Kavanagh, Bill Laswell, Matt Stein	3:15

== Personnel ==
Musicians

- Lori Carson – vocals
- Bootsy Collins – guitar
- Anton Fier – drums, percussion, programming, production, art direction
- Bill Laswell – bass guitar
- Nicky Skopelitis – guitar
- Bernie Worrell – Hammond organ
- Jeff Bova – keyboards, additional programming
- Amanda Kramer – keyboards
- Lydia Kavanagh – vocals on "To a Stranger", "These Days" and "A Divine Kiss"

Production and additional personnel

- Melanie Acevedo – photography
- Bruce Calder – mixing, recording
- Oz Fritz – recording
- Dean Karr – photography
- Matt Stein – programming, mixing, recording
- Howie Weinberg – mastering
