= Drunk with Passion =

Studio album by the Golden Palominos
- Released: September 17, 1991
- Recorded: Greenpoint, Brooklyn, New York
- Genre: Alternative rock
- Length: 50:24
- Label: Nation/Charisma
- Producer: Anton Fier

The Golden Palominos chronology
Thundering Herd: The Best of The Golden Palominos (1991)	Drunk with Passion (1991)	A History (1982–1985) (1992)

Drunk with Passion is the fifth album by the Golden Palominos. It was released in 1991 via Nation/Charisma.

== Critical reception ==
Professional ratings
Review scores
Source	Rating
AllMusic	4/5 stars
Chicago Tribune	2/4 stars
The Encyclopedia of Popular Music	4/5 stars
Entertainment Weekly	B
MusicHound Rock: The Essential Album Guide	2.5/5 stars
The Rolling Stone Album Guide	4/5 stars

Spin praised Bob Mould's turn on "Dying from the Inside Out", but deemed the rest of the album "an overlong, overproduced mess." New York called it "art rock for aging post-punks." The Orlando Sentinel wrote that "Fier now seems to be sleepwalking toward New Age territory."

== Track listing ==
All songs written by Amanda Kramer, Anton Fier and Nicky Skopelitis, except where noted

No.	Title	Writer(s)	Length
1.	"Alive and Living Now"	Michael Stipe, Fier, Skopelitis	5:38
2.	"The Haunting"	Kramer	5:30
3.	"When the Kingdom Calls"		6:26
4.	"A Sigh"		8:36
5.	"Thunder Cries"		4:22
6.	"Hands of Heaven"		5:22
7.	"Dying from the Inside Out"	Bob Mould, Fier, Skopelitis	8:18
8.	"Begin to Return"	Robert Kidney	6:12

== Personnel ==
Musicians

- Amanda Kramer – vocals, keyboards
- Anton Fier – drums, percussion, keyboards on "Hands of Heaven" and "Begin to Return", production
- Bill Laswell – bass guitar, fretless bass on "A Sigh"
- Nicky Skopelitis – guitar, acoustic guitar, Dobro guitar on "Alive and Living Now"

Guest musicians

- Carla Bley – Hammond organ on "Alive and Living Now" and "When the Kingdom Calls"
- Aïyb Dieng – percussion on "A Sigh" and "Hands of Heaven"
- Robert Kidney – vocals and guitar on "Begin to Return"
- Bob Mould – vocals and guitar on "Dying from the Inside Out"
- Michael Stipe – vocals on "Alive and Living Now"
- Richard Thompson – guitar on "Alive and Living Now", "The Haunting", "When the Kingdom Calls", "Hands of Heaven" and "Dying from the Inside Out"

Production and additional personnel

- Chris Bigg – illustrations, design
- David Cook – mixing on "A Sigh", recording
- Oz Fritz – recording
- Mike Krowiak – mixing, recording
- Jeff Lippay – mixing
- Tom Mark – recording
- Steve McLoughlin – recording
- Robert Musso – recording
- Wes Naprstek – recording
- Vaughan Oliver – illustrations, design
- Howie Weinberg – mastering
- John Yates – mixing on "A Sigh"
- Billy Youdelman – recording
