= Surprise (Syd Straw album) =

Studio album by Syd Straw
- Released: 1989
- Genre: Folk rock
- Length: 49:20
- Label: Virgin
- Producers: Syd Straw; Anthony Moore; Van Dyke Parks; Daniel Lanois

Syd Straw chronology
Surprise (1989)	War and Peace (1996)

Surprise is the debut solo album by the American musician Syd Straw, released in 1989. The first single was "Future 40's (String of Pearls)". Straw supported the album with a North American tour, backed by a band that included D.J. Bonebrake and Dave Alvin. Surprise was a commercial disappointment.

== Production ==
The album was produced primarily by Straw, who also wrote or cowrote most of the songs. She spent more than a year recording it at studios in London, New Orleans, New York, Austin, and Los Angeles. "Future 40's (String of Pearls)" was cowritten by Jody Harris and Michael Stipe. "Think Too Hard" was written by Peter Holsapple; Marshall Crenshaw played guitar on it. "Hard Times", coproduced by Van Dyke Parks, was composed by Stephen Foster. Richard Thompson played guitar on "Sphinx". John Doe contributed backing vocals to some of the tracks. Straw considered "The Unanswered Question?" to be a combination of pop music and opera.

== Critical reception ==
Professional ratings
Review scores
Source	Rating
AllMusic	4.5/5 stars
Chicago Sun-Times	4/4 stars
Chicago Tribune	3/4 stars
Robert Christgau	B
Los Angeles Times	3/5 stars
MusicHound Rock: The Essential Album Guide	3/5 stars
The Rolling Stone Album Guide	3/5 stars
St. Petersburg Times	3/5 stars

The New York Times concluded that "perhaps the most striking cut on Surprise is 'Almost Magic', a diaphanously textured showcase of overdubbed vocals on a song in which Ms. Straw pleads for one more chance to hold together a crumbling relationship." Trouser Press determined that the album "boasts a guest list that suggests a hipper version of the bloated superstar processions Peter Asher used to assemble for James Taylor and Linda Ronstadt." The Los Angeles Times wrote that "the slower, softer [songs] ache or rage convincingly, a Talking Heads-style art-funk number hits its groove, a Dylanesque shaggy-dog story ambles along playfully."

Spin opined that "her voice, though beautifully pitched, lacks emotional range." The Globe and Mail called Surprise "both immediately accessible, full of familiar country and pop elements, and bursting with interesting little instrumental and vocal flourishes." The Washington Post deemed the songs "electric, eclectic folk-rock, with elliptical, fragmented lyrics ... and a tendency toward melodic meandering." The Sacramento Bee considered it one of 1989's best debut albums.

AllMusic wrote: "The album's style and production mix jangle pop elements from the preceding decade with a roots rock tone, and the overall result has a healthy folkish disposition. Surprise anticipates what was to come for females in rock during the '90s."

== Track listing ==
No.	Title	Writer(s)	Producer(s)	Length
1.	"Think Too Hard"	Peter Holsapple	Anthony Moore; Syd Straw	3:08
2.	"Heart of Darkness"	Moore; Straw	Moore; Straw	4:26
3.	"Chasing Vapor Trails (His Turn to Cry)"	Frank Fuchs; Straw	Straw	4:16
4.	"Almost Magic"	Matthew Auerbach; Straw	Straw	4:16
5.	"Crazy American"	Moore; Straw	Moore; Straw	4:04
6.	"Hard Times"	Stephen Foster	Straw; Van Dyke Parks	7:02
7.	"Future 40's (String of Pearls)"	Jody Harris; Michael Stipe; Straw	Straw	4:32
8.	"The Unanswered Question?"	Peter Blegvad; Straw	Straw	4:32
9.	"Sphinx"	Blegvad; Straw	Moore; Straw	6:17
10.	"Racing to the Ruins"	Brook Meggs; Straw	Straw	3:50
11.	"Golden Dreams"	Daniel Lanois; Straw	Lanois	2:57
Total length:				49:20

2000 reissue bonus tracks
No.	Title	Writer(s)	Producer(s)	Length
12.	"Learning the Game" (feat. Joe Ely)	Buddy Holly	Straw	3:24
13.	"If You Don't Want My Love"	John Prine; Phil Spector	Straw	3:36
