= No Material =

1989 live album by group No Material

Live album by No Material (Ginger Baker, Sonny Sharrock, Peter Brötzmann, Nicky Skopelitis, and Jan Kazda)
- Released: 1989
- Recorded: March 28, 1987
- Venue: Mühle Hunziken, Rubigen, Switzerland
- Genre: Free jazz
- Length: 54:26
- Label: ITM Records; 1435 CD; 920012

No Material chronology
No Material (1989)	Live in Munich Germany 1987 (2010)

No Material is a live album by the band of the same name, featuring drummer Ginger Baker, electric guitarists Sonny Sharrock and Nicky Skopelitis, saxophonist Peter Brötzmann, and bassist Jan Kazda. It was recorded on March 28, 1987, at Mühle Hunziken in Rubigen, Switzerland, and was released on CD in 1989 by the German label ITM Records. In 2013, ITM reissued the album as a two-CD set, with a second disc containing music that was recorded on March 25, 1987, at Theaterfabrik München in Munich, Germany. These additional tracks had originally been released by the Voiceprint label in 2010 with the title Live in Munich Germany 1987.

No Material was a short-lived group that presented three concerts in less than a week during 1987 before disbanding. The project brought together members of Bill Laswell's Material, Last Exit, Ginger Baker's African Force, and the German band Das Pferd in a free jazz setting, with the group's name derived from the fact that the musicians played totally improvised concerts with no set list.

== Reception ==
Professional ratings
Review scores
Source	Rating
AllMusic	4/5 stars
The Penguin Guide to Jazz	3/4 stars
The Virgin Encyclopedia of Jazz	2/5 stars

In a review for AllMusic, Brian Olewnick wrote: "A perfect album for listeners a bit overwhelmed by Last Exit, as well as those who found Baker's or Skopelitis' records well intentioned but a little on the timid side. Recommended."

Christopher R. Weingarten of The New York Times called the collaboration "a perfect, if not obvious, use of Baker's particular skill set, mixing monster chops with monolithic volume," and commented: "A drummer renowned for his muscle sounds downright modest compared to Brötzmann's corrosive sax and Sharrock's abrasive guitar, but Baker's hard-hitting detonations keep this improv grounded on Earth."

Writing for Bearded Gentlemen Music, Roz Milner remarked: "as a whole, this lineup clicks incredibly well on stage: Brotzmann and Sharrock love to play free and want to push the music into uncharted waters, but the rhythm section of Baker and Kazda generally try to keep things from getting too wild. And in the middle is Skopelitis, whose playing compliments Sharrock's, but also keeps them in line with the rhythm section... It's a nice contrast, neither as intense or hard to listen to as Last Exit can be, but jazzier and more experimental than Baker's work with Air Force or Cream."

== Track listings ==
=== Original release ===
1. "Dishy Billy" (Ginger Baker) – 11:39
2. "Skin the Pizzle" (Sonny Sharrock) – 15:32
3. "Oil of Tongue" (Nicky Skopelitis) – 10:29
4. "One in the Bush is Worth Two in the Hand" (Peter Brötzmann) – 16:39
- Recorded on March 28, 1987, at Mühle Hunziken in Rubigen, Switzerland.

=== Reissue ===
Disc 1

1. "Dishy Billy" (Ginger Baker) – 11:39
2. "Skin the Pizzle" (Sonny Sharrock) – 15:32
3. "Oil of Tongue" (Nicky Skopelitis) – 10:29
4. "One in the Bush is Worth Two in the Hand" (Peter Brötzmann) – 16:39

Disc 2

1. "Piece 1" – 15:08
2. "Interview - Sonny Sharrock" – 0:30
3. "Piece 2" – 10:05
4. "Interview - Nicky Skopelitis" – 0:41
5. "Piece 3" – 12:51
6. "Piece 4" – 15:17
7. "Piece 5" – 1:51
- Disc 1 was recorded on March 28, 1987, at Mühle Hunziken in Rubigen, Switzerland. Disc 2 was recorded on March 25, 1987, at Theaterfabrik München in Munich, Germany.

== Personnel ==
- Peter Brötzmann – saxophone
- Sonny Sharrock – electric guitar
- Nicky Skopelitis – electric guitar
- Jan Kazda – electric bass
- Ginger Baker – drums
