= Every Silver Lining Has a Cloud =

Studio album by Julian Schnabel
- Released: 1995
- Recorded: 1993
- Studio: Greenpoint Studios, Brooklyn and Kampo Studios, New York
- Genre: Rock music
- Length: 60:21
- Label: Island
- Producer: Bill Laswell, Julian Schnabel

Every Silver Lining Has a Cloud is an album by painter Julian Schnabel, recorded in 1993 and released in 1995 on Island Records. The majority of the album was written by Schnabel, with most lyrics dealing with love. The recording personnel included Bill Laswell and his frequent collaborators Buckethead, Bernie Worrell, Nicky Skopelitis, and Anton Fier.

== Critical reception ==
Professional ratings
Review scores
Source	Rating
AllMusic	3/5 stars

The release received mixed reviews. The Globe and Mail noted that "the hired help can't hold together the meandering, self-indulgent songs or hide the fact that Schnabel's sing-speak makes Lou Reed sound like Aaron Neville."

== Track listing ==
All lyrics by Julian Schnabel; except track 13

No.	Title	Writer(s)	Length
1.	"She's Dancing, He's Dreaming"	Brian Kelly, Pat Place	4:46
2.	"I Tried"	Kelly, Carey Burtt, Schnabel	6:52
3.	"The Night We Met"	Burtt, Schnabel	3:17
4.	"If You Leave, Don't Come Back"	Kelly, Schnabel	3:35
5.	"Every Silver Lining Has a Cloud"	Kelly, Burtt, Schnabel	5:54
6.	"When I Was Young"	Burtt, Gary Oldman, Schnabel	6:47
7.	"Juan Belmonte"	Burtt, Schnabel	3:39
8.	"Gary's Song"	Schnabel	4:38
9.	"Immigration Song"	Schnabel	3:39
10.	"Carey Came Back"	Burtt, Schnabel	5:31
11.	"I Wanna Take You Home"	Schnabel	3:28
12.	"It's Great to Be Nine"	Schnabel	4:23
13.	"Apartment #9"	Bobby Austin, Johnny Paycheck	3:52

== Personnel ==
- Julian Schnabel - organ, piano, vocals, backing vocals
- Bernie Worrell - organ, piano, backing vocals
- Julian Bernard Fowler - piano, backing vocals on "I Tried" and "When I Was Young"
- Gary Oldman - piano, vocals on "When I Was Young", voices on "Every Silver Lining Has a Cloud"
- Ted Daniel - flugelhorn on "Juan Belmonte"
- Buckethead - guitar, backing vocals
- Carey Burtt - guitar on "I Wanna Take You Home" and "It's Great to Be Nine"
- Brian Kelly - soprano guitar on "The Night We Met", guitar on "Carey Came Back"
- Brandon Ross - guitar, piano, backing vocals
- Michael Wincott - guitar on "Apartment #9", harmonica on "Carey Came Back"
- Nicky Skopelitis - rhythm guitar, piano, backing vocals
- Electra Stewart - violin, piano, backing vocals on "The Night We Met"
- Michelle Kinney - cello, piano, backing vocals
- Bill Laswell - bass, piano, backing vocals
- Anton Fier - drums, backing vocals
- Barkisu - vocals on "Carey Came Home"
- Henry Threadgill - string and brass arrangements

Technical

- Robert Musso - engineer
- Imad Mansour - assistant engineer
- Oz Fritz - engineer, mixing
- Howie Weinberg - mastering
- Julian Schnabel - art direction
- Brian Kelly - design
