= Carey Burtt =

Filmmaker and musician

Carey Donald Burtt (born June 17, 1962) is a filmmaker and musician based in New York City, mainly working in the underground genre.

== Early life and education ==
A native of Cape Elizabeth, Maine, Burtt is the son of David R. Burtt Jr. and Barbara Carey Burtt. His father worked in the sales divisions of WMTW (TV) and WCSH; serving as National Sales Manager for twenty years for the latter organization. He was educated at Cape Elizabeth Middle School and Cape Elizabeth High School (CEHS); graduating from the latter in 1981. While a high school student at Cape Elizabeth, he won second prize in the Maine Student Film Festival (MSFF) for the film Killer Pop Tarts. At the age of 16, he was awarded the Young Author Award by the MSFF in 1979. That year he submitted six films to this competition in a variety of categories, and according to the festival's sponsor, "just blew away the competition", leading to a special award being given just to him. His entries in the 1980 MSFF included Hitchhike and Santa Claus−Hitler; winning first prize in the ages 16-19 category that year.

Burtt attended the University of Maine at Orono and studied film at New York University Tisch School of the Arts. In 1993 the Maine Alliance of Media Arts profiled Burtt in the television program The Best of Fifteen Years which was broadcast on the Maine Public Broadcasting Network. He was living in Los Angeles at the time this program was made.

== Films ==
For his early work Burtt worked in 8 and 16mm film. Jack Sargeant commented that Burtt's works are "equally engaged in presenting the audience with the nether regions of the psyche as manifested via the darkest forms of paranoia, psychosis and insanity." He also noted that themes of mutilation and insanity occur in multiple Burtt films, specifically The Psychotic Odyssey of Richard Chase and The Death of Sex.

The Psychotic Odyssey of Richard Chase, which used Barbie and Ken dolls, primitive drawings, and slowed-down audio to cover the murders committed by Richard Chase, was screened at the 1999 New York Underground Film Festival, as well as Other Cinema's 2008 Experiments in Terror video exhibition and the 2013 retrospective for the Chicago Underground Film Festival. The film was included in the 2001 exhibition "Bad Trips: New Directions in Independent Horror" at the Yerba Buena Center for the Arts in San Francisco. It was later released as part of two anthology sets by Troma Entertainment and Microcinema. Reviewers for DVD Talk and the North Adams Transcript reviewed the short favorably. The Transcript's reviewer found that Burtt's methods made the short "profoundly creepy" and that "it's the kind of experimental horror that many would never consider." The reviewer for DVD Talk noted that while Burtt "seemingly trivializes Chase's crimes through made-up and mutilated dolls and soupy terror-narration. In actuality he's doubling the true horror and pathos through brilliant misdirection."

Burtt's 1999 short Mind Control Made Easy or How to Become a Cult Leader was featured in the 2005 Hell on Reels: Astoria Moving Image Festival. An instructional film outlining the techniques used by destructive cults, Mind Control was also featured on Supersphere.com where it received an audience award. Fragments from Mind Control have been used by Flying Lotus' alter ego Captain Murphy on the album Duality, released in 2012. Burtt's films have been shown in several festivals including New York and Chicago Underground and The FanTasia Film Festival. In January 2009 the Boston Underground Film Festival held a retrospective screening event of his work.

In 2004 Burtt completed his first feature, A Forked World which was co-written and co-directed by Tucson Weekly film critic James DiGiovanna. It was screened at the Arizona International Film Festival in 2005. That same year it won "Most Effectively Offensive" at the Boston Underground Film Festival.

In 2019 Burtt completed his second feature Corpus Chaosum which won best experimental film at the 2021 First Hermetic International Film Festival.

== Music ==
Carey's Problem formed in the summer of 1986 with Cindy Brolsma and Lisa Jenio. The band released the album Arena of Shame in 1990, produced by Dave Sardy. The song "Led Zeppelin" had college radio play and was featured in the Steve Zahn film Freak Talks About Sex which played on Cinemax.

Gigi Disco Rock was formed in 1998 and put out two CDs: "Will You Love Me?" and "More Songs For Clucky."

In 1992 Burtt composed and played guitar for five songs for the 1995 album Every Silver Lining Has a Cloud by Julian Schnabel.

== Personal life ==
In June 2005 Burtt married Melissa Rachleff in Manhattan. His wife, Melissa Rachleff Burtt, is Clinical Professor of Visual Arts Administration at New York University's Steinhardt School of Culture, Education, and Human Development.

== Filmography ==
- Till Death Do You Part (1974) - Reg 8mm - 4 mins
- Earthquake (1974) - Reg 8mm - 19 mins
- Bionic Brothers (1974) - Reg 8mm - 5 mins
- Hit Man (1976) - Super 8mm - 7 mins (color b&w)
- Killer Poptarts (1976) - Super 8mm - 2 mins
- It Thrived On Monkeys (then there were none) (1977) 06/18/77 - Super 8mm - 5 mins
- The Star Wars Aptitude Test (1977) - Regular 8mm - 5 mins
- Vampire's Apprentice (1977) - Super 8mm - 15 mins
- Odysseus and the Cyclops (1978) - Super 8mm - 2.5 mins
- The Race (1978) - Super 8mm - 2 mins
- Hitch Hike (1979) - Super 8mm - 6 mins
- Extraordinary People (1980) - Super 8mm - 8 mins
- Eulogy (1980) - Super 8mm - 3.5 mins
- Afternoon of an Earwig (1980) - Super 8mm - 4 mins
- The World In One Take (1981) - Super 8mm - (B&W Color) - 8 mins
- Awakening Son (1982) - Super 8mm - 19 mins
- Devil War Movie (1982) - Super 8mm - 6mins (B&W)
- Framing Bitches (1988) - unfinished - Super 8mm short - 7 mins
- Hey Mister, You're in the Girls’ Room (1990) - 16mm - 5 mins
- City of Feelings (1990) - Finished on DV (16mm print AKA “Festival of Feelings”) - 20 mins
- The Death of Sex (1998) - 16mm - 5 mins
- The Psychotic Odyssey of Richard Chase (1998) - 16mm - 7 mins
- Mind Control Made Easy (or how to become a cult leader) (1999) - 16mm - 13 mins
- The Dissociative Disorder Movie (2000) - Remade in 2010 - DV - approx 20mins
- Sun of God (2003) - 5 mins 16mm DV
- A Forked World (2004) - DV Feature made with James DiGiovanna - 1hr 22min
- Through a Gash Deathly (2006) - 16mm finished on DV - 7 mins
- Spirits of Authority (2006) - DV - 5 mins
- Dream of a Ridiculous Man (2009) - 16mm / DV - finished on DV - 11 mins
- Dead Set (2009) - Super 8mm - Finished on DV - 5 mins
- The Dissociative Disorder Movie (2010) - DV - 11 mins
- How Not To Be Stupid (a guide to critical thinking) (2011) - 16mm/DV - finished on DV - 9 mins
- Blood & Fire (2011) - HDV / 16mm - finished on HDV - 10 mins
- Helping: with Travis (2012) - HDV - 12 mins
- Pigs & Vampires (2012) - HD Video - 10 mins
- Jesus Loves Me: now how do I get him to stop calling? (2012) - HD Video - 6 mins
- The Doors of Reflection (2017) - HD Video - 3 mins
- Corpus Chaosum (2019) - HD Video Feature - 1 hr 15 mins
- Embracism (2020) - HD Video - 5 mins
- Cosmetic Consciousness (2020) - HD Video Feature - 1hr 13 mins
- Malevolent Intelligence (2020) - HD Video Feature - 1hr 30 mins
- The Demonic Option (2020) - HD Video Feature - 58 mins
- Gaslighting: Fact or Fiction? (2021) - HD Video - 10 mins
- Heavenly Resentments (2021) - HD Video - 1hr 11 mins
- Art Film Retrospective (2021) - HD Video - 37 mins
- Sensible Malevolence (2022) - HD Video - 1hr 19 mins
- Some People Like Pitbulls (2024) - HD Video - 94 mins
- There's a Demon Inside You (2024) - HD Video - 5 mins
