= A Good Country Mile =

Studio album by Kevn Kinney and The Golden Palominos
- Released: February 21, 2012
- Recorded: One East Recording, New York City
- Genre: Americana
- Length: 59:14
- Producer: Anton Fier

The Golden Palominos chronology
Dead Inside (1996)	A Good Country Mile (2012)

Professional ratings
Review scores
Source	Rating
Allmusic	4/5 stars

A Good Country Mile is a collaboration between Kevn Kinney and The Golden Palominos, released independently on February 21, 2012. It is the final Golden Palominos album before the death of Anton Fier in 2022.

== Track listing ==
No.	Title	Writer(s)	Length
1.	"Never Gonna Change"	Jason Isbell	5:11
2.	"Gotta Move On (Again)"	Anton Fier, Kevn Kinney	3:51
3.	"Challenge"	Anton Fier, Kevn Kinney	5:54
4.	"Hurricane"	Kevn Kinney	3:59
5.	"Wild Dog Moon Pt. 2"	Anton Fier, Kevn Kinney	5:30
6.	"A Good Country Mile"	Kevn Kinney	9:45
7.	"Set in Stone"	Anton Fier, Kevn Kinney	4:18
8.	"Bird"	Kevn Kinney	9:09
9.	"In the Land (Of Things That Used to Be)"	Anton Fier, Kevn Kinney	6:10
10.	"Southwestern State"	Jason Ross	5:33

== Personnel ==
Musicians

- Jon Cowherd – Hammond organ, piano
- Anton Fier – drums, percussion, production, art direction, illustration, design
- Andy Hess – bass guitar
- Kevn Kinney – vocals, harmonica, guitar, acoustic guitar
- Aaron Lee Tasjan – guitar, acoustic guitar, backing vocals
- Eleanor Whitmore – violin
- Jim Campilongo – guitar on "Never Gonna Change"
- Chris Masterson – guitar on "Gotta Move On (Again)", "Wild Dog Moon Pt. 2" and "Bird"
- Leslie Mendelson – piano on "Bird"
- Tony Scherr – guitar, acoustic guitar and bass guitar on "A Good Country Mile" and "Southwestern State"
- Lianne Smith – backing vocals on "Never Gonna Change" and "Southwestern State"

Production and additional personnel

- Martin Bisi – recording
- Jeffery Conn – photography
- Yohei Goto – mixing, recording
- Chris Griffin – recording
- Scott Hull – mastering
- Michael Jung – recording
- Kristy Knight – art direction, illustration, design
- Tony Maimone – recording
