= Thomas Dozol =

French photographer

Thomas Dozol is a French photographer.

== Biography ==
Dozol was born on Martinique. He studied performing arts at the Ecole Florent and applied mathematics and social sciences at Université Paris Dauphine.

Dozol moved to New York in 2002. He came to the city to pursue acting, but he soon transitioned to photography by documenting other performers. This work lead to commissions from a number of publications including Monopol, Interview, Another Man, and Vogue Paris.

In 2008, Dozol had his first solo show titled I'll Be Your Mirror. It featured images of 25 of his family, friends, and acquaintances that were shot 15 minutes after the subjects got out of the shower. The project took three years to photograph all the different subjects in their bathrooms. Those featured included Gwyneth Paltrow, Michael Stipe, Wolfgang Tillmans, and Jamie Bochert.

In 2025, Dozol exhibited his solo show Time and Space at The Horse, a contemporary art gallery in Dublin.
