= War and Peace (Syd Straw album) =

Studio album by Syd Straw
- Released: 1996
- Studio: The Studio, Springfield, Missouri
- Label: Capricorn
- Producer: Syd Straw

Syd Straw chronology
Surprise (1989)	War and Peace (1996)	Pink Velour (2008)

War and Peace is the second album by the American musician Syd Straw, released in 1996. Straw had been without a record label for four years prior to signing with Capricorn Records. The album title jokingly refers to War and Peace's almost 60-minute running time. The first single was "Love, and the Lack of It".

== Production ==
The album was produced by Straw. She recorded it, in two weeks, in Springfield, Missouri, where she was backed by the cult band the Skeletons. The sessions were paid for by Straw's manager boyfriend.

Many of the songs are about Straw's divorce and past relationships. "Million Miles" was cowritten with Johnette Napolitano. "Static" was originally an instrumental track, composed by Jeff Tweedy; Straw maintains she wrote and recorded the song with an engineer while Wilco was at lunch. "Almost as Blue" is dedicated to Kurt Cobain.

== Critical reception ==
Professional ratings
Review scores
Source	Rating
AllMusic	3/5 stars
Chicago Tribune	3.5/4 stars
Robert Christgau	(dud)
The Encyclopedia of Popular Music	3/5 stars
The Indianapolis Star	4/4 stars
Los Angeles Times	3/4 stars
MusicHound Rock: The Essential Album Guide	4/5 stars

Trouser Press wrote that "Straw's vocals are tremendous throughout, and the album has a tougher tone musically than the overly glossy Surprise." The Atlanta Journal-Constitution deemed the album "a resilient cycle of country-rock songs about hopes, longings and the memories of complicated relationships." The Dayton Daily News concluded that "her infectious roots rock melodies are surprisingly upbeat, given the subject matter, and her rich voice—capable of fierce passion or a soft country lilt—is simply beyond compare."

Stereo Review determined that "it's her intelligent lyrics and soaring choruses that make War and Peace a standout—the way she plays the victim/victor personas off each other." The Hartford Courant praised the Skeletons, writing that "Straw has just the right twang and snap to back her solid, affecting songs." The St. Louis Post-Dispatch labeled the album "a fair-to-middlin' collection of pop dirges and country-rock tunes on which her voice veers from adequate to lovely." The New York Times stated that "songs settle in between country rock and folk rock, with well-turned melodies and steady-strummed guitars... Singing about heartache, Ms. Straw cuts self-pity with determined resilience." The Waterloo Region Record listed it as the second best album of 1996.

AllMusic called the album "a jangly-guitar, singer/songwriter folk-rock feast and a glimpse into an apparently tortured soul."

== Track listing ==
No.	Title	Length
1.	"The Toughest Girl in the World"
2.	"Million Miles"
3.	"Time Has Done This"
4.	"Love, and the Lack of It"
5.	"CBGB's"
6.	"All Things Change"
7.	"Madrid"
8.	"Almost as Blue"
9.	"Water, Please"
10.	"X-Ray"
11.	"Howl"
12.	"Static"
13.	"Black Squirrel"
14.	"The Train That Takes You Away"
