= James DiGiovanna =

- Born: June 1, 1965 (age 60); Alabama, USA
- Occupation(s): Film critic, academic

James DiGiovanna is a film reviewer and filmmaker, and the author of a number of published short stories. Together with Bob Grimm and Colin Boyd, he was one of three cinema writers on the staff of Tucson Weekly. He is currently an assistant professor at the Department of Philosophy at the John Jay College of Criminal Justice.

== Education ==
DiGiovanna received his PhD from the State University of New York at Stony Brook in 2001. His doctoral thesis, Ethics and Aesthetics of Self-Creation, is an exploration of the idea, in Pico, Milton, Blake, Kierkegaard and Nietzsche, that humans are tasked with creating themselves.

== Career ==
Together with Carey Burtt, DiGiovanna co-wrote, directed, and produced the film, A Forked World (2004). in addition to several other collaborations. In his blog The Daily Dish, Andrew Sullivan described their parody of a political attack ad on Immanuel Kant as "hilarious."

DiGiovanna formerly taught at SUNY Stony Brook's Manhattan graduate program in philosophy of art. He currently teaches at John Jay College of Criminal Justice. His philosophical work has touched on the nature of personal identity and questions of understanding.

His writing, which appeared regularly in the Tucson Weekly, includes an article in High Noon On The Electronic Frontier (MIT Press) and stories in 20 X 18 (Cooper Union Press), Blue Moon Review, and Sporkpress.

He maintains the website "Spoonbot.com."

== Publications and articles ==
- DiGiovanna, James. 1996. "Losing Your Voice on the Internet" in High Noon on the Electronic Frontier: Conceptual Issues in Cyberspace (Cambridge, MA: MIT).
- DiGiovanna, James. 2008. "Is It Right To Make A Robin?" in "Batman and Philosophy: The Dark Knight of the Soul" (Hoboken, NJ: John Wiley and Sons).
- DiGiovanna, James. 2009. "Dr. Manhattan, I Presume" in "Watchmen and Philosophy: A Rorschach Test" (Hoboken, NJ: John Wiley and Sons).
