= Chickasaw Mudd Puppies =

American rock band

The Chickasaw Mudd Puppies are an American rock band, formed by Brant Slay (vocalist, washboard, harmonica) and Ben Reynolds (vocalist, percussion, electric guitar). The band played a major part of the music of Athens, Georgia, and were protégés of Michael Stipe (R.E.M.).

== Career ==
The Chickasaw Mudd Puppies recorded two albums, White Dirt (1990) and 8 Track Stomp (1991), working with producers Stipe, Willie Dixon and John Keane. The band broke up soon after. Reynolds has since played guitar and sang with the band Workhorses of the Entertainment/Recreational Industry and taught photography at the Lamar Dodd School of Art at the University of Georgia.

Despite their famous producers, who also backed up the duo in the studio, Chickasaw Mudd Puppies received little popular attention outside of Athens. Their use of traditional and "invented" percussion instruments, including the stomp board (invented), washboard, cowbells, and even cans, combined with the occasional dobro and lap steel guitars, gave their music an Americana sound.

Their reunion after a 20-year hiatus was sparked by recent interests in their music, including songs in the films The Mechanic and Tracing Cowboys. Alan Cowart, drummer of the Jacksonville band, The Beggar Weeds (also Stipe-produced), joined the band in early 2011. The three musicians appeared together at the 2011 SXSW Music Festival in Austin Texas.

== Discography ==
=== Albums ===
Year	Name	Format	Label	Catalog Number	Producer
1990	White Dirt	LP/CD/Cassette	Wing/Texas Hotel	843 217-1/2/4	John Keane and Michael Stipe
1991	8 Track Stomp	LP/CD/Cassette	Wing/Mercury	843 935-1/2/4	Willie Dixon and Michael Stipe
2023	Fall Line	LP/CD	Strolling Bones Records	SB9 CD/LP	Brant Slay, Ben Reynolds, Alan Cowart

=== Promotional singles ===
Year	Tracks	Format	Label	Catalog Number
1990	"McIntosh"/"Lookout"	CD	Wing/Texas Hotel	CDP 233
1991	"Words and Knives"/"Cold Blue"/"Lodi" (live)/"Nothin' " (live)	CD	Wing/Mercury	CDP 433
1991	"Do You Remember"/interview b/w "Do You Remember"/interview	12"	Wing/Mercury	PRO 912-1
