= A Dead Horse =

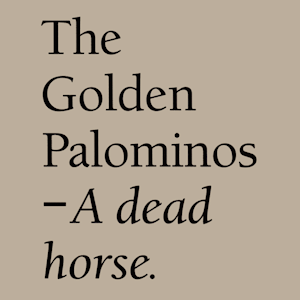

Studio album by The Golden Palominos
- Released: January 1, 1989
- Studio: Platinum Island, New York City
- Genre: Alternative rock
- Length: 41:10
- Label: Celluloid
- Producer: Anton Fier

The Golden Palominos chronology
Blast of Silence (Axed My Baby for a Nickel) (1986)	A Dead Horse (1989)	Thundering Herd: The Best of The Golden Palominos (1991)

Professional ratings
Review scores
Source	Rating
Allmusic	3/5 stars
Hi-Fi News & Record Review	A:1*

A Dead Horse is the fourth album by The Golden Palominos, released on January 1, 1989, by Celluloid Records.

== Track listing ==
No.	Title	Writer(s)	Length
1.	"Wild River"	Robert Kidney	4:43
2.	"Shattered Image"	Amanda Kramer, Anton Fier, Nicky Skopelitis	5:25
3.	"Angel of Death"	Amanda Kramer, Anton Fier, Nicky Skopelitis	4:44
4.	"Lucky"	Robert Kidney	4:56
5.	"Darklands"	Amanda Kramer, Anton Fier, Nicky Skopelitis	6:48
6.	"A Letter Back"	Robert Kidney	7:04
7.	"Over"	Amanda Kramer, Anton Fier, Nicky Skopelitis	7:38

== Personnel ==
Musicians

- Jeff Bova – keyboards, programming
- Aïyb Dieng – percussion
- Anton Fier – drums, additional production
- Robert Kidney – guitar
- Amanda Kramer – vocals
- Bill Laswell – bass violin
- Chuck Leavell – Keyboards
- Larry Saltzman – guitar
- Nicky Skopelitis – guitar
- Mick Taylor – guitar
- Bernie Worrell – Hammond organ

Production and additional personnel

- Oz Fritz – recording, mixing
- William Garrett – recording
- John Herman – recording
- Steve Klatz – drum technician
- Robert Longo – design, photography
- Christiane Mathan – design
- Robert Musso – recording
- Frank W. Ockenfels– photography
- Steve Rinkoff – mixing, recording
