= Dead Inside (album) =

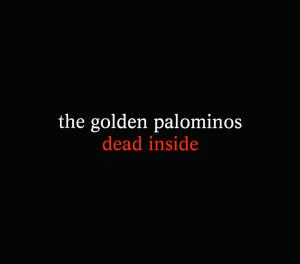

Studio album by the Golden Palominos
- Released: October 8, 1996
- Recorded: June 1995 – June 1996 at Greenpoint, Brooklyn, New York
- Genre: Trip hop, spoken word
- Length: 56:11
- Label: Restless
- Producer: Anton Fier

The Golden Palominos chronology
Pure (1994)	Dead Inside (1996)	A Good Country Mile (2012)

Professional ratings
Review scores
Source	Rating
AllMusic	3/5 stars
Entertainment Weekly	A

Dead Inside is the eighth album by the Golden Palominos, released on October 8, 1996, by Restless Records. It was the group's final studio album until the release of A Good Country Mile sixteen years later.

== Track listing ==
All lyrics are written by Nicole Blackman; all music is composed by Anton Fier, except "The Ambitions Are" co-written by Knox Chandler.

No.	Title	Length
1.	"Victim"	5:59
2.	"Belfast"	4:40
3.	"Ride"	4:52
4.	"The Ambitions Are"	8:23
5.	"Drown"	5:23
6.	"Holy"	4:51
7.	"You Are Never Ready"	5:23
8.	"Metal Eye"	6:34
9.	"Thirst"	4:48
10.	"Curses"	5:18

== Personnel ==
Musicians

- Nicole Blackman – spoken word
- Knox Chandler – guitar, acoustic guitar
- Anton Fier – drums, percussion, production, art direction
- Bill Laswell – bass guitar
- Nicky Skopelitis – guitar on "Ride"

Production and additional personnel

- John Brown – art direction
- Greg Calbi – mastering
- Bruce Calder – recording
- Dan Gellert – mixing, recording
