= 8 Track Stomp =

Studio album by Chickasaw Mudd Puppies
- Released: 1991
- Genre: Blues rock, blues
- Label: Wing
- Producer: Michael Stipe, Willie Dixon

Chickasaw Mudd Puppies chronology
White Dirt (1990)	8 Track Stomp (1991)	Fall Line (2023)

8 Track Stomp is the second album by the American musical duo Chickasaw Mudd Puppies, released in 1991. Its title refers to their love of 8-track cartridges. The duo supported the album by touring with the Feelies and then Flat Duo Jets. "Do You Remember", for which a video was shot, was a minor college radio hit. Members Brant Slay and Ben Reynolds described their sound as "porch music".

== Production ==
The album was produced by Michael Stipe and Willie Dixon; the duo's other choice was Tom Waits, who was enthusiastic but busy. Dixon associates Cash McCall and Al Duncan contributed to the recording sessions. "Oh, Yeah" was written by Dixon, who also used a copy of one of his albums as a percussive device on "Cicada". Stipe played tuba and provided backing vocals on some of the tracks; Mamie Fike played violin. "Omaha (Sharpless)" is about the farm in Omaha, Georgia, owned by Slay's parents.

== Critical reception ==
Professional ratings
Review scores
Source	Rating
Calgary Herald	A−
The Cincinnati Enquirer	2/5 stars
The Cincinnati Post	2.5/5 stars
The Philadelphia Inquirer	2.5/4 stars
The Rolling Stone Album Guide	3/5 stars
The Tampa Tribune	2.5/4 stars

The Fort Worth Star-Telegram called the album "a raucous, hilarious sing-along." The Cincinnati Post said that it sounds like a "post-modern fish fry." The Cincinnati Enquirer labeled 8 Track Stomp "Southern art-school blues." The Philadelphia Inquirer opined that the duo "plays the blues with the joyous gee-whiz affectation of shut-in suburban kids whose main cultural reference is cartoons." Spin stated that the duo "take a time-tested combination—wild voice plus gonzo guitar—and reduce it to a bunch of self-conscious mannerisms".

The Courier-Journal said that the album "is a passel of field-holler fun, weird charm and ingratiating eccentricity." The Tampa Tribune concluded that it "gains resonance over the course of a baker's dozen ragged and rich tracks." The Indianapolis Star praised the "odd but inspired" blues rock. The Calgary Herald likened 8 Track Stomp to "the Stone's 12 × 5 circa 1991." The Santa Fe Reporter listed it among the best albums of 1991.

== Track listing ==
No.	Title	Length
1.	"Cicada"
2.	"Jambalaya"
3.	"Night Time (Ain't Got No Eyes)"
4.	"Moving So Fast"
5.	"Shannon Love Bisquit"
6.	"Wasp"
7.	"Bill"
8.	"Oh, Yeah"
9.	"Cold Blue"
10.	"Omaha (Sharpless)"
11.	"Superior"
12.	"Do You Remember"
13.	"Words & Knives"
