= Blast of Silence (Axed My Baby for a Nickel) =

Studio album by The Golden Palominos
- Released: February 13, 1986
- Studio: RPM, New York City
- Genre: Alternative rock
- Length: 44:10
- Label: Celluloid
- Producer: Anton Fier

The Golden Palominos chronology
Visions of Excess (1985)	Blast of Silence (1986)	A Dead Horse (1989)

Professional ratings
Review scores
Source	Rating
AllMusic	3/5 stars
Robert Christgau	B−

Blast of Silence is the third album by The Golden Palominos, released in 1986 by Celluloid Records.

== Track listing ==
No.	Title	Writer(s)	Length
1.	"I've Been the One"	Lowell George	3:18
2.	"Something Becomes Nothing"	Peter Blegvad, Anton Fier, Matthew Sweet	5:08
3.	"The Push and the Shove"	Robert Kidney	4:27
4.	"(Something Else Is) Working Harder"	Peter Blegvad, Anton Fier, Jody Harris	5:19
5.	"Angels"	Peter Blegvad, Anton Fier, Syd Straw	5:01
6.	"Diamond"	Peter Holsapple	4:40
7.	"Faithless Heart"	Don Dixon, Anton Fier, Jody Harris	4:04
8.	"Work Was New"	Peter Blegvad, Anton Fier	4:08
9.	"Strong, Simple Silences"	Peter Blegvad, Anton Fier	4:19
10.	"Brides of Jesus"	Lowell George, Bill Payne	3:34

== Personnel ==
Musicians

- Peter Blegvad – guitar, vocals on "Work Was New", vocals and acoustic guitar on "Strong, Simple Silences"
- Carla Bley – piano on "Strong, Simple Silences"
- Jack Bruce – vocals and bass guitar on "(Something Else Is) Working Harder"
- T-Bone Burnett – guitar on "Work Was New", guitar and vocals on "Strong, Simple Silences"
- Tony Conniff – bass guitar
- Aïyb Dieng – percussion on "I've Been the One"
- Don Dixon – vocals and guitar on "Faithless Heart"
- Anton Fier – drums, percussion, additional production
- Jody Harris – guitar
- Lisa Herman – piano on "I've Been the One" and "Brides of Jesus"
- Robert Kidney – vocals and guitar on "The Push and the Shove"
- Bill Laswell – bass guitar
- Nicky Skopelitis – guitar on "Something Becomes Nothing" and "(Something Else Is) Working Harder"
- Sneaky Pete Kleinow – steel guitar on "I've Been the One" and "Faithless Heart"
- Larry Saltzman – acoustic guitar on "(Something Else Is) Working Harder"
- Chris Stamey – bass guitar on "I've Been the One" and "Brides of Jesus"
- Syd Straw – vocals
- Matthew Sweet – vocals on "Something Becomes Nothing"
- Pat Thrall – acoustic guitar on "Strong, Simple Silences"
- Bernie Worrell – Hammond organ

Production

- Larry Hirsch – recording
- Don Hünerberg – recording
- Mike Krowiak – engineering, recording
- Jeff Lippay – recording
