= The Golden Palominos (album) =

Studio album by the Golden Palominos
- Released: May 20, 1983
- Recorded: 1983
- Studios: Radio City Music Hall and OAO, New York
- Genre: Avant-funk
- Length: 43:04
- Label: Celluloid
- Producers: Anton Fier, Bill Laswell

The Golden Palominos chronology
| The Golden Palominos (1983) | Visions of Excess (1985) |

The Golden Palominos is the debut studio album by the alternative rock band the Golden Palominos. It was released on May 20, 1983, on Celluloid Records.

== Critical reception ==
Professional ratings
Review scores
| Source | Rating |
|---|---|
| AllMusic | 3/5 stars |
| Robert Christgau | A− |
| The Encyclopedia of Popular Music | 4/5 stars |
| The Rolling Stone Album Guide | 4/5 stars |

Trouser Press called the album "above-average avant-funk," writing that it "would have been a milestone if it had sounded anything like the Palominos’ New York gigs."

== Track listing ==
| No. | Title | Writer(s) | Length |
|---|---|---|---|
| 1. | "Clean Plate" | Anton Fier, Arto Lindsay | 6:30 |
| 2. | "Hot Seat" | Fier, Mark E. Miller, Charles K. Noyes | 5:16 |
| 3. | "Under the Cap" | Fier, Lindsay | 5:36 |
| 4. | "Monday Night" | Fier, Lindsay | 6:31 |
| 5. | "Cookout" | Fier | 4:40 |
| 6. | "I.D." | Fier, Lindsay | 6:48 |
| 7. | "Two Sided Fist" | Fier, Fred Frith, Lindsay | 7:43 |

== Personnel ==
Musicians

- Michael Beinhorn – drums and Oberheim DMX on "Hot Seat", piano on "Cookout"
- Anton Fier – drums, Oberheim DMX, percussion, production, mixing
- Fred Frith – guitar, violin
- Bill Laswell – bass guitar, production, mixing
- Thi-Linh Le – vocals on "Monday Night", design, photography
- Arto Lindsay – vocals, guitar, additional production
- Mark E. Miller – vocals on "Hot Seat", turntables on "Hot Seat" and "Monday Night"
- David Moss – percussion on "Clean Plate", "Under the Cap" and "Two Sided Fist"
- Nicky Skopelitis – guitar on "Monday Night" and "I.D."
- Jamaaladeen Tacuma – Steinberger bass guitar on "Clean Plate" and "Two Sided Fist"
- Roger Trilling – tape on "Cookout"
- John Zorn – alto saxophone, clarinet, game calls

Production and additional personnel

- Martin Bisi – additional production, mixing
- Peter Blegvad – vocal coach
- Don Hünerberg – engineering
- Mike Krowiak – additional engineering
- Jan Luss – design
