= Visions of Excess =

Studio album by the Golden Palominos
- Released: 1985
- Studios: Radio City Music and Evergreen Studio Hall
- Genre: Post-punk
- Length: 37:09
- Label: Celluloid
- Producer: Anton Fier

The Golden Palominos chronology
The Golden Palominos (1983)	Visions of Excess (1985)	Blast of Silence (1986)

Visions of Excess is the second album by the Golden Palominos. The band's line-up was substantially different from their first album. It includes a cover of Moby Grape's "Omaha", with Michael Stipe singing lead.

== Critical reception ==
Professional ratings
Review scores
Source	Rating
AllMusic	4.5/5 stars
Robert Christgau	B+
The Encyclopedia of Popular Music	4/5 stars
The Rolling Stone Album Guide	4.5/5 stars

Trouser Press called Visions of Excess "a brilliant neo-pop album of tuneful, lyrical songs." John Leland at Spin wrote, "The generally stellar accompaniment occasionally gets buried in the blustery mix. But more often, it gets subsumed in songwriting that is sometimes just adequate.

== Track listing ==
No.	Title	Writer(s)	Length
1.	"Boy (Go)"	Anton Fier, Jody Harris, Michael Stipe	5:30
2.	"Clustering Train"	Fier, Harris, Stipe	6:07
3.	"Omaha"	Skip Spence	3:11
4.	"The Animal Speaks"	Robert Kidney	4:07
5.	"Silver Bullet"	Jack Bruce, Paul Cullum, Fier, Harris, Syd Straw	5:09
6.	"(Kind of) True"	Fier, Harris, Straw	4:47
7.	"Buenos Aires"	Fier, Nicky Skopelitis, Straw	3:48
8.	"Only One Party"	Fier, Harris, Arto Lindsay	4:30

Alternative album cover

== Personnel ==
- Anton Fier – drums, DMX, percussion (all tracks)
- Bill Laswell – bass guitar (all tracks)
- Jody Harris – guitars, slide guitar (tracks 1, 2, 4, 5, 6, 7, 8)
- Richard Thompson – guitars (tracks 1, 5, 6, 7)
- Michael Hampton – guitar (track 2)
- Henry Kaiser – guitars (track 3)
- Nicky Skopelitis – guitars (track 7)
- Arto Lindsay – guitar, Vocals (Track 8)
- Chris Stamey – guitar, piano, vocals (tracks 1, 2, 3, 6)
- Bernie Worrell – Hammond organ (tracks 1, 2, 4, 5)
- Carla Bley – Hammond organ (track 7)
- Syd Straw – vocals (tracks 1, 5, 6, 7)
- Michael Stipe – vocals (tracks 1, 2, 3)
- Jack Bruce – vocals, harp (track 5)
- John Lydon – vocals (track 4)
