= Michael Stipe =

American singer (born 1960)

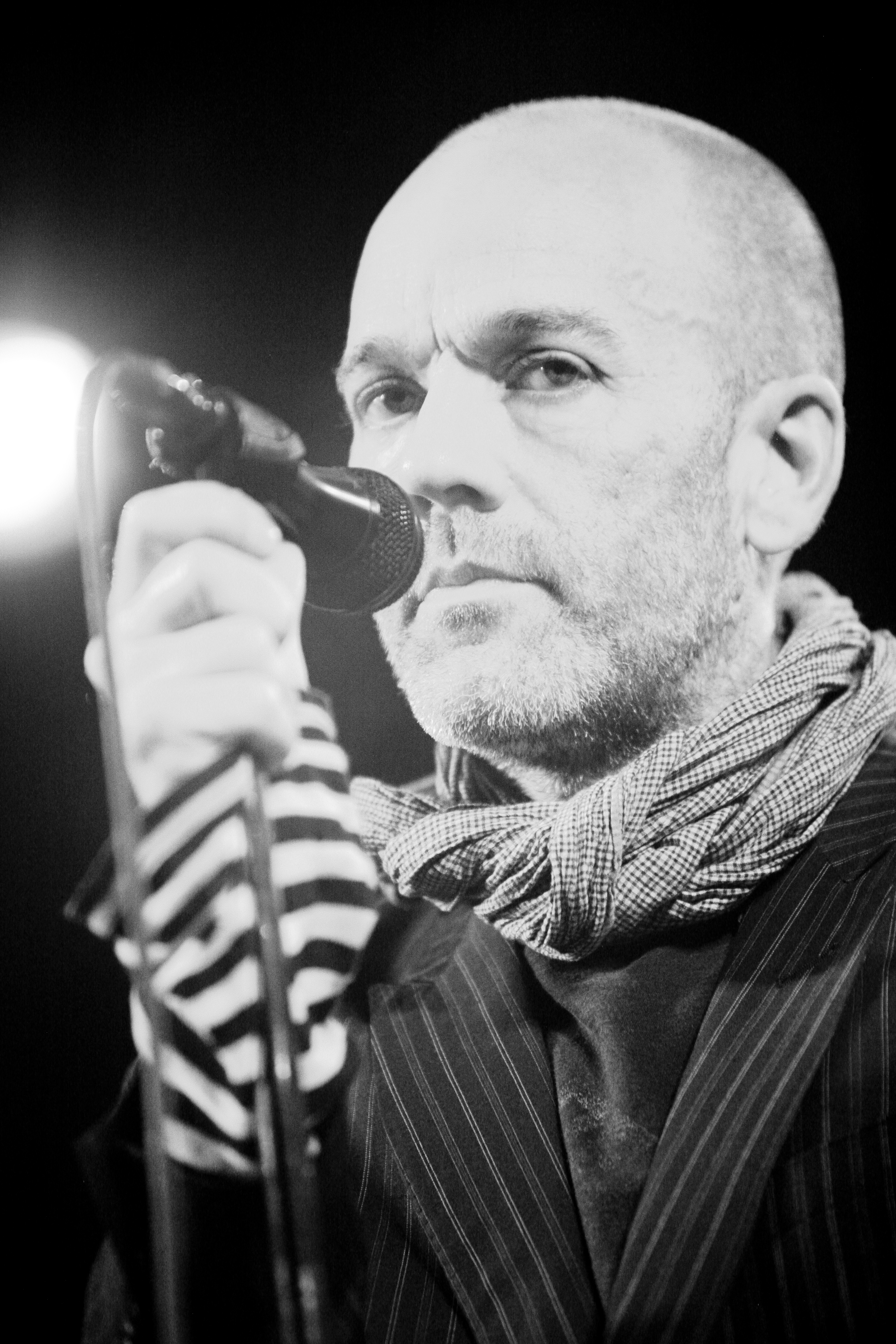
- Stipe in 2008

Background information
- Born: John Michael Stipe; January 4, 1960 (age 66); Decatur, Georgia, U.S.
- Genres: Alternative rock; folk rock; college rock; jangle pop
- Occupations: Singer; songwriter; producer; visual artist; director
- Years active: 1980–present
- Formerly of: R.E.M.
- Partner: Thomas Dozol

John Michael Stipe (/ˈstaɪp/; born January 4, 1960) is an American singer, songwriter and artist, best known as the lead singer and lyricist of the alternative rock band R.E.M.

Around 1980, Stipe began attending the University of Georgia in Athens, Georgia, where he became involved in the local college rock and jangle pop scene. He formed R.E.M. after meeting his bandmates at the university and soon dropped out to pursue music with them. The band issued its debut single, "Radio Free Europe," and subsequently signed to I.R.S. Records, meeting wide acclaim and soon great commercial success.

Possessing a distinctive voice, Stipe has been noted for the "mumbling" style of his early career. Since the mid-1980s, Stipe has sung in "wailing, keening, arching vocal figures" that R.E.M. biographer David Buckley compared to Celtic folk artists and Muslim muezzin. He was in charge of R.E.M.'s visual aspect, often selecting album artwork and directing many of the band's music videos. Outside the music industry, he owns and runs two film production studios, C-00 and Single Cell Pictures.

As a member of R.E.M., Stipe was inducted into the Rock and Roll Hall of Fame in 2007. As a singer-songwriter, Stipe influenced a wide range of artists, including Kurt Cobain of Nirvana and Thom Yorke of Radiohead. Bono of U2 has described his voice as "extraordinary", and Yorke told The Guardian that Stipe is his favorite lyricist, saying "I loved the way he would take an emotion and then take a step back from it and in doing so make it so much more powerful".

== Early life and education ==
Stipe was born on January 4, 1960, in Decatur, Georgia, to Marianne and John Stipe. He was a military brat; his father was a serviceman in the United States Army, having served in Korea as a helicopter pilot. The elder Stipe's career resulted in frequent relocations for his family. His younger sister, Lynda Stipe, was born in 1962 and became the vocalist of Hetch Hetchy. Stipe and his family moved to various locales during his childhood, including West Germany, Texas, Illinois, and Alabama. In 1978, he graduated from high school in Collinsville, Illinois, in suburban St. Louis. His senior photo is pictured in the album art work of Eponymous. Stipe also worked at the local Waffle House. Previous generations of his family were Methodist ministers.

At age 14, Stipe was turned on to punk rock by an article in Creem magazine by Lisa Robinson on the CBGB scene. The article featured a photo of Patti Smith, whom Stipe came to idolize. He remembers buying her debut album, Horses, the day it came out. "Since then, I never looked back."

== Career ==
=== Boat Of ===
In the early 1980s, Stipe played in the group Boat Of with Tom Smith, who would later found the groups Peach of Immortality and To Live and Shave in L.A.. Carol Levy and Mike Green were also in the band.

=== R.E.M. ===
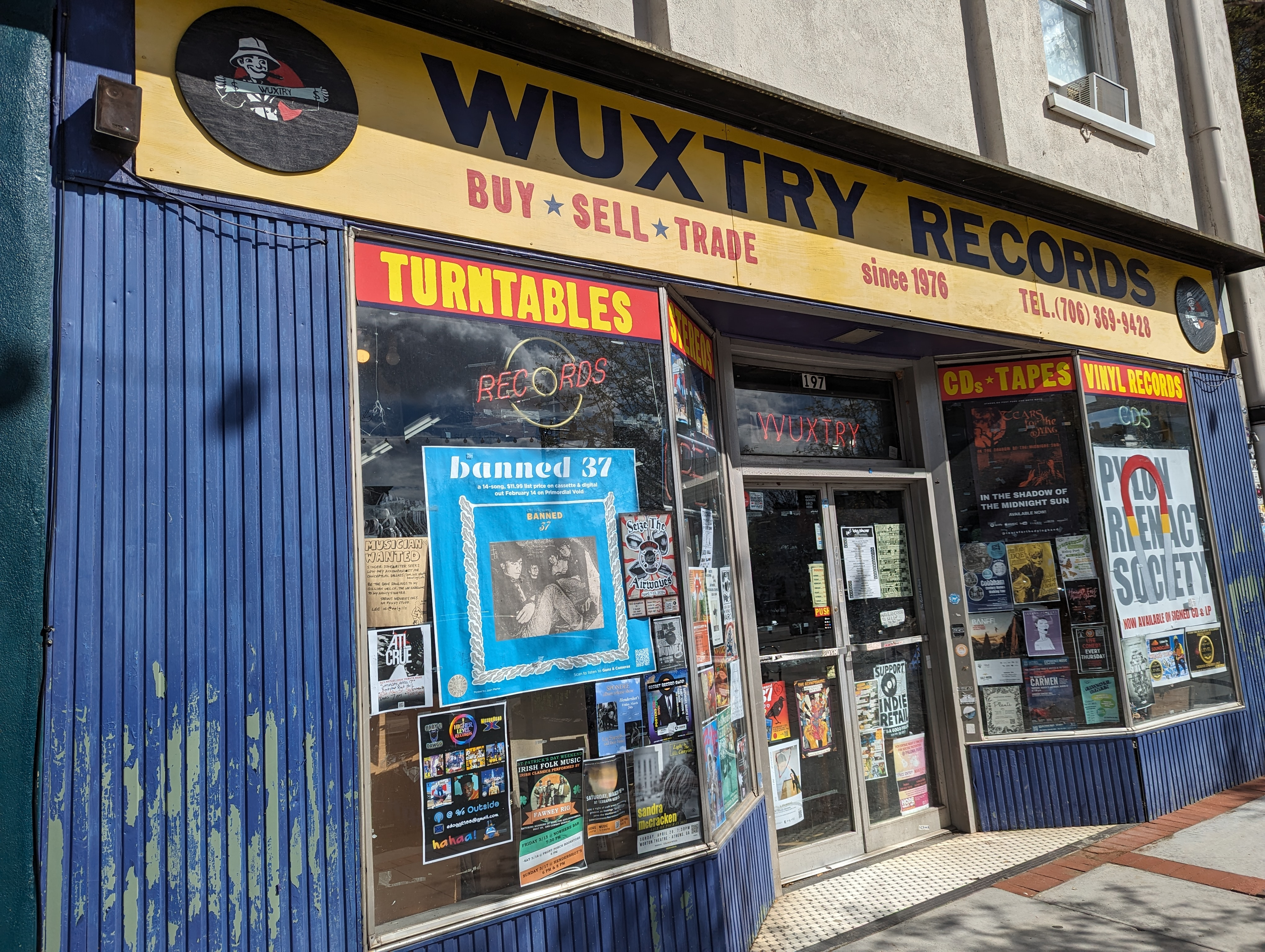
Wuxtry Records in Athens, where Stipe met guitarist Peter Buck.

While studying art at the University of Georgia in Athens, Stipe frequented the Wuxtry record shop, where he met store clerk Peter Buck in 1980. "He was a striking-looking guy and he also bought weird records, which not everyone in the store did," Buck recalled. The two became friends; they eventually decided to form a band and started writing music together, although at the time Stipe was also in a local group named Gangster. Buck and Stipe were soon joined by Bill Berry and Mike Mills, and named themselves R.E.M., a name Stipe selected at random from a dictionary. Stipe was the youngest member of the band.

All four members of R.E.M. dropped out of school in 1980 to focus on the new band. Stipe was the last to do so. The band issued its debut single, "Radio Free Europe," on Hib-Tone; it was a college radio success. The band signed to I.R.S. Records for the release of the Chronic Town EP one year later. In 1983, R.E.M. released its debut album, Murmur, which was acclaimed by critics. Stipe's vocals and lyrics received particular attention from listeners. Murmur went on to win the Rolling Stone Critics Poll Album of the Year over Michael Jackson's Thriller. Their second album, Reckoning, followed in 1984.

In 1985, R.E.M. traveled to England to record their third album, Fables of the Reconstruction, a difficult process that brought the band to the verge of a break up. After the album was released, relationships in the band remained tense. Gaining weight and acting eccentrically (such as by shaving his hair into a monk's tonsure), Stipe later identified himself as suffering from depression and exhaustion during this period, saying "I was well on my way to losing my mind."

They toured in Canada and throughout Europe that year; Stipe had bleached his hair blond during this time.

Bill Berry left R.E.M. in 1997, and the other members continued as a three-piece. R.E.M. disbanded amicably in 2011. Stipe confirmed in 2021 that they had no plans to reunite.

=== Projects ===
In September 1983, a few months after the release of R.E.M.'s debut album, Stipe participated in a low-budget, forty-five-minute Super-8 film called Just Like a Movie, shot in Athens by New York Rocker magazine photographer Laura Levine, who was a friend of the band. Those with acting roles in the film included Levine, Stipe, his sister Lynda, Matthew Sweet (who formed a short-lived duo, Community Trolls, with Michael Stipe), and R.E.M.'s Bill Berry. The film remains unreleased.

In the period between 1990 and 1992, Stipe was involved with the band Chickasaw Mudd Puppies. He co-produced and featured on their two albums: White Dirt (1990) and 8 Track Stomp (1991).

Stipe was friends with Kurt Cobain, the lead singer of Nirvana, who died in 1994. R.E.M. recorded the song "Let Me In" from the 1994 album Monster in tribute to Cobain. Stipe was chosen as the godfather of Cobain and Courtney Love's daughter, Frances Bean Cobain. In 2023, Stipe officiated Frances's wedding to Riley Hawk.

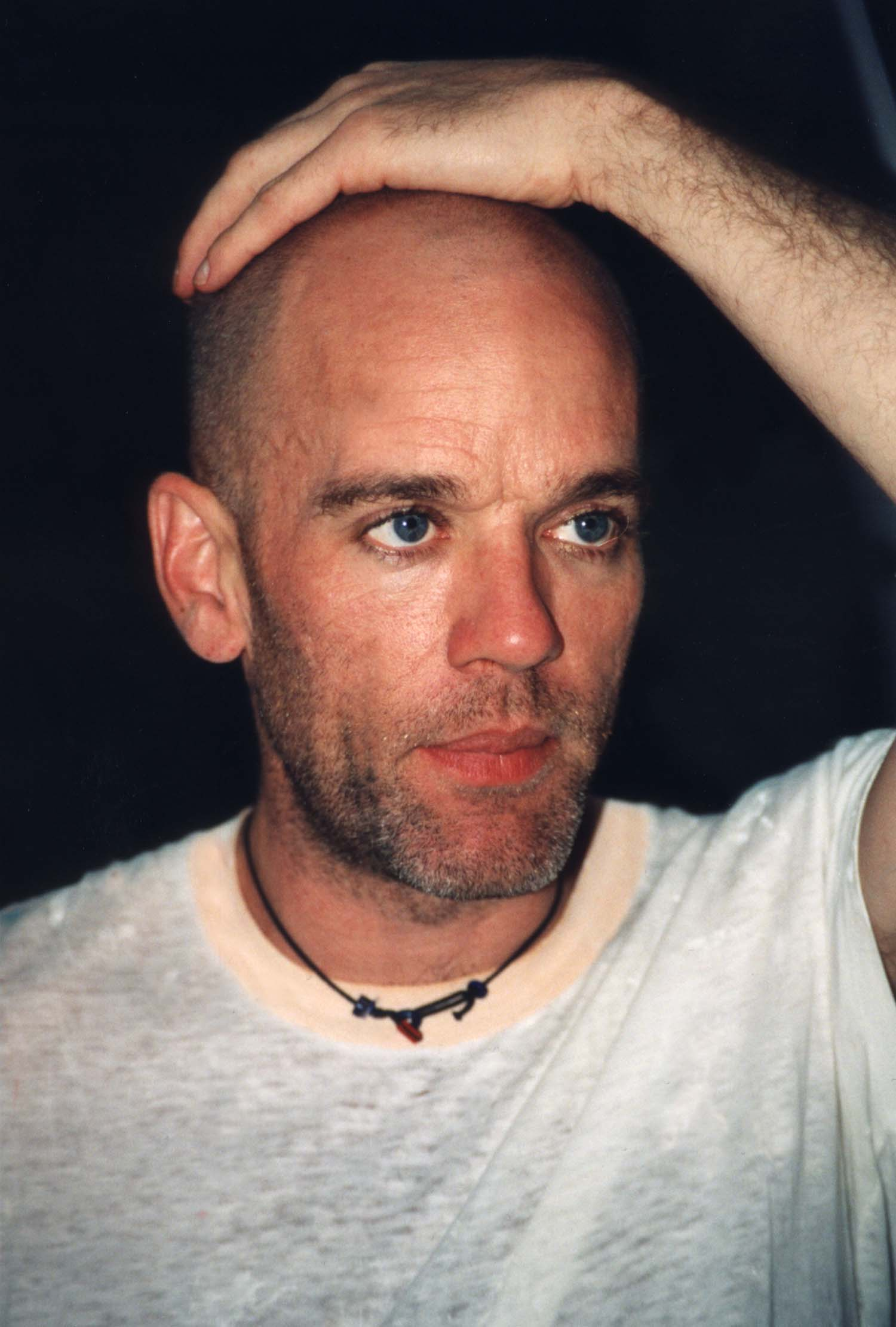
Stipe in 1998

Stipe was once very close to fellow alternative rock singer Natalie Merchant and has recorded a few songs with her, including one titled "Photograph," which appeared on a pro-choice benefit album titled Born to Choose, and they appeared live with Peter Gabriel singing Gabriel's single "Red Rain" at the 1996 VH1 Honors and a few other times.

Stipe and Tori Amos became friends in the mid-1990s and recorded a duet in 1994 called "It Might Hurt a Bit" for the Don Juan DeMarco motion picture soundtrack. Both Stipe and Amos decided not to release it.

In 1998, Stipe published a collection called Two Times Intro: On the Road with Patti Smith. In 2006, Stipe released an EP that comprised six different cover versions of Joseph Arthur's "In the Sun" for the Hurricane Katrina disaster relief fund. One version, recorded in a collaboration with Coldplay's Chris Martin, reached number one on the Canadian Singles Chart. Also in 2006, Stipe appeared on the song "Broken Promise" on the Placebo release Meds. Continuing his non-R.E.M. work in 2006, Stipe sang the song "L'Hôtel" on the tribute album to Serge Gainsbourg titled Monsieur Gainsbourg Revisited and appeared on the song "Dancing on the Lip of a Volcano" on the New York Dolls album One Day It Will Please Us to Remember Even This. He recorded a song with Miguel Bosé on the album Papito, "Lo que ves es lo que hay."

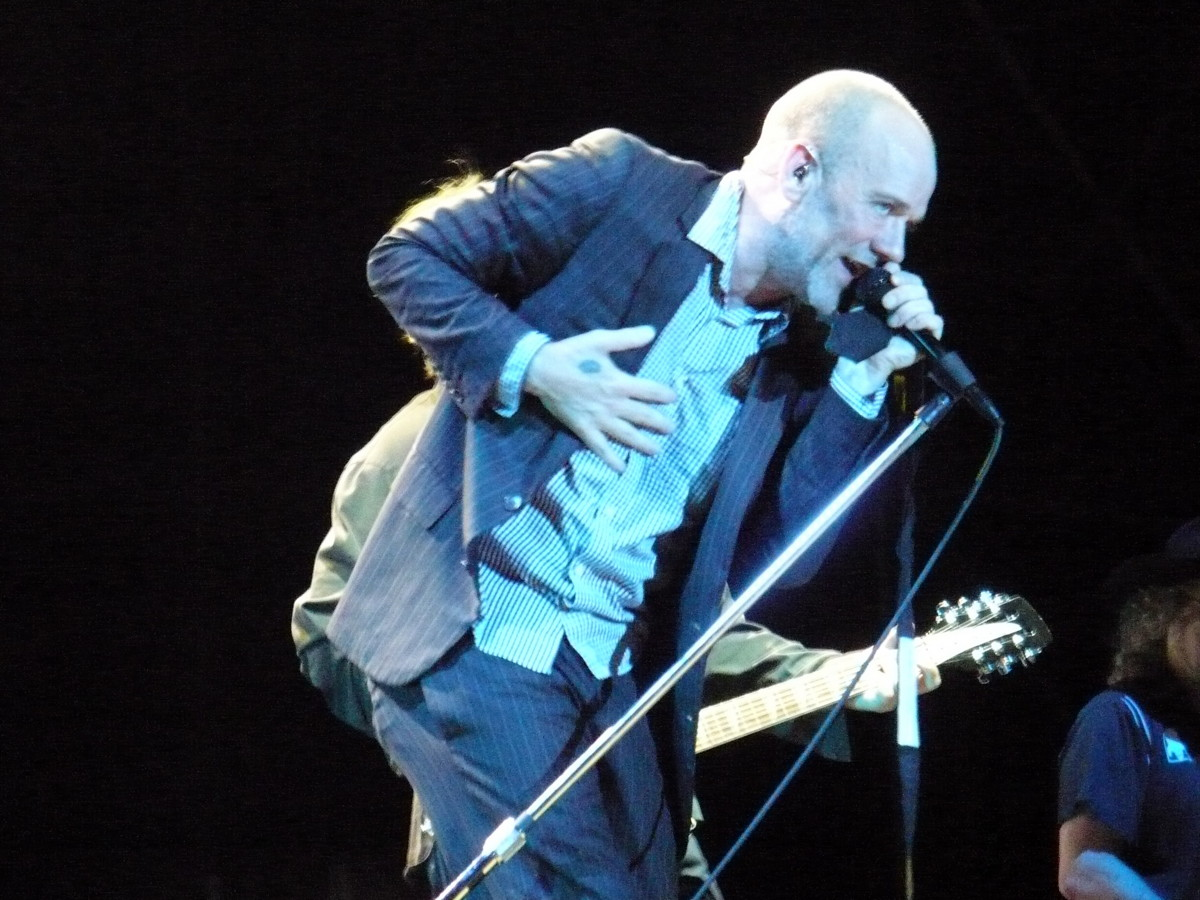
Stipe performing with R.E.M. in 2008.

Stipe collaborated with Lacoste in 2008 to release his own "holiday collector edition" brand of polo shirt. The design depicts a concert audience from the view of the performer on stage. He appeared with Chris Martin of Coldplay live at Madison Square Garden and online to perform "Losing My Religion" in the 12-12-12 concert raising money for relief from Hurricane Sandy. A new recording from Stipe and featuring Courtney Love was revealed in 2013. The song, "Rio Grande," is taken from Johnny Depp's pirate-themed album, Son of Rogue's Gallery. Stipe also created the soundtrack for The Cold Lands (2013), a film by Stipe's friend director Tom Gilroy.

Stipe inducted the American grunge band Nirvana into the Rock and Roll Hall of Fame on April 10, 2014. He debuted his first solo composition at Moogfest in 2017. In June 2017, it was revealed that Stipe had returned to recording, acting as producer and co-writer for Fischerspooner's single "Have Fun Tonight", the lead single from their album Sir. Stipe would go on to produce and co-write the entire Sir album, released on February 16, 2018. Stipe released the solo song "Future, If Future" on March 24, 2018, followed by "Your Capricious Soul" on October 5, 2019. "Drive to the Ocean" was released for his 60th birthday on January 4, 2020.

Photography has long been a passion for Stipe and he has been carrying a camera with him since his teenage years when he photographed shows featuring Ramones, The Runaways and Queen. In 2018, Stipe released a book of his photography entitled Volume 1, which featured 35 photographs of such celebrities as River Phoenix and Kurt Cobain. A second volume with Douglas Coupland, Our Interference Times: A Visual Record, was released in 2019.

In 2019, Stipe collaborated with Aaron Dessner and Justin Vernon's band Big Red Machine on the single "No Time For Love Like Now." The song was finished and released in 2020 during the COVID-19 pandemic.

Stipe began recording his first solo album at Electric Lady Studios in New York City in 2023, writing and producing "synth-infused, poppy" songs with longtime collaborator Andy LeMaster. He performed "The Rest of Ever" on The Late Show With Stephen Colbert in April 2026 in promotion of his debut solo album.

=== Film and television work ===
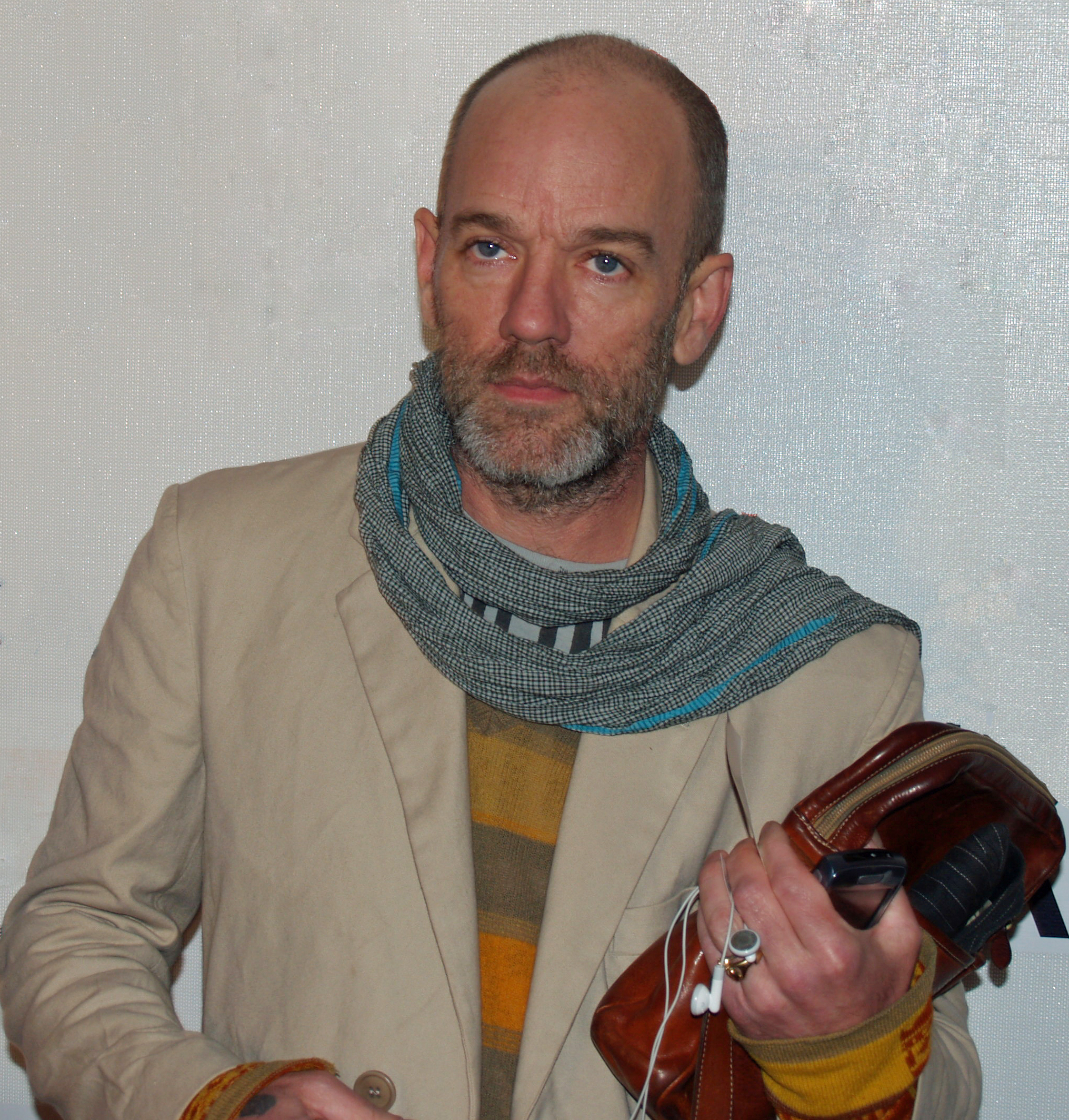
Stipe at the 2007 Tribeca Film Festival

In early 1987, Stipe and Jim McKay co-founded C-00 Films, a mixed-media company that was "designed to channel its founder's creative talents towards the creation and promotion of alternative film works." Stipe and his producing partner, Sandy Stern, have served as executive producers on films including Being John Malkovich, Velvet Goldmine, and Man on the Moon. He was also credited as a producer of the 2004 film Saved! as well as serving as a co-producer on the 1999 documentary American Movie, directed by Chris Smith. Smith has mentioned how thanks to Stipe having a hand in producing the film, he was able to get additional funding to get film stock as he followed Milwaukee filmmaker Mark Borchardt, his family and friends, including Mike Schank, while Borchardt completed his short film Coven.

In 1998, he worked on Single Cell Pictures, a film production company that released several arthouse/indie movies.

Stipe has made a number of acting appearances on film and on television. He appeared in an episode of The Adventures of Pete & Pete as an ice cream man named Captain Scrummy.

Stipe has appeared as himself with R.E.M. on Sesame Street, playing a reworked version of "Shiny Happy People" titled "Furry Happy Monsters", and appeared in an episode of The Simpsons titled "Homer the Moe", in which R.E.M. was tricked into playing a show in Homer Simpson's garage. He also appeared as a guest on the Cartoon Network talk show spoof Space Ghost Coast to Coast in the episode "Hungry". Stipe made several short appearances on The Colbert Report.

Stipe voiced Schnitzel the Reindeer in the 1999 movie Olive, the Other Reindeer and appeared in the 1996 film Color of a Brisk and Leaping Day.

=== Political activism ===
Stipe encouraging fellow residents of New York City to divest from fossil fuels in 2017

In March 2006, Stipe, along with other musicians, held a protest concert against the Iraq War. In March 2018, Stipe joined the "March for Our Lives" rallies to advocate gun control after the Marjory Stoneman Douglas High School shooting. He also released a teaser of his new song in the rally.

In a 2021 interview for Jacobin, Stipe described himself as a democratic socialist, and said that he was a member of the Democratic Party so he could vote in Democratic primaries. He endorsed Bernie Sanders' 2016 and 2020 presidential campaigns.

In October 2023, Stipe signed an open letter of artists to President Joe Biden urging a ceasefire in Gaza.

=== Philanthropy ===
In August 2022, Stipe announced a contribution of his 2018 debut solo track, "Future, If Future" to be featured on a bioplastic 12″ vinyl record to support Brian Eno's Earthpercent.

In February 2024, Stipe donated handwritten lyrics for the song "Nightswimming" to an auction benefitting Médecins Sans Frontières, also known as Doctors Without Borders, in Gaza.

In October 2025, Stipe donated signed handwritten lyrics for the song "At My Most Beautiful" for an auction benefit held by Housing Works.

== Personal life ==
Stipe is vegetarian and co-owned a vegetarian restaurant, Guaranteed, in Athens, Georgia. He lives with his long-term partner, French photographer Thomas Dozol, in New York and Berlin.

In 1983, Stipe met Natalie Merchant of the band 10,000 Maniacs; the two started a friendship, and eventually had a romantic relationship for a period of time.

With the success of the albums Out of Time (1991) and Automatic for the People (1992), R.E.M. became mainstream music stars. Around 1992, rumors that Stipe had contracted HIV began to circulate. He responded with the following:

Not that I can tell. I wore a hat that said "White House Stop AIDS." I'm skinny. I've always been skinny, except in 1985 when I looked like Marlon Brando, the last time I shaved my head. I was really sick then. Eating potatoes. I think AIDS hysteria would obviously and naturally extend to people who are media figures and anybody of indecipherable or unpronounced sexuality. Anybody who looks gaunt, for whatever reason. Anybody who is associated, for whatever reason – whether it's a hat, or the way I carry myself – as being queer-friendly.

In 1994, with questions remaining, Stipe described himself as "an equal opportunity lech," and said he did not define himself as gay, straight or bisexual, but that he was attracted to, and had relationships with, both men and women. In 1995, he appeared on the cover of Out magazine. Stipe described himself as a "queer artist" in Time in 2001 and revealed that he had been in a relationship with "an amazing man" for three years at that point. Stipe reiterated this in a 2004 interview with Butt magazine. When asked if he ever declares himself as gay, Stipe stated, "I don't. I think there's a line drawn between gay and queer, and for me, queer describes something that's more inclusive of the grey areas."

In 1999, author Douglas A. Martin published a novel, Outline of My Lover, in which the narrator has a six-year romantic relationship with the unnamed lead singer of a successful Athens, Georgia-based rock band; the book was widely speculated, and later confirmed by its author, to have been a roman à clef based on a real relationship between Martin and Stipe. The two had previously collaborated on two books, both in 1998: The Haiku Year (for which the two had both contributed haiku) and Martin's book of poetry Servicing the Salamander (for which Stipe took the cover photograph).

== Musical style ==
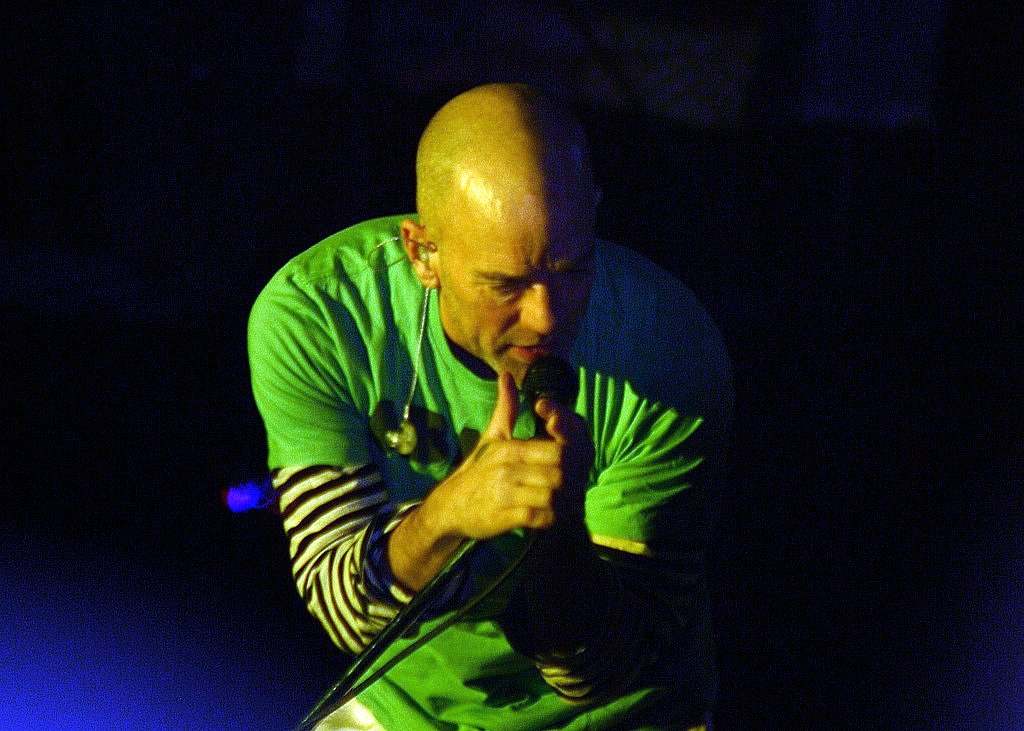
Stipe with R.E.M. performing at Langerado in 2008

Stipe has a baritone vocal range. His role in the songwriting process for R.E.M. was to write lyrics and devise melodies. While each member was given an equal vote in the songwriting process, Peter Buck has conceded that Stipe, as the band's lyricist, could rarely be persuaded to follow an idea he did not favor. Stipe sings in "wailing, keening, arching vocal figures" that R.E.M. biographer David Buckley compared to Celtic folk artists and Muslim muezzin. Stipe often harmonizes with Mills in songs; in the chorus for "Stand", Mills and Stipe alternate singing lyrics, creating a dialogue. Early articles about the band focused on Stipe's singing style (described as "mumbling" by The Washington Post), which often rendered his lyrics indecipherable. Stipe commented in 1984, "It's just the way I sing. If I tried to control it, it would be pretty false."

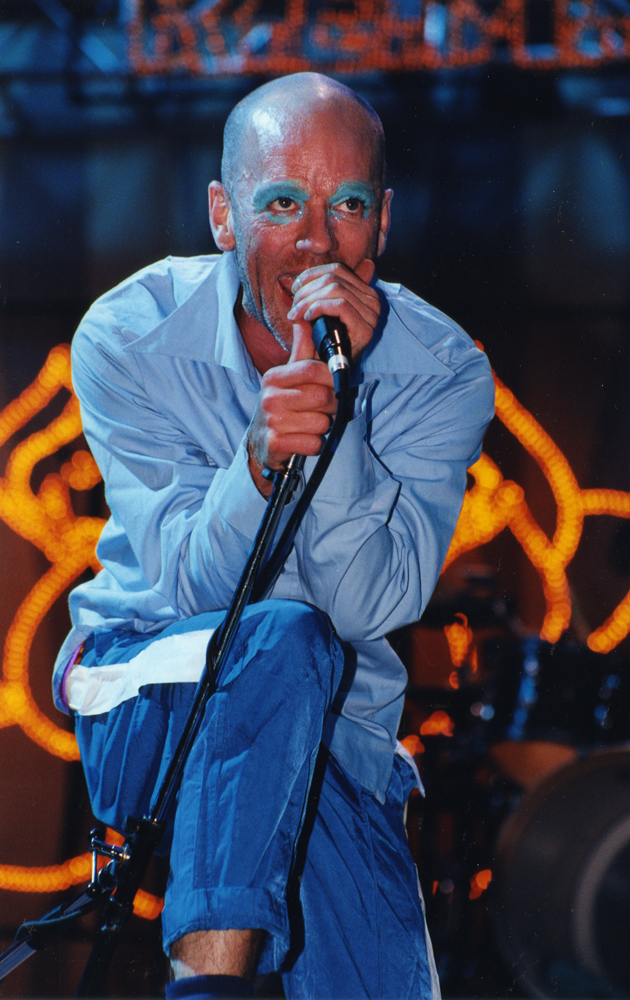
Stipe performing at the 1999 Glastonbury Festival

Stipe has earned recognition from the music industry for his unique voice. Bono remarked in 2003 that Stipe has an "extraordinary voice," adding "I often tell him I think he's a crooner, and he doesn't like that very much. But it is sort of one part some sort of Bing Crosby '50s laid-back crooner, and one part Dolly Parton." In 2023, Rolling Stone ranked Stipe at number 152 on its list of the 200 Greatest Singers of All Time.

Stipe insisted that many of his early lyrics were "nonsense," saying in a 1994 online chat, "You all know there aren't words, per se, to a lot of the early stuff. I can't even remember them." In truth, many early R.E.M. songs had definite lyrics that Stipe wrote with care. Stipe explained in 1984 that when he started writing lyrics they were like "simple pictures," but after a year he grew tired of the approach and "started experimenting with lyrics that didn't make exact linear sense, and it's just gone from there." In the mid-1980s, as Stipe's pronunciation while singing became clearer, the band decided that its lyrics should convey ideas on a more literal level. Mills explained, "After you've made three records and you've written several songs and they've gotten better and better lyrically the next step would be to have somebody question you and say, are you saying anything? And Michael had the confidence at that point to say yes...." After what Stipe has referred to as "The Dark Ages of American Politics" [The Reagan/Bush Years], R.E.M. incorporated more politically oriented concerns into his lyrics on Document and Green. "Our political activism and the content of the songs was just a reaction to where we were, and what we were surrounded by, which was just abject horror," Stipe said later. "In 1987 and '88 there was nothing to do but be active." While Stipe continued to write songs with political subject matter like "Ignoreland" and "Final Straw," later albums have focused on other topics. Automatic for the People dealt with "mortality and dying. Pretty turgid stuff," according to Stipe; Monster, meanwhile, critiqued love and mass culture, and Reveal dipped into mysticism.

== Discography ==
Solo releases

- "Arms of Love" on the compilation album In Defense of Animals Benefit Compilation (1993)
- "Full Moon" on the soundtrack album Short Cuts (1993)
- "In the Sun" (with Chris Martin) (2006)
- "Rio Grande" (with Courtney Love) on Son of Rogues Gallery: Pirate Ballads, Sea Songs & Chanteys (2013)
- "Your Capricious Soul" (2019)
- "Drive to the Ocean" (2020)
- "No Time for Love Like Now" (with Big Red Machine) (2020)
- "Sunday Morning" on I'll Be Your Mirror: A Tribute to The Velvet Underground & Nico (2021)
- "I Played the Fool" (with Andrew Watt) (2026)

Guest appearances

- With the Golden Palominos: "Boy (Go)", "Omaha" and "Clustering Train" on Visions of Excess (1985); "Alive and Living Now" on Drunk with Passion (1991)
- With Our Favorite Band: "Dreamin' of Eternity" Saturday Nights ... Sunday Mornings (1987)
- With 10,000 Maniacs: "A Campfire Song" on In My Tribe (1987); "To Sir, with Love" and "Candy Everybody Wants" on Few & Far Between EP (1993)
- With Warren Zevon: "Bad Karma" on Sentimental Hygiene (1987) (Berry, Buck, and Mills of R.E.M. served as Zevon's primary backing band on the record as well)
- With the Indigo Girls: "Kid Fears" on Indigo Girls (1989); "I'll Give You My Skin" on Rarities (2005)
- With Natalie Merchant and Mark Bingham and the Roches: "Opening Melody – Little April Shower" on Stay Awake: Various Interpretations of Music from Vintage Disney Films
- With Syd Straw: "Future 40's" on Surprise (1989)
- With the Blue Aeroplanes: "What It Is" on Swagger (1990)
- With Robyn Hitchcock: "She Doesn't Exist" on Perspex Island, and "Dark Green Energy", 'B'-side to "Ultra Unbelievable Love" (1991)
- With Billy Bragg: "You Woke Up My Neighbourhood" on Don't Try This at Home (1991)
- With KRS-One: "Civilization Vs. Technology" on the H.E.A.L. compilation Civilization vs. Technology (1991)
- With Neneh Cherry: "Trout" on Homebrew (1992)
- With Kristin Hersh: "Your Ghost" on Hips and Makers (1994)
- With Michael Brook: "Ill Wind (You're Blowing Me No Good)" on Albino Alligator (1997)
- "My Gang" on Kerouac: Kicks Joy Darkness (1997)
- With Vic Chesnutt: "Injured Bird" on The End of Violence (1997)
- With Patti Smith: "Last Call" on Peace and Noise (1997); "Glitter in Their Eyes" on Gung-Ho (2000)
- With Rain Phoenix: "Happiness" on the soundtrack for the film Happiness (1998)
- With Grant Lee Buffalo: "Everybody Needs a Little Sanctuary" on Jubilee (1998)
- With Spacehog: "Almond Kisses" on The Chinese Album (1998)
- With Utah Saints: "Sun", "Punk Club", "Rhinoceros" and "Wiggedy Wack" on Two (2000)
- With Community Trolls: "Tainted Obligation" (1983) on To Understand: The Early Recordings of Matthew Sweet (2002)
- With Artists Against AIDS Worldwide: "What's Going On" (2001)
- With Faultline: "Greenfields" on Your Love Means Everything (2002)
- With 1 Giant Leap: "The Way You Dream" on 1 Giant Leap (2002); I Have Seen Trouble on What About Me? (2009)
- With Stéphane Pompougnac: "Clumsy" on Living on the Edge (2003)
- "L'Hôtel" (Serge Gainsbourg cover) on Monsieur Gainsbourg Revisited (2006)
- With the New York Dolls: "Dancing on the Lip of a Volcano" on One Day It Will Please Us to Remember Even This (2006)
- With Placebo: "Broken Promise" on Meds (2006)
- With Miguel Bosé: "Lo que hay es lo que ves" on Papito (2007)
- With Maria Taylor: "Cartoons And Forever Plans" on LadyLuck (2009)
- "Souris nocturne" on Souris Calle (2018)
- With Rain Phoenix: "Time Is the Killer" on Time Gone (2019)
- With Mykki Blanco: "Family Ties" on Stay Close to Music (2022)

Production In addition to co-producing most of R.E.M.'s output, Stipe has also produced the following:

- Hugo Largo: "Drum" (1988), "Opal/Warner Brothers" (1988)
- Chickasaw Mudd Puppies: White Dirt (1990) and 8 Track Stomp (1991) – co-produced with Willie Dixon.
- With Vic Chesnutt: "Little" (1990), "West of Rome" (1992)
- With Magnapop: Magnapop (1992)
- With Fischerspooner: Sir (2018)

== Books ==
- Michael Stipe: Volume 1. Damiani, 2018. ISBN 9788862085915. Contains 35 photographs.
- Our Interference Times: A Visual Record. With Douglas Coupland. Damiani, 2019. ISBN 978-8862086783.
- Michael Stipe: Michael Stipe. Damiani, 2021. ISBN 9788862087384.
- Even the Birds Gave Pause. Damiani. 2023. ISBN 9788862088145.

== General references ==
- Buckley, David. R.E.M.: Fiction: An Alternative Biography. Virgin, 2002. ISBN 1-85227-927-3.
- Jovanovic, Rob (2006). Michael Stipe: The Biography. Portrait. ISBN 0-7499-5098-6.
- Platt, John, ed. The R.E.M. Companion: Two Decades of Commentary. Schirmer, 1998. ISBN 0-02-864935-4.
