= Syd Straw =

American rock singer and songwriter (born 1958)

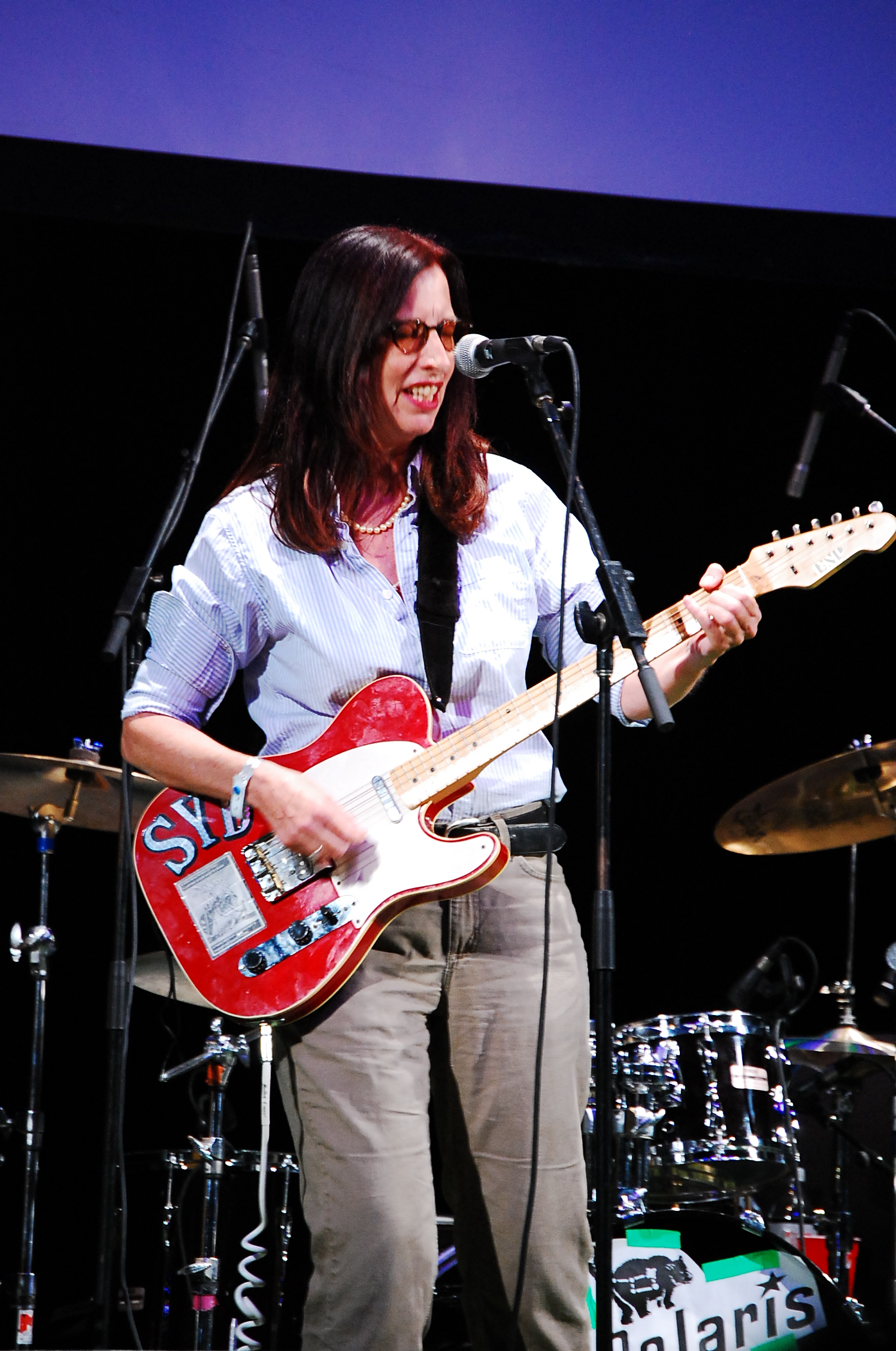
Syd Straw at the Orpheum Theatre (2012)

Syd Straw is an American rock singer and songwriter. She began her career singing backup for Pat Benatar, then took her distinctive and powerful voice to the indie/alternative scene and joined the ever-evolving line-up of Golden Palominos from 1985 through 1987, appearing on their second and third albums. She left the group in 1987 to establish her solo career.

== Career ==
Straw is the daughter of actor Jack Straw (The Pajama Game) and songwriter Barrie Jean Garvin.

She was a frequent lead singer and occasional co-songwriter for Golden Palominos, which was spearheaded by drummer Anton Fier and also featured vocal turns by Michael Stipe, Matthew Sweet, Don Dixon, Jack Bruce and others.

She appeared as a featured musical guest on many programs, including the initial episode of MTV's Unplugged, The Tonight Show with Jay Leno, and Late Night with David Letterman.

Straw in 1989 released her first solo album, Surprise, which featured contributions by Stipe, Fier, Richard Thompson, Jody Harris, Peter Blegvad, and a number of other well-known musicians. She released a second solo album, War and Peace, in 1996. Recorded with Midwest rock group The Skeletons, it chronicled a brief and unhappy romance. In 2008, she released a new album, Pink Velour, on her own label, Earnester Records. According to an earlier interview, the title track "is about my family moving back and forth between the east and the west, and my being kidnapped by my mother on Valentine's Day in 1969, and about not seeing my dad for almost seven years."

A frequent backup singer and contributor to duets with other musicians, Straw has also maintained an intermittent acting career, appearing on the television shows The Adventures of Pete & Pete and the original Tales of the City. Straw's role on The Adventures of Pete & Pete, as middle-school algebra teacher Miss Fingerwood, was introduced in the episode "Valentine's Day Massacre," and was reprised in the episodes "Hard Day's Pete" and "x=why?"

Syd Straw can be heard singing harmony and backing vocals on the Rickie Lee Jones albums Traffic from Paradise and The Evening of My Best Day. She is also featured on Leo Kottke's Peculiaroso, which Jones produced. Straw appears on "What Am I Worth" from the Dave Alvin album King of California. For a number of years she has given an annual "Heartwreck" live performance on Valentine's Day.

In 1994, Straw teamed up with Wilco to contribute the song "The T.B. Is Whipping Me" to the AIDS benefit album Red Hot + Country, produced by the Red Hot Organization. She continues to record and perform today, recently in San Francisco's legendary Hardly Strictly Bluegrass festival in September 2023.

== Discography ==
=== Albums ===
- 1989: Surprise (Virgin) – reissued in 2000 on Koch with two bonus tracks
- 1996: War and Peace (Capricorn)
- 2001: Live at the Triple Crown (TAO) with The Adventures Of...
- 2005: Whole Wide World: Uncollected Songs (self-released)
- 2008: Pink Velour (Earnester)

=== Compilation albums ===
- 1985: various artists – Luxury Condos Coming to Your Neighborhood Soon (Coyote) – track 13, "Listening To Elvis"
- 1988: various artists – Stay Awake: Various Interpretations of Music from Vintage Disney Films (A&M) – track 4(c), "Blue Shadows on the Trail"
- 1990: various artists – Rutles Highway Revisited (A Tribute to The Rutles) (Shimmy Disc) – track 1–7, "I Must Be In Love" (with Marc Ribot)
- 1992: various artists – Downtown Does The Beatles Live at the Knitting Factory 1992 (Knitting Factory) – track 10, "Don't Let Me Down" (with Arto Lindsay, Mark Ribot, Joey Baron, and Greg Cohn)
- 1993: Chris Stamey and Friends – Christmas Time (East Side Digital) – track 10, "(I'm Always Touched by Your) Presents, Dear"
- 1994: various artists – Beat the Retreat – Songs by Richard Thompson (Capitol) – track 5, "For Shame of Doing Wrong" (with Evan Dando)
- 1994: various artists – Red Hot + Country (Mercury Nashville) – track 16, "The T.B. Is Whipping Me" (with Wilco)
- 1994: various artists – A Live Christmas Extravaganza (Deko) – track 2, "X-Mas Twist"
- 1995: various artists – Live from Mountain Stage Volume 8 (Blue Plate) – track 9, "Golden Dreams"
- 1998: various artists – I WANNA BE KATE: The Songs of Kate Bush (Brown Star Records) "The Man With The Child In His Eyes"
- 1998: various artists – Real: The Tom T. Hall Project (Sire Records) – track 10: "Harper Valley PTA" (with the Skeletons)
- 2000: various artists – One Step Up / Two Steps Back: The Songs of Bruce Springsteen (Capitol) – track 12, "Meeting Across the River"
- 2001: various artists – Daddy-O Daddy! Rare Family Songs of Woody Guthrie (Rounder) – track 8, "My Daddy (Flies a Ship in the Sky)"
- 2020: various artists – I WANNA BE KATE: The Songs of Kate Bush – Remastered and Expanded (Brown Star Records) "The Man With The Child In His Eyes"

=== Appears on ===
- 1985: The Golden Palominos – Visions of Excess (Celluloid)
- 1986: Beat Rodeo – Home in the Heart of the Beat (I.R.S.)
- 1986: The Golden Palominos – Blast of Silence (Axed My Baby for a Nickel) (Celluloid)
- 1987: The dB's – The Sound of Music (I.R.S.)
- 1987: Victoria Williams – Happy Come Home (Geffen)
- 1988: Eric Ambel – Roscoe's Gang (Enigma)
- 1988: Face to Face – One Big Day (Mercury)
- 1989: Boo Hewerdine and Darden Smith – Evidence (Chrysalis)
- 1989: Mark Bingham – I Passed for Human (Dog Gone)
- 1989: Marshall Crenshaw – Good Evening (Warner Bros.)
- 1989: Van Dyke Parks – Tokyo Rose (Warner Bros.)
- 1990: Peter Blegvad – King Strut and Other Stories (Silvertone)
- 1990: Bloomsday – Fortuny (Island)
- 1990: Was (Not Was) – Are You Okay? (Fontana)
- 1990: Roy Nathanson – Little Fred (Les Disques du Crépuscule)
- 1991: Barkmarket – Vegas Throat (Def American Recordings)
- 1991: David Sanborn – Another Hand (Elektra)
- 1992: Freedy Johnston – Can You Fly (Bar/None)
- 1992: Marc Ribot – Requiem for What's His Name (Les Disques Du Crépuscule)
- 1992: Loudon Wainwright III - History (Charisma Records)
- 1993: Dave Alvin – Museum of Heart (HighTone)
- 1993: Rickie Lee Jones – Traffic from Paradise (Geffen Records)
- 1993: Vic Chesnutt – Drunk (Texas Hotel)
- 1994: Dave Alvin – King of California (HighTone)
- 1994: Doug Legacy with the Zydeco Party Band – King Cake Party (Wildcat)
- 1994: Grant McLennan – Horsebreaker Star (Atlantic / Beggars Banquet)
- 1994: Leo Kottke – Peculiaroso (Private Music)
- 1995: Tony Trischka – World Turning (Rounder)
- 1998: Richard Buckner – Since (MCA)
- 2000: John Greaves – The Caretaker (Blueprint)
- 2000: The Schramms – 100 Questions (Blue Rose)
- 2000: Christy McWilson – The Lucky One (HighTone)
- 2002: Wayne Kramer – Adult World (MuscleTone)
- 2003: Rickie Lee Jones – The Evening of My Best Day (V2)
- 2004: One Ring Zero – As Smart as We Are (Soft Slull Press/Urban Geek Records)
- 2014: Wilco – Alpha Mike Foxtrot: Rare Tracks 1994-2014 (Nonesuch)
- 2015: Bill Wells & Friends – Nursery Rhymes (Karaoke Kalk)
- 2021: Michael Hearst – Songs For Unconventional Vehicles (Urban Geek Records)

=== As composer ===
- 1990: David Halley – Stray Dog Talk (Demon) – track 9, "Dream Life" (co-written with David Halley)
