= Nicky Skopelitis =

American guitarist and composer

Nicky Skopelitis (born January 19, 1960) is an American guitarist and composer of Greek descent. He also has performed on banjo, oud, lute, keyboards and other instruments. Although Skopelitis has recorded few albums as a bandleader, he has appeared on many more recordings, often collaborating with prolific bass guitarist and producer Bill Laswell.

== Discography ==
=== As leader ===
- Next to Nothing (Venture, 1989)
- Ekstasis (Axiom, 1993)
- EKSTASIS "wake up and dream" (CyberOctave, 1998)
- Revelator (Douglas Music, 1998)

=== As sideman ===
With Ginger Baker

- Horses & Trees (Celluloid, 1986)
- No Material (ITM, 1989)
- Middle Passage (Axiom, 1990)
- Live in Munich Germany 1987 (Voiceprint, 2010)

With Afrika Bambaataa

- Frantic Situation (Tommy Boy, 1984)
- Beware (DBK, 1986)
- The Light (EMI, 1988)

With Manu Dibango

- Electric Africa (Celluloid, 1985)
- Pata Piya (Celluloid, 1985)
- Afrijazzy (Enemy, 1986)

With The Golden Palominos

- The Golden Palominos (Celluloid, 1983)
- Visions of Excess (Celluloid, 1985)
- Blast of Silence (Celluloid, 1986)
- A Dead Horse (Celluloid, 1989)
- Drunk with Passion (Venture, 1991)
- This Is How It Feels (Restless, 1993)
- Pure (Restless, 1994)
- Dead Inside (Restless, 1996)

With Herbie Hancock

- Hardrock (CBS, 1984)
- Sound-System (Columbia, 1984)
- Perfect Machine (Columbia, 1988)

With Bill Laswell

- Hear No Evil (Virgin, 1988)
- Sacred System: Chapter Two (ROIR, 1997)
- Jazzonia (Douglas Music, 1998)
- Permutation (Ion, 1998)
- Broken Vessels (Koch, 1999)
- Dub Chamber 3 (ROIR, 2000)
- Filmtracks 2000 (Tzadik, 2001)
- Bill Laswell & Material (Golden Stars, 2005)

With Material

- I'm the One (Elektra/Celluloid, 1982)
- One Down (Elektra/Celluloid, 1982)
- Seven Souls (Virgin, 1989)
- The Third Power (Axiom, 1991)
- Live in Japan (Jimco, 1993)
- Hallucination Engine (Axiom, 1994)
- The Road to the Western Lands (Mercury, 1998)

With Swans

- The Burning World (UNI, 1989)
- White Light from the Mouth of Infinity (Young God, 1991)
- The Great Annihilator (Young God, 1994)
- Forever Burned (Young God, 2003)

With others

- Arcana, Arc of the Testimony (Axiom, 1997)
- Peter Brötzmann, The März Combo Live in Wuppertal (FMP, 1993)
- Peter Brötzmann, Organized Chaos (Konnex, 2002)
- Bootsy Collins, What's Bootsy Doin'? (CBS, 1988)
- Curlew, Curlew (Landslide, 1984)
- Curlew, North America (Cuneiform, 2002)
- Deadline, Dissident (Day Eight Music, 1991)
- Aiyb Dieng, Rhythmagick (P-Vine 1995)
- Dub Syndicate, Mellow & Colly (Lion and Roots, 1998)
- Dub Syndicate, The Rasta Far I Collision: Cause of Chapter 3 (2006)
- Anton Fier, Dreamspeed & Blind Light 1992-1994 (Tzadik, 2003)
- Grand Mixer DXT, Crazy Cuts (Celluloid, 1983)
- Masabumi Kikuchi, Dreamachine (Glass House, 1992)
- Buddy Miles, Hell and Back (Rykodisc, 1994)
- Public Image Ltd, Album (Columbia, 1986)
- Akira Sakata, Silent Plankton (Japan, 1991)
- Pharoah Sanders, With a Heartbeat (Evolver, 2003)
- Julian Schnabel, Every Silver Lining Has a Cloud (Island, 1995)
- Sonny Sharrock, Faith Moves (CMP, 1991)
- Sly and Robbie, Rhythm Killers (Island, 1987)
- James Blood Ulmer, America – Do You Remember the Love? (Blue Note, 1987)
- Jah Wobble, Heaven & Earth (Island, 1995)
- Jah Wobble & Bill Laswell, Radioaxiom: A Dub Transmission (Palm, 2001)
- Yosuke Yamashita, Asian Games (Verve Forecast, 1993)
- Yothu Yindi, Freedom (Mushroom, 1993)
