= Jody Harris =

- Born: United States
- Genres: Surf rock, rock, no wave
- Occupations: Musician, songwriter
- Instrument: Electric guitar
- Years active: 1973–1990
- Labels: ZE; Don't Fall Off the Mountain; Press; Shanachie; Antilles; Infidelity; Lust/Unlust; Celluloid

Jody Harris is an American guitarist, singer, songwriter and composer who was born in Kansas and became a central figure in the seminal no wave scene in New York City in the 1970s.

== Career history ==
Harris was lead guitarist in the Contortions, an influential no wave band. He was also a key member of a number of bands that emerged from the no wave scene, including the Raybeats and the Golden Palominos.

Harris has also recorded as a solo artist and with guitarist Robert Quine. In 1977, he joined Quine in a band backing rock critic Lester Bangs on the 7-inch single, Let It Blurt, produced by John Cale. He was also briefly a member of the Voidoids and played on many recordings by a wide range of artists, including Matthew Sweet, Syd Straw, Kip Hanrahan and John Zorn.

With Quine, he composed all the music on their collaborative album, Escape, as well as co-writing virtually all the Raybeats' material. He also composed all the songs and instrumentals on his one solo album, except for one song co-written with Don Christensen. As part of Anton Fier's supergroup the Golden Palominos, he co-wrote the majority of the songs on the band's acclaimed second album, Visions of Excess.

== Critical appraisals ==
One critic described Harris as a "seasoned campaigner from the late-1970s flowering of American post-punk", while another called him "one of the most underrated guitarists" on the New York scene.

Robert Palmer, writing in The New York Times in 1987, praised "the luminous clarity" of Harris's lead guitar work for the Golden Palominos, while the Village Voice's Robert Christgau obliquely criticized what he called a "weakness for the genre exercise". Quine himself, however, declared Harris's work "tragically underrated -- he's so far advanced, way past me and people can't hear it".

== Discography ==
=== The Contortions ===
- No New York (Antilles 1978)
- Buy (1979)
- Paris 1980 Live Aux Bains Douches (1980)
- Live in New York (1981)
- NY No Wave (ZE 2003)

=== The Raybeats ===
- Start Swimming (Stiff 1981) (live compilation)
- Roping Wild Bears (Don't Fall Off the Mountain 1981)
- Guitar Beat (PVC/Passport 1981)
- It's Only A Movie! (Shanachie 1983)
- Children of Nuggets: Original Artyfacts from the Second Psychedelic Era, 1976-1995 (Rhino 2005)

=== Solo ===
- It Happened One Night (Press 1982)
- "Mr Control" (Tellus #1) (1983)

=== Jody Harris & Robert Quine ===
- Escape (Infidelity \ Lust/Unlust Music 1981)
- Come Together: Guitar Tribute to the Beatles, Vol. 2 (NYC 1995) (compilation)

=== The Golden Palominos ===
- Visions of Excess (Celluloid 1985)
- Blast of Silence (Celluloid 1986)

=== Richard Hell and the Voidoids ===
- Funhunt (ROIR / Important 1989)

=== Other artists ===
- Let It Blurt – Lester Bangs (SPY 1977)
- Off White – James White & The Blacks (ZE 1979)
- Press Color – Lizzy Mercier Descloux (ZE 1979)
- Stop Vicious Cycles – Jill Kroesen (Vital 1982)
- Desire Develops an Edge – Kip Hanrahan (American Clavé)
- The Big Gundown – John Zorn (Nonesuch 1986)
- Inside – Matthew Sweet (Columbia 1986)
- Surprise – Syd Straw (1989)
- What Baby? – Canine Tricycle Bereavement (1990)
- The Trouble Tree – Freedy Johnston (Bar/None 1990)
- Music for Films (Tzadik)
