= The Golden Palominos =

American band

- Origin: Cleveland, Ohio, US
- Genres: Alternative rock, experimental, ambient, country, industrial
- Years active: 1981–1996, 2010, 2012
- Labels: Celluloid, Nation/Charisma, Restless, Almost Loaded
- Past members: Anton Fier; Bill Laswell; Nicky Skopelitis; Amanda Kramer; Lori Carson; Knox Chandler; Arto Lindsay; Jody Harris; Syd Straw; Peter Blegvad; Lydia Kavanagh; Nicole Blackman; Andy Hess; Tony Scherr; David Moss; Bernie Worrell; Michael Hampton; Fred Frith

The Golden Palominos were an American musical group headed by drummer, producer, arranger, and composer Anton Fier, first formed in 1981. Aside from Fier, the Palominos membership fluctuated, with only bassist Bill Laswell and guitarist Nicky Skopelitis appearing on every album through 1996. Their final work, 2012's A Good Country Mile features vocalist Kevn Kinney. The band's early work developed out of the No Wave scene, but later branched out into alternative rock, country rock and electronic music.

While the Palominos' records usually featured a core set of musicians and a certain emotional continuity throughout the bulk of an album, various guest appearances resulted in stylistic changes from track to track. Fier stated that he thought of himself as a casting director, elaborating: "Each record was an experiment and some lasted for two records, never longer than that. I chalk it up to my short attention span and the fact that there were lots of people I wanted to work with and ways to explore areas of music I was interested in, and certain combos wouldn't fit with others, so one record would be this and another record would be something else."

== History ==
=== Initial lineup ===
The group first featured Fier, singer-guitarist Arto Lindsay, saxophonist John Zorn, bass guitarist Bill Laswell and violinist/guitarist Fred Frith. Their self-titled debut album was released on New York's Celluloid Records in 1983, and featured guest appearances by bassist Jamaaladeen Tacuma, guitarist Nicky Skopelitis, percussionist David Moss, turntablist M.E. Miller and others. The album has some of the first recorded turntable scratching outside of rap music, courtesy of Laswell and M.E. Miller. M.E. Miller also used vocal splitting technique to create harmony on the song he sings.

They were heavily influenced by so-called no wave music (Arto Lindsay had played in the seminal no-wave band DNA), but their music also contained elements of funk and of the improvisational jazz stylings that became Zorn's trademark. This line-up lasted only for the first record, although all of the core members apart from Zorn were guests on subsequent Palominos recordings.

=== 1985–1989 ===
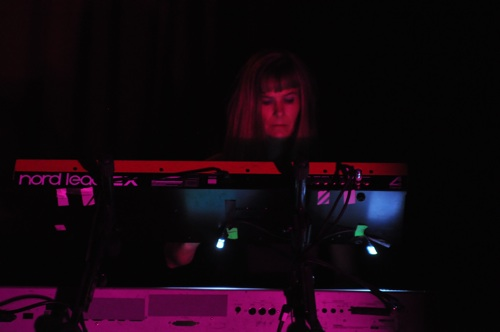
Amanda Kramer – Former Golden Palominos singer in Concert in 2009

The Palominos' next album, 1985's Visions of Excess, sounded vastly different. Of the band members that were on the first album, only Fier, Laswell and Arto Lindsay remained. Visions of Excess also marked the debut of singer Syd Straw, whose songwriting and vocals were featured prominently, as well as on the group's next album. Michael Stipe, John Lydon and Jack Bruce took turns on lead vocals, while Richard Thompson and Jody Harris were featured on lead guitar.

Blast of Silence (Axed My Baby for a Nickel) was released the following year, continuing in much the same vein as Visions of Excess and with appearances by many of the same personnel. It included covers of two songs written by Little Feat's Lowell George, both sung by Syd Straw. The record also featured prominent guest appearances by Peter Blegvad, Matthew Sweet, Don Dixon, Peter Holsapple and T-Bone Burnett.

A Dead Horse (1989) carried on in the sound of its predecessors slightly, but some of the songs crossed into a darker, more ambient and ethereal sound that dominated the Palomino records of the 1990s. Syd Straw had moved on and was no longer in the band, with most of the vocals now handled by Amanda Kramer, formerly of the dance music group Information Society. Fier later was a guest on Straw's first solo record, Surprise.

=== 1990–1995 ===
Drunk with Passion (1991) marked the first album not on Celluloid Records, taking cues from some of the darker sounds heard on A Dead Horse and using more processed and electronic sounds, giving some of its songs an ethereal feel. This album is arguably more influenced by its guest appearances than are any of the previous albums. Guests included Hüsker Dü's Bob Mould (who formed the band Sugar the following year), Richard Thompson, and Michael Stipe. Nicky Skopelitis also became more of a cornerstone of the band, contributing to the bulk of Drunk with Passion's songs along with Fier and Kramer. In 1992, Fier released his first solo record, Dreamspeed, which is partially a reworking of the Palomino's next album, This Is How It Feels.

This Is How It Feels, released on Restless Records in 1993, continued the ambient sound of Drunk with Passion, but also incorporated elements of club and trance music. It also marked the introduction of new lead vocalist Lori Carson, who co-wrote nine of the CD's tracks with Anton Fier. Bill Laswell also returned to contribute on this record, and his production work on this and on the following record, Pure, heavily influenced Laswell's own remix work of the late 1990s, as seen on the CDs Emerald Ather and City of Light. The album also contains the first cover song since Blast of Silence, an ethereal, drum-machine-laced re-interpretation of Jackson Browne's "These Days". To further highlight the album's dance elements, an EP of remixes of songs from This Is How It Feels, entitled Prison of the Rhythm, was released shortly after the CD's release.

Pure, released a year later, is seen by many as the band's most focused work, owing much to the strong contributions once again of Carson, Laswell, and Skopelitis. Tracks such as "No Skin" and "Pure" continue in the dance/ambient style of the previous album. The CD also stirred a minor controversy over the bare female breast on its cover, with some stores carrying a version of the CD with a booklet and the cover replaced by simple, text-based artwork. Another remix EP (No Thought, No Breath, No Eyes, No Heart) accompanied Pure's release.

Pure was also the last Palominos record for Lori Carson. However, the song "Little Suicides", from Pure showed the same sparse sound, production, and strong yet quiet vocals (albeit less electronic) that influenced Carson's solo work. Anton Fier produced Carson's 1995 solo record, Where It Goes.

1994 also saw the release of what was essentially Fier's second solo recording, Absence of Time (released under the moniker Blind Light), which used outtakes from Pure for much of its framework.

=== 1995–2000 ===
Dead Inside (1996) was another stylistic turnaround for the Palominos, and their last proper album. This record had a deathly, industrial sound, with the line-up consisting only of Fier, multi-instrumentalist Knox Chandler (who before joining the Palominos, was also in a band with Lori Carson), Nicky Skopelitis, and poet Nicole Blackman. Blackman's dark and deliberate lyrics (tellingly, Blackman had also recently worked with the industrial German band KMFDM) made Dead Inside a challenging record; its sound and tone stand out as decidedly unlike any of the others. The album's opener is a brutal, spoken-word track, "Victim", which details a woman's thoughts as she is abducted and eventually murdered by her kidnapper.

In 1997, The Palominos released another EP, named Dead Outside, composed of five remixes of tracks from Dead Inside. The EP, in a novelty for its time, was released as free MP3s on the Internet, made available via Nicole Blackman's website and through a fan-created band appreciation website (since decommissioned). The EP consisted of five remixes, each released sequentially for download from the sites for one month only, as per Fier's instructions:

1. Victim: The Last Thing by Sean Beavan (whose credits include 8MM, Nine Inch Nails, and Marilyn Manson) with John Van Eaton
2. Ride: Pragmatic Spasmatic by Raymond Watts (of KMFDM & Pig)
3. Belfast: Empty as Wire by Scanner (a frequent Blackman collaborator)
4. Ride remixed by Mark Walk (of Ruby)
5. Victim: Interference by John Van Eaton (another Blackman collaborator who also worked with NiN for 10 years)

Fier brought the Golden Palominos to an end after the release of Dead Inside, as he was unhappy with Restless Records and struggling with a drinking problem.

=== 2000–2012 ===
Both Syd Straw and Lori Carson have gone on to moderately successful and critically acclaimed solo careers, with Carson a frequent contributor to television shows and movies. A compilation of some of Carson's contributed songs, titled Stolen Beauty, was released by Rykodisc in 2003, and her last solo record, The Finest Thing, was released in 2004.

Anton Fier reappeared on the music scene in 2009, producing Drivin' 'n' Cryin's album The Great American Bubble Factory, which was the band's first album in 12 years.

In 2010, the Golden Palominos played two shows in New York City: a May 7 show at Le Poisson Rouge and a May 11 show at The Living Room. Both shows were an unqualified success and speculation began as to if more dates or a re-formation of the band was in the future.

At around the same time, Fier began drumming again in New York City as a sideman to his friend Tony Scherr, and Kevn Kinney, the lead singer of Drivin' 'n' Cryin', re-connected with Fier at these shows.

Fier and Kinney rekindled their friendship and began rehearsing together again, which then progressed into starting a Kickstarter campaign to fund a new Kevin Kinney album. The album, A Good Country Mile, was released on February 21, 2012, and is billed as 'Kevn Kinney and The Golden Palominos' (composed of Fier on drums, Scherr on guitars, and Andy Hess, formerly of Gov't Mule, on bass as well as Aaron Lee Tasjan on guitars and backing vocals). Initial reviews of the album were positive with Jambands stating the "...resulting music is raw and lovely and real as hell." While this represents the first music from the Palominos in nearly 15 years, any additional projects exclusively under the Golden Palominos moniker have not materialized.

Anton Fier died on September 22, 2022, at the age of 66.

== Discography ==
Studio albums

- The Golden Palominos (1983)
- Visions of Excess (1985)
- Blast of Silence (Axed My Baby for a Nickel) (1986)
- A Dead Horse (1989)
- Drunk with Passion (1991)
- This Is How It Feels (1993)
- Pure (1994)
- Dead Inside (1996)
- A Good Country Mile (2012)

=== Compilations ===
Much of the Golden Palominos' work has become increasingly hard to find, and compilations do not provide a complete overview of their work. A few best-of compilations are available: two A History collections on Celluloid both released in 1992; a German collection released in 1997; and 2002's collection Run Pony Run. However, none include any material from Drunk with Passion onward. The later albums on Restless are growing harder to find on CD, with the earliest CDs on Celluloid and Drunk with Passion being nearly non-existent. (Dreamspeed is also extremely rare in its original release and is a prized possession of Fier aficionados. However, Fier re-released it and his other solo record, Absence of Time, on John Zorn's Tzadik label in late 2003.)
