= Amanda Kramer =

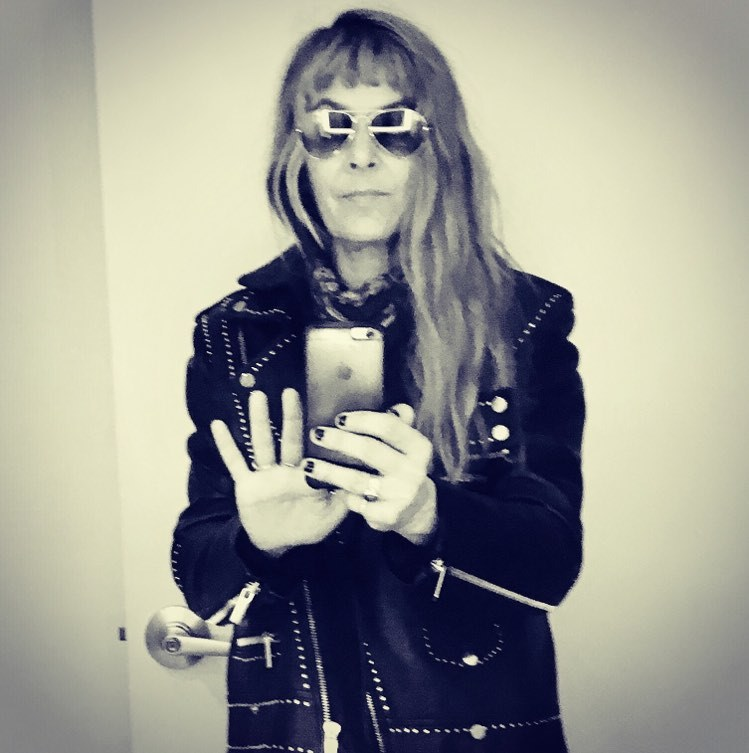
- Kramer in 2020

Background information
- Born: New York City, U.S.
- Genres: Alternative rock; experimental; synth-pop; new wave; ambient
- Occupations: Musician; singer; songwriter; composer
- Instruments: Vocals; synthesizer; keyboards
- Years active: 1986–present
- Member of: The Psychedelic Furs
- Formerly of: Information Society
- Website: amanda-kramer.com

Amanda Kramer is a United Kingdom-based American composer and touring musician. Kramer first gained prominence as a member of the techno-pop band Information Society and later performed with other alternative rock and new wave groups such as 10,000 Maniacs, World Party, and the Golden Palominos. She has been the keyboardist for the Psychedelic Furs since 2002 and she played with Siouxsie in 2007-08.

== Background and family ==
Her parents were Beverly Dennis and Russell Dennis, both of whom were actors throughout the 1950s. Beverly Dennis was cast in supporting roles in several Hollywood features, including William A. Wellman's classic 1951 proto-feminist western Westward the Women and Jean Negulesco's drama Take Care of My Little Girl (1951), and appeared regularly on the CBS (and later NBC) variety hour The Red Buttons Show (1952–1955). Russell Dennis gained minor roles in William Castle's mystery drama Hollywood Story (1951) and Mark Robson's romantic war picture Bright Victory (1951). In the 1950s both Beverly and Russell were blacklisted from mainstream Hollywood productions due to suspected Communist or Soviet affiliations. In response they soon sought out alternative careers in psychiatry and medicine, respectively.

== Solo career ==
Kramer has released four solo albums, incorporating the genres of world music, classical, experimental, jazz, and ambient: Wintermass (with Blake Leyh, 1994), Samsara (1998), Fallen Light Renew (2004) and Under the Sea (2011). The latter two albums were inspired by the poetry of William Blake and T. S. Eliot, respectively, and feature contributions from Karl Wallinger and Julee Cruise, amongst others.

== Film and television composition ==
Kramer has also composed for film and television. Her work can be heard on the Discovery Channel series Globe Trekker (later Pilot Guides), and has been featured on various television programs, including the PBS documentary Cayutaville (1998) and ABC's 20/20 (1997), as well as in the feature film True Crime (1996).

== Education ==
- 2010: University of California, Los Angeles, California; course in harmonic principles in tonal and atonal music.
- 2001–2002: University of Bristol, Bristol; master's diploma in composition for film, television and theater.
- 1998–2000: The New School, New York City, New York; Bachelor of Arts degree, emphasis in music.
- 1998–1999: Morley College, London; orchestral conducting with Lawrence Leonard.
- 1996–1997: Mannes School of Music, extension, New York; mediaeval notation, orchestration.
- 1995: One year Indian classical music study with David Hykes, New York.
- 1989–1991: Juilliard School, extension, New York; music theory and analysis with Samuel Zyman.
- 1985–1986: School of the Museum of Fine Arts, Boston, Massachusetts; electronic music and video production.
- 1983: San Francisco Conservatory of Music, California; harpsichord with Laurette Goldberg.
- 1980–1983: University of California, Santa Cruz, California; music major, piano with Lena-Liis Kiesel, voice with Paul Hilliard, harpsichord with Linda Burman-Hall.
- 1975–1977: Manhattan School of Music Preparatory Division, New York; piano with Sonia Vargas.
