= Anton Fier =

American rock drummer (1956–2022)

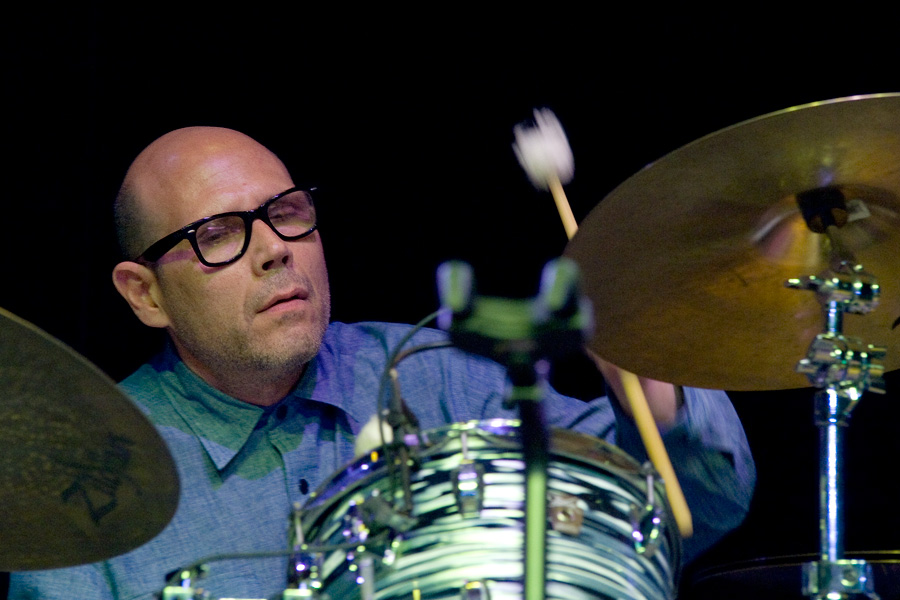
- Fier in 2011

Background information
- Born: John Anton Fier III; June 20, 1956; Cleveland, Ohio, U.S.
- Died: September 14, 2022 (aged 66) Basel, Switzerland
- Genres: Experimental rock; jazz; alternative rock
- Occupations: Musician; composer; bandleader
- Instrument: Drums
- Labels: Tzadik; Avant; Island
- Formerly of: The Lounge Lizards, The Feelies, Pere Ubu, The Golden Palominos, Swans

John Anton Fier III (June 20, 1956 – September 14, 2022) was an American drummer, producer, composer, and bandleader. He led The Golden Palominos, an experimental rock group active from 1981 to 2010.

== Family ==
Fier, known as Tony, was born in Cleveland, Ohio, to Ruthe Marie Fier and Anton J. Fier Jr., a former Marine and electrician. His parents separated when he was young and he lived with his stepfather, a polka musician.

== Career ==
In the mid-late-1970s Fier worked in a record store, began drumming, and contributed to recordings by The Styrenes and Pere Ubu, which he joined in 1977 and left in 1978 when he moved to New York City. The 1978 Pere Ubu EP titled Datapanik in the Year Zero was dedicated to Fier, who doesn't play on it.

In New York City, he got a job at SoHo Music Gallery where he had the chance to talk with musicians. Answering an ad in the Village Voice, he became a member of The Feelies in 1978, playing drums on their critically acclaimed debut album Crazy Rhythms.

From June 1981 through February 1982 Fier re-joined Pere Ubu, replacing original drummer Scott Krauss. He played drums, piano, marimba and other percussion on their fifth album, Song of the Bailing Man.

Around that time, he was in The Lodge (with John Greaves) and played in the first line-up of The Lounge Lizards, appearing on their 1981 debut album. Later that year, Fier founded The Golden Palominos, which initially featured Arto Lindsay, John Zorn, Bill Laswell and Fred Frith but later became a loose collective of musicians Fier was working with at the moment.

In the mid 1980s, he was briefly a member of Richard Hell and the Voidoids. He was also a member of Swans, appearing on their 1991 album, White Light from the Mouth of Infinity.

Fier collaborated extensively with Bill Laswell, Arto Lindsay, and Rhys Chatham. He also toured and recorded with Bob Mould from Hüsker Dü and played with bassist Jack Bruce and Japanese guitarist Kenji Suzuki on the 1987 album Inazuma Super Session – "Absolute Live!!"

Fier played on the John Zorn-led album Locus Solus in 1983. 20 years later, Fier, Zorn and Lindsay recorded a live album for Zorn's 50th birthday celebration: 50th Birthday Celebration Volume 3 of the 50th birthday series on Tzadik Records. In 1984, he played on Laurie Anderson's Mister Heartbreak.

Fier also contributed to records from the Electric Eels, Yoko Ono, Mick Jagger, Material, Herbie Hancock, Gil Scott-Heron, Peter Blegvad, Matthew Sweet, Stina Nordenstam, Lloyd Cole, Los Lobos, David Cunningham, Joe Henry, Afrika Bambaataa, and Jeff Buckley.

Fier produced several albums, such as the 1988 album of Drivin' n Cryin' Whisper Tames the Lion, a 2009 album by guitar virtuoso Jim Campilongo titled Orange, and Lianne Smith's Two Sides of a River, on which Fier also played drums.

== Personal life ==
Fier was briefly romantically involved with his Golden Palominos bandmate Lori Carson in the 1990s.

== Death ==
Syd Straw, a member of the Golden Palominos, posted on Facebook on October 11, 2019, that Fier was no longer playing drums.

Fier died on September 14, 2022, at the age of 66, at the Pegasos Clinic, in Basel, Switzerland, of VAD (Voluntary Assisted Dying) or assisted suicide. According to Exit International director Philip Nitschke, Fier was not suffering from terminal illness, but "wanted to die on his own terms after feeling he had accomplished everything he could in life." Golden Palominos guitarist Nicky Skopelitis was Fier's friend and the executor of his estate. Fier's cremated remains were delivered to Skopelitis along with a cremation notice, indicating the date of death as September 14, 2022. As noted in The Independent, Fier reportedly had left a final letter, in which he wrote "My father died at 42, and my mother at 52. I never expected or prepared myself to live this long and had no example of how to properly do so." Fier's friends reported the musician had money troubles and injuries which hampered his drumming, and had discussed the possibility of ending his life for several years.

In November 2022, two months later, the Feelies performed a tribute concert for Fier.

== Partial discography ==
- Dreamspeed (Avant, 1993)
- Every Silver Lining Has a Cloud (Island, 1995)
- Dreamspeed/Blindlight 1992–1994 (Tzadik 2003)
