= Widowspeak (Lydia Lunch album) =

Compilation album by Lydia Lunch
- Released: 1998
- Recorded: 1979–1998
- Genre: Post-punk
- Length: 89:00
- Label: New Millennium Communications (NMC)

Lydia Lunch chronology
Matrikamantra (1997)	Widowspeak (1998)	Smoke in the Shadows (2004)

Professional ratings
Review scores
Source	Rating
Allmusic	4/5 stars

Widowspeak is a compilation album by the singer Lydia Lunch, released in 1998 through New Millennium Communications (NMC).

== Track listing ==
Disc one
No.	Title	Writer(s)	Original release	Length
1.	"Death Valley '69" (with Sonic Youth)	Lydia Lunch, Thurston Moore	Bad Moon Rising	5:10
2.	"Endless Fall" (with Rowland S. Howard)	Rowland S. Howard, Lydia Lunch	Shotgun Wedding	3:45
3.	"Why Don't We Do It in the Road?"	Lennon–McCartney	Don't Fear the Reaper	3:32
4.	"Some Velvet Morning" (with Rowland S. Howard)	Lee Hazlewood	Some Velvet Morning	4:26
5.	"Four Cornered Room"	Lydia Lunch	previously unreleased	3:22
6.	"Suicide Ocean" (with Karl Blake)	Lydia Lunch	Fear Engine II	5:13
7.	"No Excuse" (with Lee Ranaldo)	Lydia Lunch	previously unreleased	3:01
8.	"A Short History of Decay, Pts. 1 & 2" (with J.F. Coleman & Joseph Budenholzer)	Joseph Budenholzer, Jim Coleman, Lydia Lunch	previously unreleased	2:28
9.	"Escape" (with Joseph Budenholzer)	Joseph Budenholzer, Lydia Lunch	Matrikamantra	1:52
10.	"A Quiet Night of Murder in Greenwich, Connecticut"	Lucy Hamilton, Lydia Lunch	The Drowning of Lucy Hamilton	3:29
11.	"The Need to Feed" (with Joseph Budenholzer)	Joseph Budenholzer, Lydia Lunch	Matrikamantra	3:50
12.	"Der Karibische Western" (with Die Haut)	Christoph Dreher, Martin Peter	Hysterie	5:30

Disc two
No.	Title	Writer(s)	Original release	Length
1.	"Twisted" (with Clint Ruin)	Lydia Lunch, Clint Ruin	7" single on Insipid	4:22
2.	"Past Glas" (with Clint Ruin)	Lydia Lunch, Clint Ruin	7" single on Insipid	4:32
3.	"Done Dun" (with Rowland S. Howard)	Lydia Lunch, Murray Mitchell	Honeymoon in Red	4:28
4.	"Lock Your Door" (with 13.13)	Lydia Lunch	13.13	5:26
5.	"Diddy Wah Diddy" (with 8 Eyed Spy)	Bo Diddley, Willie Dixon	Hysterie	2:19
6.	"Run Through the Jungle" (with 8 Eyed Spy)	John Fogerty	Hysterie	5:31
7.	"Orphans" (with Teenage Jesus and the Jerks)	Lydia Lunch	Hysterie	2:26
8.	"Son of Stink" (with Clint Ruin)	Lydia Lunch, Clint Ruin	Stinkfist	3:46
9.	"Still Burning" (with Thurston Moore)	Rowland S. Howard	In Limbo	6:03
10.	"Tornado Warnings" (with Beirut Slump)	Lydia Lunch	Hysterie	1:18
11.	"Lady Scarface"	Lydia Lunch	Queen of Siam	3:11
