= Heart of Darkness (EP) =

EP by No Trend and Lydia Lunch
- Released: 1985
- Genre: No wave, jazz rock
- Length: 17:01
- Label: Widowspeak
- Producer: Don Zientara, No Trend

No Trend chronology
Too Many Humans..... (1984)	Heart of Darkness (1985)	A Dozen Dead Roses (1988)

Lydia Lunch chronology
The Drowning of Lucy Hamilton (1985)	Heart of Darkness (1985)	Hysterie (1986)

Heart of Darkness is an extended play by no wave musicians No Trend and Lydia Lunch, released as a 10" vinyl in 1985 through Lunch's own Windowspeak label. The record includes four tracks that would all later appear on No Trend's sophomore studio album A Dozen Dead Roses, which shows a significant change in sound compared to the band's previous releases.

== Track listing ==
All lyrics and music written by No Trend

Side One
No.	Title	Length
1.	"Your Love"	5:40
2.	"Tear You Apart"	2:36

Side Two
No.	Title	Length
3.	"The Curse"	3:58
4.	"Who's To Say?"	4:47

== Personnel ==
=== Performers ===
- Jeff Mentges - Vocals, lyrics, layout (Credited as Jefferson Scott)
- Lydia Lunch - Vocals
- Dean Evangelista - Guitar
- Robert "Smokeman" Marymont - Bass
- Benard Demassy - Saxophone
- Danny "Spidako" Demetro - Keyboards
- Kenn Rudd - Drums

=== Production ===
- Don Zientara - Recording, mixing
- Richard Bangham - Graphics, photography
