= Everything (Teenage Jesus and the Jerks album) =

Compilation album by Teenage Jesus and the Jerks
- Released: July 18, 1995
- Recorded: 1977–1979
- Genre: No wave
- Length: 18:45
- Label: Atavistic

Teenage Jesus and the Jerks chronology
Pre Teenage Jesus and the Jerks (1979)	Everything (1995)	Shut Up and Bleed (2008)

Professional ratings
Review scores
Source	Rating
Allmusic	3/5 stars

Everything is a compilation album by Teenage Jesus and the Jerks, released on July 18, 1995 by Atavistic Records. Despite its misleading title, it is actually just a reissue of side one of Lydia Lunch's 1986 Hysterie compilation plus two tracks from Pre Teenage Jesus and the Jerks.

== Track listing ==
All tracks are written by Lydia Lunch, except "Freud in Flop" by Jim Sclavunos.

No.	Title	Original release	Length
1.	"Red Alert"	No New York (1978)	0:21
2.	"Orphans"	Orphans 7" (1978)	2:24
3.	"The Closet"	No New York (1978)	3:47
4.	"Burning Rubber"	Teenage Jesus and the Jerks (1979)	1:38
5.	"I Woke Up Dreaming"	No New York (1978)	3:02
6.	"Freud in Flop"	Baby Doll 7" (1979)	0:42
7.	"Baby Doll"	Baby Doll 7" (1979)	1:32
8.	"Race Mixing"	Baby Doll 7" (1979)	1:01
9.	"Crown of Thorns"	Hysterie (1986)	0:42
10.	"My Eyes"	Pre Teenage Jesus and the Jerks (1979)	1:38
11.	"Less of Me"	Pre Teenage Jesus and the Jerks (1979)	1:34
12.	"Red Alert" (Mk II)	Teenage Jesus and the Jerks (1979)	0:24

== Personnel ==
Adapted from the Everything liner notes.

Teenage Jesus and the Jerks

- Kawashima Akiyoshi (Reck) – bass guitar (10, 11)
- James Chance – alto saxophone (10, 11)
- Bradley Field – drums, percussion
- Lydia Lunch – vocals, electric guitar
- Jim Sclavunos – bass guitar (1, 5, 6, 7, 8, 9)
- Gordon Stevenson – bass guitar (2, 3, 4, 12)

Production and additional personnel

- Julia Gorton – cover art
- Michael Romanowski – mastering (10, 11)
- J. G. Thirlwell – mastering (1–9, 12)

== Release history ==
Region	Date	Label	Format	Catalog
United States	1995	Atavistic	CD	ALP051
