= Scott B and Beth B =

American film producer

Scott B
- Born: United States
- Other name: Scott Billingsley
- Occupations: Film director, producer, screenwriter
- Known for: No Wave, Colab

Scott B & Beth B, B Faction, Two Folded Double-Sided Flyers, c. 1979

Beth B
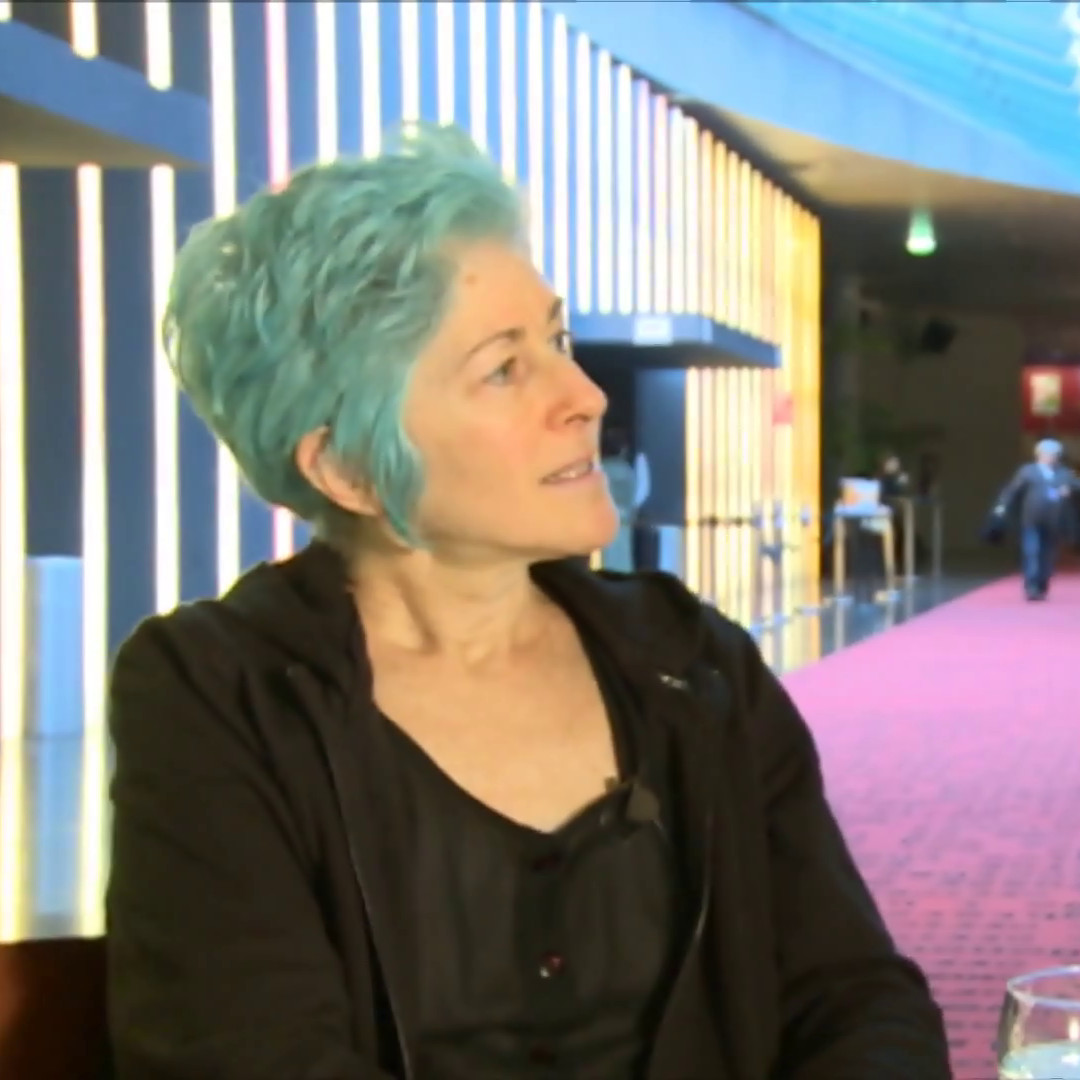
- Born: April 14, 1955 (age 71); New York City, New York, United States
- Occupations: Film director, producer, screenwriter
- Known for: No Wave

Beth and Scott B's Black Box and G-Man flyer for 1978 screenings at P.S. 1 featuring Jamie Nares

Scott B and Beth B (also known as Scott and Beth B, Beth and Scott B or The Bs after B Movies) were among the best-known New York No Wave underground film makers of the late 1970s and early 1980s.

They went on to form an independent film production company called B Movies (a pun on B movies), which made the feature film Vortex on 16-mm film, starring Lydia Lunch (of Teenage Jesus and the Jerks) with James Russo, Bill Rice, Haoui Montaug, Richard Prince, Brent Collins, and Ann Magnuson, among others. Beth B is the daughter of painter Ida Applebroog, who has collaborated on two of her films.

== Study and work history ==
During the late 1970s and early 1980s, Scott B and Beth B were among the most significant proponents of the punk bohemia, No Wave, no-budget style of underground punk filmmaking that was concerned with issues of simulation typical of postmodernism. Beth studied art at the School of Visual Arts and Scott was an exhibiting sculptor. They married and became associated with Colab (Collaborative Projects) and worked out of New York City's East Village area in conjunction with performance artists and noise musicians. They created a series of noisy, scruffy, deeply personal short Super 8 mm films in which they combined violent themes and darkly sinister images to explore the manner in which the individual is constrained by society.

The Bs' 8mm short films were full of downtown obsessions: terror politics, torture, sexual domination and submission, and punk rock music, presented in an assaultive manner, with musicians and other downtown personalities cast in their films. The films were quickly shot and edited, then screened as weekly film serial episodes at music clubs such as the Mudd Club and Max's Kansas City.

== Films ==
In G-Man, Scott B and Beth B address society's power structures as they depict a cop who feels compelled to employ a dominatrix. No Wave Cinema maker and artist Jamie Nares appears in it, among others. It developed out of the short video NYPD Arson and Explosions vs. FALN that was part of the Colab project of weekly aired television programs on cable called All Color News.

Black Box is the name of a torture contraption that was devised in the United States and used in foreign nations. In Black Box, a man played by Bob Mason is imprisoned in one such box, where he is tortured and the viewer endures his suffering. Black Box encapsulate all the Bs' major themes: crime, mind control, and sexual repression with the "minimal perfect-build" aesthetic of the man-sized vibrating containers Scott produced in his 1975 sculptor days. The plot is simple: a passive innocent leaves his tawdry room, neon Big Brother sign blinking through the window, Mission: Impossible flickering on the TV, and girlfriend draped across the bed, to be kidnapped Patty Hearst-style by a gang of punk thought-police. Menaced by an mad scientist, stripped, hung upside down, and tormented by surly, "shut up and suffer", Lydia Lunch, he is finally crammed into the dread refrigerator, where he, and we, are bombarded by a 10-minute crescendo of sound and light. Appearing in Black Box is Bob Mason (the hostage), Kiki Smith, Lydia Lunch, Christof Kohlhofer, Harvey Robbins, and Ulli Rimkus. According to film scholar Gwendolyn Audrey Foster, Black Box is a "terrifying allegory of societal restriction of the individual."

Letters to Dad For 11 minutes No Wave personalities such as Pat Place, Arto Lindsay, Vivienne Dick, John Ahearn, Kiki Smith, Tom Otterness and William "Bill" Rice, read messages addressed to what appears to be a father figure. It emerges after a while, however, that these are in fact letters from the victims of the Jonestown massacre to guru Jim Jones shortly before their mass suicide.

The Offenders, also shot in Super 8 mm, is a satire about a kidnapping. The Offenders was originally presented as a series of serial screenings at Max's Kansas City and the Mudd Club. Appearing in The Offenders is John Lurie, G. H. Hovagimyan, Scott B, Judy Nylon, art critic Edit DeAk, and Lydia Lunch, among others. The full version was shown at Film Forum and other film houses during the height of the New York City crime wave.

Vortex, shot in 16 mm and made for $70,000 thanks to a National Endowment for the Arts grant via Colab, is a film noirish drama featuring frequent collaborator Lydia Lunch as a detective who becomes immersed in corporate chicanery and the exploitation of politicians by companies soliciting defense contracts. The soundtrack for Vortex contains noise music by Richard Edson, Lydia Lunch, Adele Bertei, Kristian Hoffman, and The Bs. Vortex has been called the last No Wave film made.

== Post-Collaboration work history ==
- In 1987, Scott B and Joseph Nechvatal collaborated on an art performance at Hallwalls based on the poetry of St. John of the Cross, Flaubert's Temptation of St. Anthony and works of Jean Genet and Georges Bataille called Not a Door: A Spectacle, which featured the actors Richard Edson and Mark Boone Junior.
- Beth B went on to direct such films as Salvation! and Two Small Bodies.

== Scott B and Beth B filmography ==
- G-Man (1978)
- Black Box (1978)
- Letters to Dad (1979)
- The Offenders (1980)
- The Trap Door (1981)
- Vortex (1981)

== Beth B solo filmography ==
- 1987: Salvation!
- 1989: Belladonna (short) (actor, co-director with Ida Applebroog)
- 1991: American Nightmare (short)
- 1991: Thanatopsis (short)
- 1991: Stigmata (short)
- 1991: Shut Up and Suffer (short)
- 1992: Amnesia (short)
- 1993: Two Small Bodies (co-writer, co-producer)
- 1993: Under Lock and Key (short)
- 1994: High Heel Nights (short)
- 1995: ”Out of Sight/Out of Mind” (short)
- 1996: Visiting Desire (documentary) (cinematographer, producer, sound)
- 2002: Nerve.com: Downloading Sex (documentary) (co-director)
- 2013: Exposed
- 2016: Call Her Applebroog
- 2019: Lydia Lunch: The War Is Never Over

== Legacy ==
In 2023, the No Wave movement, including No Wave Cinema, received institutional recognition at the Centre Pompidou in Paris with a Nicolas Ballet curated exhibition entitled Who You Staring At: Culture visuelle de la scène no wave des années 1970 et 1980 (Visual culture of the no wave scene in the 1970s and 1980s). Featured in the installation was Scott B and Beth B's 11 minute film Letters to Dad (1979). An interview with Beth B, No Wave film screenings and musical performances, with three recorded conversations with No Wave artists, were included as part of the exhibition.
