= Drowning in Limbo =

Compilation album by Lydia Lunch
- Released: 1989
- Recorded: 1982–1985
- Genre: Post-punk
- Length: 50:57
- Label: Widowspeak Productions

Lydia Lunch chronology
Stinkfist (1987)	Drowning in Limbo (1989)	Don't Fear the Reaper (1991)

Professional ratings
Review scores
Source	Rating
Allmusic	4/5 stars
Spin Alternative Record Guide	5/10

Drowning in Limbo is a compilation album by the singer-songwriter Lydia Lunch, released in 1989 through Widowspeak Productions. It contains the EPs The Drowning of Lucy Hamilton and In Limbo, neither of which had been previously released on CD.

== Track listing ==
The Drowning of Lucy Hamilton
No.	Title	Writer(s)	Length
1.	"Emerald Pale Has Disappeared"	Lucy Hamilton, Lydia Lunch	5:20
2.	"The Drowning"	Lucy Hamilton, Lydia Lunch	1:47
3.	"How Men Die in Their Sleep"	Lucy Hamilton, Lydia Lunch	2:24
4.	"Lucy's Lost Her Head Again"	Lucy Hamilton, Lydia Lunch	3:24
5.	"3:20 Thursday Morning"	Lucy Hamilton, Lydia Lunch	3:35
6.	"A Quiet Night of Murder in Greenwich, CT"	Lucy Hamilton, Lydia Lunch	3:02

In Limbo
No.	Title	Lyrics	Music	Length
7.	"I Wish... I Wish"	Lydia Lunch	Thurston Moore	5:24
8.	"Friday Afternoon"	Lydia Lunch	Thurston Moore	4:11
9.	"1000 Lies"	Lydia Lunch	Thurston Moore	4:49
10.	"Some Boys"	Lydia Lunch	Murray Mitchell	4:49
11.	"Still Burning"	Rowland S. Howard	Rowland S. Howard	6:02
12.	"What Did You Do"	Lydia Lunch	Thurston Moore	6:12

== Personnel ==
- J. G. Thirlwell – remastering, design
- Annie Sprinkle – photography
