= Vortex (1981 film) =

- Vortex film poster featuring Lydia Lunch 1981
- Directed by: Scott B and Beth B
- Screenplay by: Scott B and Beth B
- Starring: Lydia Lunch; James Russo; Ann Magnuson; William Rice; Brent Collins
- Release date: 1981
- Country: United States
- Language: English

Vortex is a Colab-funded 1981 No Wave minimalist 16mm film noir directed by Scott B and Beth B starring Lydia Lunch and James Russo.

Beth B. and Scott B.'s script is a Burroughsian plot involving shadow corporate espionage. Their noirish cinematography gives the film a powerful punk atmosphere and mood through a distinctive use of inky blackness.

== No Wave musical score ==
The music for the film is an experimental No Wave score and soundtrack featuring contributions from underground musicians Adele Bertei, Richard Edson, and Lydia Lunch of Teenage Jesus and the Jerks.

The music style is influenced by gritty crime jazz, specifically drawing inspiration from Henry Mancini's score for Touch of Evil, a 1958 American film noir written and directed by Orson Welles. This musical style is then combined with the dissonant, raw, downtown New York noise music sound of the No Wave era.

== Cast ==
- Lydia Lunch as Angel Powers (private detective)
- James Russo as Anthony Demmer
- Bill Rice as Frederick Fields
- Ann Magnuson as Pamela Fleming
- Brent Collins as Peter
- Bill Corsair as John Allen
- Tom Webber as Ron Gavers
- Haoui Montaug as Harry
- Richard France as the Therapist
- David Kennedy as Comgressman White
- Bit parts were played by Chris Strang, Richard Prince, Gideon Horowitz, Christof Kohlhoffer, Dani Johnson, Bill Landis, Andy Whyland, Kai Eric, Scott B, Dick Miller, Jonathan Auerbach, Beth B, Yoshiko Chuma, Jim Jarmusch and Robin Winters

== Premise ==
Private detective Angel Powers investigates a politician's sudden death and thereby uncovers corporate corruption. Two arms manufacturers are vying for the same defense contract and need to bribe the same corrupt senator. When the senator is suddenly assassinated, it's up to Angel Powers to solve the crime and uncover the lucrative government defense contracts and the manipulation of politicians.
