= The Offenders (1980 film) =

1980 film

- Directed by: Scott B and Beth B
- Screenplay by: Scott B and Beth B
- Starring: John Lurie; Lydia Lunch; Bill Rice; Diego Cortez; Gerry Hovagimyan; Adele Bertei
- Release date: 1980
- Running time: 100 minutes
- Country: United States
- Language: English

The Offenders is a 1980 American No Wave color Super 8 film directed by Scott B and Beth B that, as a punk melodrama, post-modernly refers back to the 1921 melodrama film The Offenders directed by Fenwicke L. Holmes. It originally was presented as a serial that screened at Max's Kansas City and the Mudd Club whereby each week the attendees paid for the making of next week's episodes.

The full version of The Offenders was first shown on March 6, 1980, at Film Forum and then at other film houses during the height of the early-1980s New York City crime wave. Publicity photographs for The Offenders were shot by Marcia Resnick.

== Premise ==
The Offenders is a raucous punk satire of the teenager-leaves-home genre. As in the detached and aloof manner of Andy Warhol's underground films, it tells an amusingly deadpan story centered on the kidnapping of a young woman named Laura (played by Adele Bertei) and her abusive, controlling father, Dr. Moore, played by Bill Rice. An out-of-control gang of punk hoodlums flesh out the cast.

Shot at Club 57 and other Lower East Side of Manhattan locations, the film featured a cast of 16 edgy young performers from the post-punk Downtown scene, including John Lurie (who plays The Lizard), Diego Cortez, Laura Kennedy, Johnny O’Kane, Ann Magnuson, Lydia Lunch, Bradley Field, Evan Lurie, Pat Place, Kristian Hoffman, Judy Nylon, Gerry Hovagimyan, Marcia Resnick and Edit DeAk.

== Preservation ==
The film received a digital restoration by The Museum of Modern Art through funding provided by The Celeste Bartos Fund for Film Preservation.
