= Diego Cortez =

American filmmaker and art curator (1946–2021)

- Diego Cortez in his Stanton Street apartment in 1977. Photo by George Schustowicz. Courtesy ABC No Rio Book Collection.
- Born: James Allan Curtis; September 30, 1946; Geneva, Illinois, U.S.
- Died: June 21, 2021 (aged 74); Burlington, North Carolina, U.S.
- Education: Illinois State University (BA); School of the Art Institute of Chicago (MA)
- Movement: No wave

James Allan Curtis (September 30, 1946 – June 21, 2021), known professionally as Diego Cortez, was an American filmmaker and art curator closely associated with the no wave period in New York City. Cortez was the co-founder of the Mudd Club, and he curated the influential post-punk art show New York/New Wave, which brought the then aspiring artist Jean-Michel Basquiat to fame.

== Early life and education ==
Cortez was born James Allan Curtis on September 30, 1946, in Geneva, Illinois, to Jean (née Ham) and Allan Curtis. His mother was a manicurist while his father was a warehouse manager at a steel company. Curtis grew up in the nearby town of Wheaton, Illinois. He graduated with a bachelor's degree from the Illinois State University and received a master's degree from the School of the Art Institute of Chicago in 1973. He studied performance art as well as film and video production at the institute with teachers including Avant-garde filmmaker Stan Brakhage and the Korean-American filmmaker Nam June Paik.

Curtis adopted the pseudonym Diego Cortez in 1973 while moving to New York City as a tribute to the Hispanic neighborhood of Chicago where he had lived.

== Career ==
Cortez moved to New York City in 1973, where he worked as a studio assistant to conceptual artist Dennis Oppenheim and later with designer and performance artist Vito Acconci. He went on to embed himself in the music and arts scene in the city while holding multiple jobs including working as a security guard at the Museum of Modern Art. He also performed with Avant-garde artist Hermann Nitsch and was a founding member of the New York-based artists group Colab. In 1978, he co-founded the Mudd Club, a nightclub in the Tribeca neighborhood of Lower Manhattan, with Steve Maas and punk artist and music manager Anya Phillips. He has a cameo appearance in Scott and Beth B's No Wave film The Offenders.

During this period, he also performed with artists Kathy Acker and Laurie Anderson, directed music videos for rock bands Talking Heads and Blondie, and organized showings of works by the singer and songwriter Patti Smith. He also wrote the book Private Elvis, containing photographs of American singer and actor Elvis Presley during Presley's time with the army, that he found in West Germany. Cortez was the NYC production advisor to Brian Eno on the no wave record No New York (1978) which was released by Island Records.

In the late 1970s, the avant-garde music and art movement called No Wave came about in the downtown region of the city. In 1981, Cortez curated the group exhibition New York/New Wave to showcase a new generation of artists in the downtown art scene. The show was held at the P.S. 1 Contemporary Art Center, now known as MoMA PS1, in Long Island City, Queens. It was a massive exhibition featuring over 100 artists including Andy Warhol, David Byrne, William S. Burroughs, Robert Mapplethorpe, Nan Goldin, Keith Haring, Fab Five Freddy, Futura 2000, and Ann Magnuson. The show brought Jean-Michel Basquiat to fame by attracting the attention of art dealers such as Annina Nosei and Bruno Bischofberger. In 1982, Basquiat introduced Cortez to his then-girlfriend Madonna, who invited Cortez to be her manager, but he declined to focus on curating art shows. He later declined an offer from Larry Gagosian for a directorship at his gallery.

Cortez continued to work as an art agent and curator, working with Brian Eno, and on the Luciano Benetton and Frederick Roos collections. During the latter part of his career he was unsuccessful in trying to start a museum in Puerto Rico. He released an album, Traumdeutung, in 2014, which was an eclectic mix of music and sounds of his snoring.

Cortez was a member of the authentication committee for the estate of Jean-Michel Basquiat, which ceased operation in 2012.

== Death ==
Cortez died from kidney failure at the age of 74 on June 20, 2021, in Burlington, North Carolina. Cortez had been in hospice while living in nearby Saxapahaw, North Carolina. A tribute to Diego Cortez was published in The Brooklyn Rail in October 2021.

== Books ==
- Cortez, Diego; Paulini, Rudolf (1978). Private Elvis. Stuttgart, Ger.: Fey. ISBN 3-88361-101-8. OCLC 5013567.
- Cortez, Diego; O'Brien, Glenn; Sui, Anna (2005). Maripolarama. PowerHouse Books. ISBN 978-1576872727
- Basquiat, Jean-Michel; Buchhart, Dieter; Keller, Sam; Gabriel, John William; Partridge, Matthew (2010). Basquiat. Riehen/Basel. ISBN 978-3-905632-81-1. OCLC 644664734.
- Cortez, Diego (2012). Bianca Casady: Daisy Chain. Cheim & Read. ISBN 9780985141028

== See also ==
- Conceptual art
- Colab
- Mudd Club
- Tier 3
- Just Another Asshole
- New wave music
- No wave cinema
- Institutional Critique
- Postmodern art

== Sources ==
- Boch, Richard.The Mudd Club. Feral House, 2017.
- Hager, Steve. Art After Midnight: The East Village Scene. St. Matins Press, 1986.
- Masters, Marc. No Wave. London: Black Dog Publishing, 2007. ISBN 978-1-906155-02-5
- Moore, Alan W., and Marc Miller (eds.). ABC No Rio Dinero: The Story of a Lower East Side Art Gallery. New York: Collaborative Projects, 1985
- Pearlman, Alison, Unpackaging Art of the 1980s. Chicago: University Of Chicago Press, 2003.
- Reynolds, Simon. "Contort Yourself: No Wave New York." In Rip It Up and Start Again: Post-punk 1978–84. London: Faber and Faber, Ltd., 2005.
- Taylor, Marvin J. (ed.). The Downtown Book: The New York Art Scene, 1974–1984, foreword by Lynn Gumpert. Princeton: Princeton University Press, 2006. ISBN 0-691-12286-5
