= The Early Months =

Compilation album by No Trend
- Released: March 28, 1995
- Recorded: January 9, 1983; March 18, 1983
- Genres: Noise rock, post-hardcore, no wave
- Length: 72:46
- Label: Teenbeat Records
- Producers: Don Zientara, Eric

No Trend chronology
Tritonian Nash-Vegas Polyester Complex (1986)	The Early Months (1995)	More (2001)

Professional ratings
Review scores
Source	Rating
AllMusic	4/5 stars

The Early Months, (also known as Teen Love: The Early Months), is a compilation album by American noise rock band No Trend, released in 1995 through Teenbeat Records. The disc compiles demo and live recordings that were made back when the band first formed, hence the title. The album was only released on CD format, limited to 1,100 copies. The album cover is exactly the same picture used for the band's 1983 debut extended play Teen Love, which was drawn by the band's guitarist Frank Price, who was credited as Jim Jones in the liner notes.

The first nine tracks were demo recordings that were recorded on March 18, 1983 at Inner Ear Studios. The last ten tracks were recorded during a live show the band played on January 9, 1983 at the Marble Bar.

== Track listing ==
No.	Title	Length
1.	"Cancer"	3:00
2.	"Hanging Out In Georgetown"	2:07
3.	"Kiss Ass"	4:01
4.	"Family Style"	4:34
5.	"Reality Breakdown"	4:46
6.	"Human Garbage"	2:57
7.	"Purple Paisleys Make Me Happy"	3:02
8.	"Mass Sterilization"	3:05
9.	"Teen Love"	6:38
10.	"Turn Away"	1:03
11.	"Cancer"	3:04
12.	"Blow Dry"	3:04
13.	"Polyester Man"	2:07
14.	"Kiss Ass"	5:35
15.	"Teen Love"	6:34
16.	"Mass Sterilization"	2:25
17.	"Hanging Out In Georgetown"	2:25
18.	"Death"	6:25
19.	"Punker"	5:14
Total length:		72:46

== Personnel ==
=== Performers ===
- Jeff Mentges - Vocals
- Frank Price - Guitar, Artwork
- Bob Strasser - Bass
- Michael Salkind - Drums

=== Production ===
- Don Zientara - Recording
- Eric - Recording
