= Pre Teenage Jesus and the Jerks =

EP by Teenage Jesus and the Jerks
- Released: November 1979
- Recorded: 1977
- Genre: No wave
- Length: 6:06
- Label: ZE

Teenage Jesus and the Jerks chronology
| Teenage Jesus and the Jerks (1979) | Pre Teenage Jesus and the Jerks (1979) | Everything (1995) |

Professional ratings
Review scores
| Source | Rating |
|---|---|
| Spin Alternative Record Guide | 4/10 |

Pre Teenage Jesus and the Jerks is a single by Teenage Jesus and the Jerks, released in November 1979 by ZE Records.

The release presents 1977 recordings, a prehistory of the band. Teenage Jesus and the Jerks (Lydia Lunch with Gordon Stevenson and Bradley Field) would rerecord "The Closet" for the 1978 No New York compilation.

== Track listing ==
All tracks are written by Lydia Lunch.

Side one
| No. | Title | Length |
|---|---|---|
| 1. | "The Closet" | 2:54 |

Side two
| No. | Title | Length |
|---|---|---|
| 1. | "Less of Me" | 1:38 |
| 2. | "My Eyes" | 1:34 |

== Personnel ==
Adapted from the Pre Teenage Jesus and the Jerks liner notes.

Teenage Jesus and the Jerks

- Kawashima Akiyoshi (Reck) – bass guitar
- James Chance – alto saxophone, mixing
- Bradley Field – drums, percussion
- Lydia Lunch – vocals, electric guitar, mixing

Production and additional personnel

- Julia Gorton – cover art

== Release history ==
| Region | Date | Label | Format | Catalog |
|---|---|---|---|---|
| United States | 1979 | ZE | LP | ZE 12011 |
| France | 1979 | Celluloid | LP | CEL 6565 |
