= Hot tip =

Hot tip or Hot Tip may refer to:

- Hot Tip, a 1935 film
- Hot Tip, a 1977 pinball machine by Williams
- Hot Tip, song on Smoke in the Shadows album

== See also ==
- Tip (disambiguation)
