= Teenage Jesus and the Jerks (album) =

Compilation album by Teenage Jesus and the Jerks
- Released: 1979
- Recorded: 1978–1979
- Genre: No wave; avant-punk
- Length: 9:22
- Label: Migraine
- Producer: Woody Payne, Robert Quine

Teenage Jesus and the Jerks chronology
Teenage Jesus and the Jerks (1979)	Pre Teenage Jesus and the Jerks (1979)

Professional ratings
Review scores
Source	Rating
Spin Alternative Record Guide	4/10

Teenage Jesus and the Jerks is a compilation album by Teenage Jesus and the Jerks, released in 1979 by Migraine Records. The album, a no wave record, was recorded from 1978 to 1979, and was produced by Robert Quine of Richard Hell and the Voidoids and Woody Payne. It contains songs from their first two singles, "Orphans" and "Baby Doll", and two tracks from the Brian Eno-curated compilation album No New York (1978). The track "Less of Me" would later feature on their debut extended play (EP), Pre Teenage Jesus and the Jerks (1979), and numerous tracks from the album would later appear on further compilation albums from both the band and lead member Lydia Lunch, from 1986 to 2015.

== Track listing ==
All tracks are written by Lydia Lunch, except "Freud in Flop" by Jim Sclavunos.

Side one
No.	Title	Original release	Length
1.	"Freud in Flop"	Baby Doll 7" (1979)	0:42
2.	"Race Mixing"	Baby Doll 7" (1979)	1:08
3.	"Baby Doll"	Baby Doll 7" (1979)	1:32
4.	"Burning Rubber"	No New York	1:34
5.	"Red Alert"	No New York	0:24

Side two
No.	Title	Original release	Length
1.	"Orphans"	Orphans 7" (1978)	2:40
2.	"Less of Me"	Orphans 7" (1978)	1:22

== Personnel ==
Adapted from the Teenage Jesus and the Jerks liner notes.

Teenage Jesus and the Jerks

- Bradley Field – drums, percussion
- Lydia Lunch – vocals, electric guitar
- Jim Sclavunos – bass guitar (A1–A5)
- Gordon Stevenson – bass guitar (B1, B2)

Production and additional personnel

- Woody Payne – production (A4, A5)
- Robert Quine – production (A1–A3, B1, B2)

== Release history ==
Region	Date	Label	Format	Catalog
United States	1979	Migraine	LP	CC-336-LL
