= Turn Away =

Turn Away may refer to:

- "Turn Away", a song by Andy Timmons from Ear X-Tacy
- "Turn Away", a song by the Awakening from Risen
- "Turn Away", a song by Beck from Morning Phase
- "Turn Away", a song by the Carpenters from Ticket to Ride
- "Turn Away", a song by Dana Simpson from Shiver
- "Turn Away", a song by Down by Law from Blue
- "Turn Away", a song by East India Youth from Culture of Volume
- "Turn Away", a song by Forgetters from Forgetters
- "Turn Away", a song by James Skelly & the Intenders from Love Undercover
- "Turn Away", a song by James Taylor from That's Why I'm Here
- "Turn Away", a song by Jane Olivor from First Night
- "Turn Away", a song by Maria McKee from Peddlin' Dreams
- "Turn Away", a song by Mickey Thomas from Over the Edge
- "Turn Away", a song by Mikal Cronin from MCII
- "Turn Away", a song by Moving Units from Dangerous Dreams
- "Turn Away", a song by No Trend from The Early Months
- "Turn Away", a song by Orange Juice from Rip It Up
- "Turn Away", a song by the Quireboys from This Is Rock'n'Roll
- "Turn Away", a song by Robyn Loau from the single "Sick with Love"
- "Turn Away", a song by Sparkle from Sparkle
- "Turn Away", a song by Shaman from Reason
- "Turn Away", a song by Mary Ellen Quinn from the soundtrack for Radioactive Dreams
- "Turn Away", a song by Barry Ryan
- "Turn Away", a song by Buddahead
- "Turn Away", a song by Craig Douglas
- "Turn Away", a song by the Flying Circus
- "Turn Away", a song by Gary Barnacle
- "Turn Away", a song by The Heart Throbs
- "Turn Away", a song by Malese Jow
- "Turn Away", a song by Swanee
- "Turn Away", a song by Wet
- "Turn Away", a short story by Ed Gorman
