= Tritonian Nash-Vegas Polyester Complex =

Studio album by No Trend
- Released: 1986
- Recorded: August, 1986 at Central Studio, Silver Spring, MD
- Genre: No wave, experimental rock, jazz rock
- Length: 30:56
- Label: Touch and Go

No Trend chronology
A Dozen Dead Roses (1985)	Tritonian Nash-Vegas Polyester Complex (1986)	More (2001)

Professional ratings
Review scores
Source	Rating
Allmusic	4/5 stars

Tritonian Nash-Vegas Polyester Complex is the third studio album by American no wave band No Trend, released in 1986 through Touch and Go Records. The album continues the experimental path the band created with their previous record, A Dozen Dead Roses. The album was ill-received among the American underground, to the point that owners of the record would return it for refunds. Up until the reissue of Too Many Humans in 2020, Tritonian Nash-Vegas Polyester Complex and its follow-up album More were the only No Trend albums to be available through digital outlets such as iTunes due to the belief that the master tapes for all of the band's previous material were lost.

== Track listing ==
No.	Title	Length
1.	"One Under Parr"	1:18
2.	"Copperhead"	2:08
3.	"Without Me"	3:30
4.	"Fred Reality"	3:04
5.	"Space Disco"	2:08
6.	"Cry of the Dirtballs"	4:35
7.	"Angel Angel Down We Go"	4:56
8.	"Overweight Baby Boom Critter"	2:14
9.	"Choc-O-Jet"	2:36
10.	"Freak"	2:36
11.	"Pre Bel Rising"	1:36

== Personnel ==
=== Performers ===
- Jeff Mentges - Vocals (Credited as Clif "Babe" Ontego)
- Nick Smiley - Alto Saxophone
- Scott Rafal - Baritone Saxophone
- Johnny Ontego - Tenor Saxophone, Horn Arrangements
- Paul Henzey - Trumpet
- Leif - Guitar
- Bobby Birdsong - Guitar
- Smokey - Bass
- Dean Evangelista - Keyboards
- Rogelio Maxwell - Cello
- Chris Pestelozzie - Percussion
- James "Fuzz" Peachy - Drums

=== Production ===
- Ken Mora - Engineering, Mixing
- No Trend - Music, Mixing
