= No Trend =

US musical group

Background information
- Origin: Ashton, Maryland, United States
- Genres: Noise rock, hardcore punk
- Years active: 1982–1988
- Labels: No Trend; Touch and Go; Blast First Petite; Teen Beat
- Past members: Dean Evangelista; Eric Leifert; Jeff Mentges (vocals); Greg Miller; Brian Nelson; Buck Parr; James Peachey; Frank Price (guitar); Jack Anderson; Michael Salkind (drums); Bob Strasser (bass); Christine Niblack (bass)

No Trend was an American noise rock and hardcore punk group from Ashton, Maryland, formed in 1982. They were considered anti-hardcore, with the members, especially guitarist and lyricist Frank Price, vehement about their abhorrence towards the punk youth subculture. The band was known for their confrontational stage performances, which normally involved aggressively baiting their punk audience. They were influenced by Public Image Ltd. and Flipper.

They released three full-length albums, two released independently and one issued through Touch and Go Records. A fourth album that was recorded in 1987 but never released was finally issued as More in 2001.

== History ==
No Trend formed in 1982 in Ashton, Maryland and consisted of Jeff Mentges (vocals), Bob Strasser (bass), Frank Price (guitar), and Michael Salkind (drums). Prior to No Trend, Mentges, Salkind, Strasser and Brad Pumphrey (guitar) were a band called the Aborted; they nearly played out with Government Issue. No Trend formed as a reaction against the growing punk rock movement of the time. Their early period has been described as "dark" and "nihilistic". The group intended to write a single song for one performance only, but the group soon wrote enough material for a release: their debut extended play, the Teen Love EP, a 7" independently issued by the band. In August 1983, Strasser and Salkind left the band. Jack Anderson (bass) and Greg Miller (drums) joined and the quintet released their first full-length studio album, titled Too Many Humans, which met moderate success within the American underground music scene. In the spring of 1984 the band rerecorded the Teen Love 7” and released it as a 12” with two additional tracks.

After an aborted tour during the summer of 1984, Price, Anderson and Miller all left the group, leaving Mentges as the only member of the group. Mentges would later get other musicians to join the band, and the newly reformed No Trend would go back in studio to record their second record, A Dozen Dead Roses, which was released in 1985. This record featured a significant change in sound when compared to the cold, noisy tone found on previous releases. The record featured vocalist Lydia Lunch contributing to multiple songs. The songs that featured Lunch were released previously on the 10" extended play Heart of Darkness through her label Widowspeak Productions. She also issued a No Trend compilation album in 1986, titled When Death Won't Solve Your Problems, through the same label.

The band would later be signed to Touch and Go Records and would release their third album, Tritonian Nash-Vegas Polyester Complex, through them in 1986. A fourth album was recorded in 1987, but after they showed the label the record, Touch and Go refused to release it, deeming that it was "too weird" to release. They were unable to find a label to release the album, effectively putting an end to the band. The album would remain unreleased until Morphious Archives, a label that specializes in releasing obscure records, gained the rights to release the album. It was finally issued in 2001 as More.

After the group's official disbandment, Jeff Mentges attended the University of Maryland as a film student, and subsequently directed the John Holmes biographical film Of Flesh and Blood in 1990. Founding member and original No Trend guitarist Frank Price committed suicide in 1989, which brought shock to both members and fans of the band. A compilation of unreleased studio and live tracks was released through TeenBeat Records in 1995, titled The Early Months.

== Members ==
- Jeff Mentges – vocals (1982–1988)
- Frank Price – guitar (1982–1984)
- Bob Strasser – bass (1982–1984)
- Stephan "Chazz" Jacobs – electric cello and percussion (1982–1983)
- Christine Niblack – bass (1983 tour)
- Michael Salkind – drums (1982–1983)
- Jack Anderson – bass (1983–1984)
- Greg Miller – drums (1983–1984)
- Danny "Spidako" Demetro – keyboards (1985–1986)
- Robert "Smokey" Marymont – bass (1985–1988)
- Dean Evangelista – guitar, keyboards (1985–1988)
- Benard Demassy – saxophone (1985–1986)
- Ken Rudd – drums (1985–1986)
- James "Fuzz" Peachy – drums (1986–1988)
- Nick Smiley – saxophone (1986–1988)
- Scott Rafal – saxophone (1986–1988)
- Johnny Ontego – saxophone (1986–1988)
- Paul Henzy – trumpet (1986–1988)
- Leif – guitar (1986–1988)
- Bobby Birdsong – guitar (1986–1988)
- Rogelio Maxwell – cello (1986–1988)
- Chris Pestelozzie – percussion (1986–1988)

== Discography ==
Studio albums

- Too Many Humans..... (1984, No Trend Records)
- A Dozen Dead Roses (1985, No Trend Records)
- Tritonian Nash-Vegas Polyester Complex (1986, Touch and Go)
- More (2001, Morphius Archives)

Compilations

- When Death Won't Solve Your Problems (1986, Widowspeak Productions)
- The Early Months (1995, TeenBeat)
- You Deserve Your Life (2018, Digital Regress)
- Too Many Humans / Teen Love (2020, Drag City)

Extended plays

- Teen Love (1983, No Trend)
- with Lydia Lunch: Heart of Darkness (1985, Widowspeak Productions)
