= Smoke in the Shadows =

Studio album by Lydia Lunch
- Released: November 23, 2004
- Recorded: 2002–2003 at Newzone Studio, Los Angeles, California; 2003 at the Antechamber, South Pasadena, California, United States
- Length: 51:09
- Label: Atavistic (US); Breakin Beats (UK)
- Producer: Nels Cline; Tommy Grenas; Lydia Lunch; Len Del Rio

Lydia Lunch chronology
Widowspeak (1998)	Smoke in the Shadows (2004)

Smoke in the Shadows is the fifth album by American singer-songwriter Lydia Lunch, released in November 2004 by record labels Atavistic and Breakin Beats.

== Reception ==
Professional ratings
Review scores
Source	Rating
AllMusic	4/5 stars
Mojo	4/5 stars
PopMatters	favorable
The Telegraph	unfavorable
Tiny Mix Tapes	4/5 stars
Uncut	3/5 stars

Uncut wrote that it "may be the best thing she's done in years". Tiny Mix Tapes wrote that it "distills a myriad of diverse interests into a focused and effective album." PopMatters called it "Lunch's most listenable record since Queen of Siam, but since she's no longer capable of (or interested in) surprising us or conveying convincing vulnerability, it lacks anything as truly chilling as 'Mechanical Flattery'."

== Track listing ==
No.	Title	Writer(s)	Length
1.	"Hangover Hotel"	Nels Cline, Lydia Lunch	2:03
2.	"Smoke in the Shadows"	Adele Bertei, Tommy Grenas, Lydia Lunch, Len Del Rio	4:53
3.	"Johnny Behind the Deuce"	Nels Cline, Lydia Lunch	3:09
4.	"I Love How You..."	Nels Cline, Lydia Lunch	3:12
5.	"Touch My Evil"	Tommy Grenas, Lydia Lunch, Len Del Rio	4:38
6.	"Lost World"	Tommy Grenas, Lydia Lunch, Len Del Rio	3:28
7.	"Sway"	Tommy Grenas, Lydia Lunch, Len Del Rio	4:16
8.	"Gone City"	Tommy Grenas, Lydia Lunch, Len Del Rio	2:19
9.	"Blame"	Adele Bertei, Tommy Grenas, Lydia Lunch, Len Del Rio	4:01
10.	"Pass Like Night"	Tommy Grenas, Lydia Lunch, Len Del Rio	5:26
11.	"Portrait of the Minus Man"	Lydia Lunch, Terry Edwards	2:47
12.	"Trick Baby"	Adele Bertei, Tommy Grenas, Lydia Lunch, Len Del Rio	4:21
13.	"Hot Tip"	Tommy Grenas, Lydia Lunch, Len Del Rio	6:36

== Personnel ==
- Lydia Lunch – vocals, production, design
- Joseph Berardi – vibraphone on "Hangover Hotel", "Johnny Behind the Deuce" and "I Love How You..."
- Adele Bertei – backing vocals
- Carla Bozulich – vocals on "I Love How You...", backing vocals on "Hot Tip"
- Alex Cline – drums on "Hangover Hotel", "Johnny Behind the Deuce" and "I Love How You..."
- Nels Cline – guitar, record producer
- Terry Edwards – all instruments on "Portrait of the Minus Man"
- John Fumo – trumpet on "Hangover Hotel", "Johnny Behind the Deuce" and "I Love How You..."
- Vinny Golia – alto flute and baritone saxophone on "Hangover Hotel", "Johnny Behind the Deuce" and "I Love How You..."
- Tommy Grenas – guitar, drums, synthesizer, production
- Joel Hamilton – double bass on "Hangover Hotel", "Johnny Behind the Deuce" and "I Love How You..."
- Niels Van Hoorn – saxophone
- Ryan Kirk – guitar on "Blame"
- Chuck Manning – alto saxophone on "Hangover Hotel", "Johnny Behind the Deuce" and "I Love How You..."
- Don Ostermann – trombone on "Hangover Hotel", "Johnny Behind the Deuce" and "I Love How You..."
- Len Del Rio – synthesizer, organ, piano, programming, production, mixing, recording
- Ryan Kirk – engineering
- Wayne Peet – mixing, recording
- Marc Viaplana – photography, design
