= Lydia Lunch: The War Is Never Over =

2019 documentary film by Beth B

Lydia Lunch: The War Is Never Over is a 2019 documentary film about musician Lydia Lunch. It was directed by New York underground filmmaker Beth B.
