= 13.13 =

Studio album by Lydia Lunch
- Released: June 1982
- Recorded: July 1981 at Perspective Sound, Sun Valley, California; August 1981 at Preferred Sound, Woodland Hills, California, United States
- Genre: Post-punk
- Length: 39:58
- Label: Ruby (original US release); Situation Two (original UK release)
- Producer: 13.13; Lydia Lunch

Lydia Lunch chronology
| The Agony Is the Ecstacy (1982) | 13.13 (1982) | In Limbo (1984) |

13.13 is the second album by American artist Lydia Lunch, released in June 1982 by record label Ruby.

== Content ==
Trouser Press writes that the album "[revives] the grind-and-caterwaul of Teenage Jesus as filtered through Metal Box-era PiL, all deviant guitar and rolling rhythms". UK magazine Fact wrote that "sonically it comes over like a more droning, dissolute Stateside cousin of Siouxsie & the Banshees' Juju". The musicians who played on and co-wrote the album had been members of first wave Los Angeles punk band the Weirdos.

== Reception ==
Professional ratings
Review scores
| Source | Rating |
|---|---|
| AllMusic | 2/5 stars |
| Trouser Press | mixed |
| Spin Alternative Record Guide | 5/10 |

13.13 has divided critics. Trouser Press wrote that "Like her previous stuff, it manages to be simultaneously fascinating and annoying." In its retrospective review, Fact magazine qualified it as a "masterpiece".

== Track listing ==
All tracks are written by 13.13 (Dix Denney, Lydia Lunch, Cliff Martinez and Gregg Williams), except as noted.

Side A
| No. | Title | Writer(s) | Length |
|---|---|---|---|
| 1. | "Stares to Nowhere" | | 4:15 |
| 2. | "3x3" | | 6:05 |
| 3. | "This Side of Nowhere" | Lydia Lunch | 4:15 |
| 4. | "Snakepit Breakdown" | Lydia Lunch | 4:07 |

Side B
| No. | Title | Writer(s) | Length |
|---|---|---|---|
| 1. | "Dance of the Dead Children" | Lydia Lunch | 2:49 |
| 2. | "Suicide Ocean" | | 5:56 |
| 3. | "Lock Your Door" | | 5:27 |
| 4. | "Afraid of Your Company" | | 7:04 |

== Personnel ==
13.13

- Dix Denney – guitar
- Lydia Lunch – vocals, piano, production
- Cliff Martinez – drums, percussion
- Greg Williams – bass guitar

Production and additional personnel

- 13.13 – production
- David Arnoff – photography
- Bob Blank – engineering
- Steven McDonald – engineering
- James Partie – photography
- Jeff Price – design
- Thom Wilson – engineering

== Charts ==
| Chart (1982) | Peak position |
|---|---|
| UK Indie Chart | 19 |
