= Black Box (1978 film) =

1978 film

- Directed by: Scott B and Beth B
- Screenplay by: Scott B and Beth B
- Starring: Bob Mason; Lydia Lunch; Kiki Smith; Christof Kohlhofer; Harvey Robbins; Ulli Rimkus
- Release date: 1978
- Running time: 25 minutes
- Country: United States
- Language: English

Black Box is a 1978 American short film directed by Scott B and Beth B and starring Lydia Lunch and Bob Mason.

== Premise ==
A man is tortured by his girlfriend and then locked inside a black box.

== Reception ==
According to film scholar Gwendolyn Audrey Foster, Black Box is a "terrifying allegory of societal restriction of the individual."
