= Matrikamantra =

Studio album and Live album by Lydia Lunch
- Released: October 31, 1997
- Recorded: Harbinger House, New York; March 1, 1997 at Palace Acropolis, Prague, Czech Republic
- Genre: Industrial, Spoken Word, Avant-Garde
- Length: 96:31
- Label: Atavistic/Figurehead Records (1997) Crippled Dick Hot Wax! (1998)
- Producer: Lydia Lunch

Lydia Lunch chronology
Shotgun Wedding (1991)	Matrikamantra (1997)	Widowspeak (1998)

Matrikamantra is a 2-CD album by the singer-songwriter Lydia Lunch, first released on October 31, 1997 by Atavistic/Figurehead Records in 1997 (ALP94CD), and a year later in Germany through Crippled Dick Hot Wax! (CDHW 050). The first disc is a studio album that contains new material, while the second disc contains a live performance recorded at Palace Acropolis in 1997.

== Track listing ==
All lyrics are written by Lydia Lunch; all music is composed by Joseph Budenholzer.

Disc one (Harbinger House)
No.	Title	Length
1.	"Need to Feed"	3:51
2.	"Inverted Dream"	2:33
3.	"Disease of the Night"	5:45
4.	"Psychic Anthropology"	3:46
5.	"Cesspool Called History"	5:01
6.	"Dread"	4:25
7.	"Escape"	2:50
8.	"Itch"	2:40
9.	"Solo Mystico"	2:46
10.	"Lethe"	3:26
11.	"In Spite of God"	2:56
12.	"Archives of Blood"	2:55
13.	"Outpatients"	5:22

Disc two (Live in Prague)
No.	Title	Length
1.	"Intro/World of Whispers"	8:30
2.	"Cesspool Called History"	5:18
3.	"Gravediggers of the Future"	5:45
4.	"Need to Feed"	6:36
5.	"Perfumed Corpses"	6:29
6.	"Disease of the Night"	4:33
7.	"In Spite of God/Vortex"	11:12
8.	"Hermones"	3:50
9.	"Dread"	5:44
10.	"Outpatients/Exit"	9:23

== Personnel ==
Harbinger House

- Joseph Budenholzer – sound design
- Joan Dalin – violin
- Paul Geluso – mastering
- Lydia Lunch – vocals
- Laura Rogers – flute
- Greg Shakar – clarinet, mastering

Live in Prague

- Joseph Budenholzer – sound design
- Tomáš Hadrava – mixing
- Kamilsky – bass guitar, mastering, mixing
- Lydia Lunch – vocals
- Colin Stuart – mastering, mixing
- Mr. Zak – mastering
