= Exposed (2013 film) =

- Film poster
- Directed by: Beth B
- Starring: Julie Atlas Muz; Mat Fraser; Bunny Love; Dirty Martini; James Habacker; Bambi the Mermaid; Rose Wood
- Release date: February 8, 2013 (Berlin)
- Country: United States
- Language: English

Exposed is a 2013 American documentary film directed by Beth B.

The film premiered in the Panorama portion of the 2013 Berlin International Film Festival.

== Synopsis ==
American documentary about eight women and men using their naked bodies, be they statuesque, disabled, transgender, for the cutting edge of burlesque.
