= Cass Winthrop =

- Another World character
- Portrayed by: Stephen Schnetzer
- Duration: 1982–2002, 2005–06
- First appearance: July 21, 1982
- Last appearance: July 18, 2006
- Created by: Corinne Jacker
- Introduced by: Paul Rauch
- Crossover appearances: As the World Turns; Guiding Light
In-universe information
- Other names: Cass Cadwallader Winthrop
- Occupation: Lawyer; Co-owner of Wallingford's; 0wner of Winthrop Publishing
- Mother: Claudia Winthrop
- Brothers: Morgan Winthrop
- Sisters: Stacey Winthrop
- Wife: Kathleen McKinnon (1986–92); Frankie Frame (1990, 1993–96); Lila Roberts (1999–)
- Daughters: Charlie Winthrop
- Stepdaughters: Jasmine Cory
- Nieces: Megan Singleton
- First cousins: Alan Winthrop

Cass Winthrop is a fictional character on the soap opera Another World. He was portrayed by Stephen Schnetzer from 1982 to 1999. Schnetzer also appeared as Cass on As the World Turns from 1999 to 2002 and again from 2005 to 2006 and on Guiding Light in 2002.

== Storylines ==
Cass Cadwallader Winthrop came to town as a scheming but good-natured casanova - a skilled attorney who kept looking for shortcuts to success. He was a former lover of Felicia Gallant and the two resumed their complicated romance, though Cass also had eyes for Sally Frame. Cass and Felicia later became best (platonic) friends and always stood by each other throughout the years.

Cass had a tumultuous relationship with Cecile DePoulignac, which ended with her marriage to a foreign prince, though Cass had a hard time accepting it, triggering many comic complications. Cass formed a partnership with aspiring reporter Kathleen McKinnon, leading to several years of romantic sparring, criminal investigations, dangerous adventures, and the first real love of his life. At one point, Kathleen was paralyzed by Carl Hutchins and tried to withdraw from the world, but Cass nursed her back to health. The two finally married, and left Bay City. Some months later, Kathleen was seemingly killed in a plane crash. Cass returned to Bay City, and went into an emotional tailspin that only his, Kathleen, and Felicia's close friend Wallingford was able to bring him out of, telling him that Kathleen had been the best part of him. Sadly Wallingford died not long afterwards (due to the real-life death of actor Brent Collins), causing deep grief to both Cass and Felicia.

Cass never thought he would fall for anyone again until he got involved with Nicole Love. The two became engaged, and originally planned on having a double wedding alongside Felicia and her then-fiancé Mitch Blake, but various complications delayed Cass and Nicole's wedding. The biggest complication was when Felicia went on trial for the murder of Jason Frame, with Cass as her defense attorney. The trial was agonizing for Cass, Felicia and many others, and despite Cass's better efforts, Felicia was ultimately found guilty and went to jail. Right before Cass and Nicole were finally to be married, Cass crossed paths with eccentric detective, Frankie Frame, Jason's niece, who proved Nicole had committed the murder. As much as Cass didn't want to believe it, it all came together, and a horrified Cass confronted Nicole about it, and abruptly broke off their engagement. He subsequently went into an even deeper depression, reeling from Nicole's betrayal, and not being fully recovered from Kathleen's death. However, with the help of Felicia, his sister Stacy, and some unwanted assistance from Frankie, he gradually recovered. Nicole subsequently had a nervous breakdown, and attempted to get revenge on Frankie, but eventually was institutionalized.

At first, Cass and Frankie did not like each other (similar to his early relationship with Kathleen). However they came to find they had a lot in common, and although they encountered several obstacles along the way, including the return of Cecile, whom Cass briefly succumbed to, Cass and Frankie fell madly in love. A few months after they married, Cass discovered Kathleen was alive, when she returned to town, to check in on her cousin Jake, who was comatose at the time—she had concealed her survival to save Cass's life from shadowy criminal forces led by Carl Hutchins. His marriage to Frankie was now invalid and he had to choose between his two wives. Still in the grip of his passion for Kathleen, and knowing she needed him more because of the danger she was in, Cass chose her over Frankie. Frankie discovered she was pregnant shortly after splitting with Cass, but chose not to tell him. She later miscarried the baby. Cass ultimately chose Frankie, and Kathleen left town (a decision by the writers triggered in part by Julie Osburn, who played Kathleen, once more leaving the show in spite of being asked to stay). They grew closer, but upon finding out about Frankie's miscarriage, the pair hit another rough patch. Cass realized why Frankie had lied to him and forgave her, but Frankie was still reluctant to reunite with him because of his previous abandonment (though she had known for a long time that he was still in love with Kathleen). They eventually managed to reunite and legally marry in a ceremony in Venice surrounded by their loved ones. They honeymooned on the Orient Express.

Not long after the wedding, Frankie found out she was pregnant again. She gave birth their to their beloved daughter Charlotte, nicknamed Charlie. When Charlie was a few months old, it was discovered she had a genetic heart condition. Although surgery to repair her heart was successful, she would forever remain in fragile condition. Cass blamed himself for Charlie's illness and the stress triggered his bipolar disorder. Cass initially refused to accept he was ill, but with the love and support of Frankie and his brother, Morgan, he eventually sought treatment.

Frankie was tragically murdered by the Bay City Stalker. A devastated Cass nearly lost the will to live after Frankie's murder, but had to move on for the sake of his daughter, Charlie. He began a flirtation with Lila Roberts, who was with Matthew Cory, and had a child with him. Once Lila split up with Matthew, she began a relationship with Cass. Cass and Lila married on the last episode of Another World (their union seemingly blessed by Frankie's ghost).

In the end, Cass finally realized that his deepest and most lasting feelings were not for any of his many lovers, but for his daughter. Bay City's ultimate playboy had finally grown up. It was said that while Kathleen had ended his womanizing nature, Frankie had converted him into the loving family man he ultimately became.

In late 1999 (after the cancellation of Another World), Cass began appearing on As the World Turns, initially defending Margo Hughes against charges that she'd murdered Alec Wallace. After Margo was acquitted in early 2000, Cass remained on As the World Turns, frequently interacting with Jake McKinnon (who'd also crossed over to ATWT after Another World ended), and collaborating with his legal colleagues Tom Hughes and Jessica Griffin. The character remained on ATWT through 2002. He then made several appearances on Guiding Light.
