= 8 Eyed Spy =

American no wave band

- Origin: New York City, United States
- Genre: No wave
- Years active: 1979–1980
- Label: Fetish Records (GB)
- Past members: Lydia Lunch; Jim Sclavunos; Michael Paumgardhen; Pat Irwin; George Scott III

8 Eyed Spy was an American no wave band from New York City, consisting of Lydia Lunch (ex-Teenage Jesus and the Jerks and Beirut Slump) and Jim Sclavunos (also ex-Teenage Jesus and Beirut Slump), Michael Paumgardhen, Pat Irwin and George Scott III. The group was active from 1979 to 1980.

== Background ==
8 Eyed Spy played their first New York City show in October 1979 at the Mudd Club. Subsequently, AllMusic qualified 8 Eyed Spy as "a far more overtly musical group than Teenage Jesus and the Jerks".

They covered Bo Diddley's "Diddy Wah Diddy", the swamp rock classic "Run Through the Jungle" by Creedence Clearwater Revival and Jefferson Airplane's "White Rabbit". The band recorded only briefly, releasing one live album, Live, and a self-titled studio album. The band broke up in 1980 after the death of George Scott III.

== Discography ==
Studio albums

- 8 Eyed Spy (Fetish, 1981)

Live albums

- Live (cassette, ROIR, 1981)

Compilation albums

- Lydia Lunch - Hysterie (Widowspeak - 1986)
- 8 Eyed Spy (Atavistic Records, 1997)

Singles

- "Diddy Wah Diddy"/"Dead You Me Beside" (1980)
