= Shotgun Wedding (album) =

Studio album by Rowland S. Howard/Lydia Lunch
- Released: 1991
- Recorded: May 1991
- Studio: Easley Studios, Memphis, Tennessee, United States
- Length: 49:56
- Label: Triple X
- Producer: J. G. Thirlwell

Rowland S. Howard chronology
Honeymoon in Red (1988)	Shotgun Wedding (1991)	Teenage Snuff Film (1999)

Lydia Lunch chronology
Don't Fear the Reaper (1991)	Shotgun Wedding (1991)	Matrikamantra (1997)

Shotgun Wedding is the sole collaborative studio album by Lydia Lunch and Rowland S. Howard. It was released in May 1991, through record label Triple X.

== Track listing ==
All lyrics are written by Lunch, except as noted; all music is composed by Howard, except as noted.

No.	Title	Lyrics	Music	Length
1.	"Burning Skulls"	Jeremy Gluck	Mark Taylor	6:20
2.	"In My Time of Dying"	John Bonham, Jimmy Page, Jones, Robert Plant		5:00
3.	"Solar Hex"	Lunch	Lunch	3:37
4.	"Endless Fall"			3:51
5.	"What Is Memory"	Lunch	Lunch	5:30
6.	"Pigeon Town"			4:59
7.	"Cisco Sunset"			5:47
8.	"Incubator"			5:29
9.	"Black Juju"	Dennis Dunaway	Dunaway	9:21

== Critical reception ==
Professional ratings
Review scores
Source	Rating
AllMusic	4/5 stars
Pitchfork	6.9/10
Q	3/5 stars
Spin Alternative Record Guide	7/10
Trouser Press	favorable

AllMusic called the album an "alternative rock gem" and "one of Lunch's greatest achievements." Record Collector called it "an essential document for darkside dog-walkers, as both a reaffirmation of Howard's innovatory visions and snapshot of one of the last century's great damage-wallowing couples in fetid creative union."

== Personnel ==
- Lydia Lunch – vocals
- Rowland S. Howard – guitar
- Joe Drake – bass guitar
- Brent Newman – drums, tambourine, piano
- Link "Wreckage" Benka – rhythm guitar

Technical

- J. G. Thirlwell – production
- Martin Bisi – mixing engineer
- Steve Martinez – sleeve art direction
- David Anthony – sleeve photography
- Ingrid Roisland – sleeve typesetting

"Thanks to Chris Bohn, Geoff Cox, Vanessa Skantze"
