= Bob Mason (actor) =

British actor (1951–2004)

- Born: Robert William Mason; 29 July 1951; Rochdale, Lancashire, England
- Died: 21 September 2004 (aged 53); Cambridge, Cambridgeshire, England
- Resting place: Cambridge City Crematorium, Cambridge, Cambridgeshire, England
- Occupation: Actor
- Spouse: Janet Mason
- Children: 2

Robert William Mason (29 July 1951 – 21 September 2004) was a British actor and writer, born in Rochdale, Lancashire. Throughout 1976 he played Terry Bradshaw in Coronation Street and later as Sergeant Eddie Slater in The Lakes in 1997. He also had a regular role in Casualty during the early 2000s.

Mason also appeared in The Bill, Felicia's Journey, Doctors, Where the Heart Is, Black Box, The Missing Postman, Between the Lines, Juliet Bravo, Peak Practice, Reach for the Moon, Clocking Off, Teachers, Cutting It, and Dalziel and Pascoe episode "Under World".

During the 1980s he concentrated on writing, scripting the plays Love in Vain and Working Class Hero in 1982 and 1983 respectively. Between 1981 and 1989 he penned scripts for Coronation Street - quite notably making him the only (regular) member of the cast to write for the programme. He died on 21 September 2004 of cancer in Cambridge aged 53. He was survived by wife Janet and two daughters.
