= Bill Rice (actor) =

American actor

- Born: William Rice; October 17, 1931; Vermont, U.S.
- Died: January 23, 2006 (aged 74); Manhattan, New York, U.S.
- Education: Middlebury College
- Occupations: Actor, artist

William Rice (October 17, 1931 – January 23, 2006) was an American actor, artist, and member of the avant-garde art scene in Manhattan's East Village for many years.

== Early life and education ==
He was born in Vermont and graduated from Middlebury College.

== Career ==
After graduating from Middlebury, Rice moved into an apartment on Third Avenue in Manhattan in 1953. A painter, film actor, and an unaffiliated scholar, Bill Rice was one of the central figures in the various bohemian enclaves that gathered and overlapped on the Lower East Side of the 1960s. Among his diverse achievements, Rice worked with noted Gertrude Stein expert Ulla Dydo on Gertrude Stein: The Language That Rises: 1923–1934 (2003), an essential study of the author's writing process, using her notebooks and manuscripts.

== Death ==
Rice died in Manhattan of lung cancer on January 23, 2006.

== Filmography ==
=== Film ===
Year	Title	Role	Notes
1967	Young Americans	—N/a	Documentary
1980	The Offenders	Dr. Moore	
1980	The Trap Door	Fuller Brush Man	
1981	Subway Riders	Mr. Gollstone	
1982	Vortex	Frederick Fields	
1982	Wild Style	TV Producer Party Guest	Uncredited
1984	Decoder	Jaeger	
1984	Doomed Love	Andre	
1985	Where Little Demons Dwell	Stauffer	
1985	Manhattan Love Suicides	The Artist	
1986	Sleepwalk	Man at Elevator	
1987	Her Name Is Lisa	Hargus Beasley	
1987	Thunder Warrior II	Thomas Rupert	
1988	The Big Blue	Arthur	
1988	Landlord Blues	Roth	
1989	Rain	Preacher	
1992	Last Supper	The provider	
1994	Jonas in the Desert	—N/a	Documentary
2003	Coffee and Cigarettes	Bill	
2005	One Last Thing...	Undertaker	

=== Television ===
Year	Title	Role	Notes
1996	Chicago Hope	Patient #1	Episode: "Right to Life"

== Works ==
- by Bill Rice, Evocation I and Evocation II, BOMB Magazine (Fall, 1984)
- by Bill Rice, Travel Sketchbook and Hamburg, 1982, BOMB Magazine (Winter, 1983)
