= Teen Love =

EP by No Trend
- Released: 1983
- Recorded: Inner Ear Studios, March 1983
- Genre: Noise punk, post-hardcore
- Length: 12:37 (7"); 19:43 (12")
- Label: No Trend Records
- Producer: Don Zientara, No Trend

No Trend chronology
Teen Love (1983)	Too Many Humans..... (1983)

Teen Love is the debut extended play by noise rock band No Trend, released as a 7" vinyl in 1983 through their very own No Trend Records. It was reissued in 1984 on 12" vinyl, this time including the two extra tracks "Die" and "Let's Go Crazy". It has been described as "a perfect example of No Trend’s ruthless proclivity towards lizard-cold satire". The album cover was drawn by guitarist Frank Price, but it was credited under the pseudonym Jim Jones.

== Track listing ==
=== 7" Version ===
Side A
No.	Title	Length
1.	"Mass Sterilization Caused By Venereal Disease"	2:39
2.	"Cancer"	2:24

Side B
No.	Title	Length
1.	"Teen Love"	7:31

=== 12" Version ===
Side A
No.	Title	Length
1.	"Mass Sterilization Caused By Venereal Disease"	2:39
2.	"Cancer"	2:24
3.	"Die"	2:26

Side B
No.	Title	Length
1.	"Teen Love"	7:31
2.	"Let's Go Crazy"	4:40

== Personnel ==
- Jeff Mentges - Vocals
- Frank Price - Guitar, Cover Art
- Bob Strasser - Bass
- Michael Salkind - Drums (7" only)
