= Bischofberger =

Bischofberger is a surname. Notable people with the surname include:

- Annemarie Bischofberger (born 1960), Swiss alpine skier
- Bruno Bischofberger (1940–2026), Swiss art dealer and collector
- Erwin Bischofberger (1936–2012), Swedish Jesuit and medical practitioner
- Ivo Bischofberger (born 1958), Swiss politician and jurist
- Marc Bischofberger (born 1991), Swiss freestyle skier
- Norbert Bischofberger (born 1956), Austrian scientist
