= Gordon Stevenson =

American film director

Gordon Stevenson in 1978 on the back cover of the album No New York

poster for Gordon Stevenson's 1980 no wave film Ecstatic Stigmatic: the film with a disease

Gordon Stevenson was an artist, actor, musician and filmmaker who died of AIDS on August 14, 1983, one of the East Village art community's first casualties of the AIDS epidemic.

== Personal life ==
Born on February 5, 1954, in Cornwall, New York, he attended Eckerd College in St. Petersburg, Florida, where he met Arto Lindsay in the 1970s. While a student, he met Mirielle Cervenka (née Mary Kathryn, a.k.a. Spike) and her younger sister Exene Cervenka (née Christine, later of the band X). Gordon and Mirielle married in 1976 and moved to New York City. A well-known figure of the East Village underground, Stevenson was close to such Lower East Side figures as Fun Gallery director Patti Astor and fashion designer Anna Sui. Stevenson's younger brother, Davey Stevenson, bass player in the early 1980s Athens, Georgia band Limbo District, also died of AIDS.

== Music ==
Stevenson and Mirielle were founding members of DNA, though both left to work with Teenage Jesus and the Jerks. Mirielle was the band's manager, while Stevenson became the bass player for Lydia Lunch's band Pre Teenage Jesus and the Jerks and Teenage Jesus and the Jerks between November 1977 to June 1978, one of several No Wave bands featured on the album No New York. Stevenson, with Teenage Jesus and the Jerks, also released music on Charles Ball's Lust/Unlust label, and toured England.

== Film ==
As an actor, he appeared in Michael McClard's 1979 no wave cinema film Alien Portrait, in Eric Mitchell's 1978 film Kidnapped, and again in Mitchell's 1979 film Red Italy. Most notably, Stevenson directed his own no wave film Ecstatic Stigmatic: the film with a disease in 1980. Starring Mirielle Cervenka as Little Rose, Ecstatic Stigmatic also featured performances by Arto Lindsay, Johnny O’Kane, Brenda Bergman and Anita Paltrinieri. The film premiered at the Mudd Club on September 4, 1980.

== AIDS death ==
Stevenson died in August 1983, an early casualty to the AIDS epidemic, not long after his wife, Mirielle, was killed in an auto accident while visiting her sister in Los Angeles and promoting Ecstatic Stigmatic. Cookie Mueller wrote about Stevenson, and quotes a personal letter from him written during his illness, in her book Walking Through Clear Water in a Pool Painted Black, published by Semiotext(e) after her death (also from AIDS, in 1989).

== Recovery of artistic materials ==
In April 2025, the Chunklet Music Preservation Project recovered seven boxes of Stevenson's personal effects, presumed lost since his death in 1983, including unfinished artistic projects, personal writings and artwork, and unpublished mail art by Ray Johnson and Richard C (Craven). The materials had been saved from Stevenson's apartment by his best friend, Anna Sui, and Anthony Robinson, Stevenson's former business partner in JUNK, an edgy costume jewelry design business that specialized in goth, punk, and post-punk designs.
