= More (No Trend album) =

Studio album by No Trend
- Released: 2001
- Recorded: 1987
- Genre: No wave, experimental rock, funk, art rock, ska punk
- Length: 36:13
- Label: Morphius Archives
- Producer: Ken Mora

No Trend chronology
| Tritonian Nash-Vegas Polyester Complex (1986) | More (2001) |

More is the fourth and final studio album by American no wave band No Trend. It was originally recorded in 1987 and was intended to be released through Touch & Go Records, however the label refused to release it, and the band broke up soon after. The album remained unreleased until 2001 after Morphius Archives got the rights to release the record.

== History ==
After the release of Tritonian Nash-Vegas Polyester Complex, No Trend recorded another album in 1987 and gave it to Touch & Go Records to release it. However, after listening to it, the label deemed the record to be "too weird" for a release. Unable to find a record label to release the album, No Trend broke up in 1989. There were many different session musicians who performed on the album, so many, in fact, that the band were unable to list them all in the liner notes for the release.

== Track listing ==
| No. | Title | Length |
|---|---|---|
| 1. | "Intro" | 1:00 |
| 2. | "Fuzzy Dice" | 2:50 |
| 3. | "Sorry I Asked" | 4:10 |
| 4. | "Spank Me (With Your Love Monkey, Baby)" | 5:17 |
| 5. | "Last On Right, Second Row" | 3:00 |
| 6. | "Bel-Pre Declining" | 2:05 |
| 7. | "No Hopus Opus" | 17:52 |
