= Don't Fear the Reaper (EP) =

EP by Clint Ruin and Lydia Lunch
- Released: 1991
- Recorded: B.C., New York and Self Immolation Studios, Brooklyn
- Genre: Industrial
- Length: 16:52
- Label: Big Cat
- Producer: Clint Ruin

J. G. Thirlwell chronology
Butterfly Potion (1990)	Don't Fear the Reaper (1991)	¡Quilombo! (1991)

Lydia Lunch chronology
Drowning in Limbo (1989)	Don't Fear the Reaper (1991)	Shotgun Wedding (1991)

Professional ratings
Review scores
Source	Rating
Allmusic	2.5/5 stars

Don't Fear the Reaper, the second EP by the duo of Clint Ruin (also known as J. G. Thirlwell) and Lydia Lunch, finds the pair taking on classic covers and new songs in equal measure. The 1991 disc's title track is Ruin and Lunch's take on the Blue Öyster Cult hit (the other cover sees them reconfiguring The Beatles).

== Track listing ==
No.	Title	Writer(s)	Length
1.	"Don't Fear the Reaper"	Donald Roeser	5:16
2.	"Clinch"	Lydia Lunch, Clint Ruin	4:24
3.	"Serpentine"	Clint Ruin	3:41
4.	"Why Don't We Do It in the Road?"	Lennon–McCartney	3:31

- "Serpentine" is a vocal version of "Transcendental Moonshine" from Steroid Maximus' ¡Quilombo!.

== Personnel and production ==
- Clint Ruin – Performance, production, recording (2–4), engineering (2–4)
- Lydia Lunch – Performance
- Martin Bisi – Recording (1), engineering (1)
