= A Dozen Dead Roses =

Studio album by No Trend
- Released: 1985
- Recorded: ?
- Genre: No wave, experimental rock, jazz rock
- Length: 37:42
- Label: No Trend Records
- Producer: Don Zientara, No Trend

No Trend chronology
| Too Many Humans..... (1983) | A Dozen Dead Roses (1985) | Tritonian Nash-Vegas Polyester Complex (1986) |

Professional ratings
Review scores
| Source | Rating |
|---|---|
| Allmusic | 3/5 stars |

A Dozen Dead Roses is the second studio album by American post-punk band No Trend, released in 1985 through their very own No Trend Records. The album features a dramatic musical and stylistic shift from previous releases, being more funk influenced when compared to their previous noisy records such as Too Many Humans. The album features Lydia Lunch performing vocals on numerous tracks. The track "For the Fun of It All" originated from their previous release, Too Many Humans.

== History ==
After the release of Too Many Humans, Frank Price and Michael Salkins left the group, leaving Jeff Mentges and Bob Strasser. Mentges would later recruit other musicians to help with the recording of A Dozen Dead Roses. This album features a dramatic change in sound, featuring influences of jazz and funk music. The sudden change in sound has been described as a prank on the fan base they've attained from the release of Too Many Humans. A Dozen Dead Roses is completely out of print, and the possibility of a reissue is unlikely due to the alleged destruction of the original master tapes, which was also thought to be true for Too Many Humans until the latter album was unexpectedly remastered and re-issued in 2020.

== Track listing ==
All lyrics are written by Jeff Mentges, except for "Heartache", which was written by Butch Willis.

Side One
| No. | Title | Length |
|---|---|---|
| 1. | "Karma Nights" | 3:52 |
| 2. | "Your Love" | 5:40 |
| 3. | "Tear You Apart" | 2:36 |
| 4. | "Never Again" | 2:42 |
| 5. | "All of Nothing" | 3:15 |

Side Two
| No. | Title | Length |
|---|---|---|
| 6. | "Good Day Mrs. Hamm" | 3:07 |
| 7. | "For the Fun of It All" | 2:51 |
| 8. | "The Curse" | 3:58 |
| 9. | "Heartache" | 4:48 |
| 10. | "Who's to Say?" | 4:47 |

== Personnel ==
=== Performers ===
- Jeff Mentges (as Jefferson Scott) - Vocals
- Lydia Lunch - Vocals (Tracks 2, 3, 8, and 10)
- Danny "Spidako" Demetro - Keyboards
- Bob Strasser (as Robert "Smokeman" Marymont) - Bass
- Dean Evangelista - Guitar
- Benard Demassy - Saxophone
- Ken Rudd - Drums

=== Production ===
- Don Zientara - Recording, Mixing
- No Trend - Music, Recording
- Dean Evangelista - Photography
