= Too Many Humans =

Too Many Humans.....

Studio album by No Trend
- Released: November 1983
- Genre: Noise rock, post-hardcore, no wave, post-punk
- Length: 36:06
- Label: No Trend Records
- Producer: Don Zientara, No Trend

No Trend chronology
Teen Love (1983)	Too Many Humans..... (1983)	A Dozen Dead Roses (1985)

Too Many Humans..... is the debut studio album by the American noise rock band No Trend, released through their own No Trend Records in November 1983 on vinyl format. The album is known for its brash, misanthropic lyrics, as evident on tracks such as "Reality Breakdown" and "Mindless Little Insects". It has been described as "nightmarish in all the right ways" and was said to have been influenced by Flipper and Public Image Ltd. The title track would serve as inspiration for Godflesh during the recording of their 1988 album Streetcleaner.

The album was long thought to never be reissued due to the supposed destruction of the original master tapes. However, on May 29, 2020, Drag City released a box set reissue and remaster of the album, along with both versions of Teen Love.

== Music and lyrics ==
The album has been described as violent, misanthropic, noisy, and mean-spirited. Most lyrics mock punk subculture and the social normalities of human life; such as marriage, fashion, and so on. As vocalist Jeff Mentges mentioned in an interview:

...I've always been confused by why what music you listen to would dictate what kind of clothes you wear or what color your hair is. If there's a philosophy in the music you like, you can live by that, but I don't see why you have to be part of a clique, a scene, a movement.

The music heavily centers around Jack Anderson's basslines, while Frank Price's guitar riffs are mostly composed of high pitched guitar feedback. The closer track, "Happiness Is...", features multiple different looped sound samples, layered over a funk-influenced instrumental. The song "For the Fun of It All" would later be rerecorded for the band's follow-up album A Dozen Dead Roses.

== Track listing ==
Side No
No.	Title	Length
1.	"Family Style"	3:12
2.	"Blow Dry"	5:00
3.	"Reality Breakdown"	3:58
4.	"Kiss Ass to Your Peer Group"	3:46
5.	"Fashion Tips for the 80's"	1:36
6.	"Do as You're Told"	1:06

Side Trend
No.	Title	Length
7.	"Too Many Humans"	3:53
8.	"For the Fun of It All"	2:32
9.	"Mindless Little Insects"	4:11
10.	"Happiness Is..."	6:58

== Personnel ==
- Jeff Mentges – Vocals
- Jack Anderson – Bass
- Frank Price – Guitar
- Greg Miller – Drums
