= Brent Collins =

American actor (1941–1988)

- Born: October 31, 1941; Plainville, Kansas, U.S.
- Died: January 6, 1988 (aged 46); New York City, U.S.
- Occupation: Actor

Brent Collins (October 31, 1941 – January 6, 1988) was an American actor who played the role of Mr. Big in the daytime soap opera As the World Turns from 1982 to 1983, and Wallingford on Another World, from 1984 until his death.

On Another World, the Wallingford character was a friend and confidante of Felicia Gallant (Linda Dano) and Cass Winthrop (Stephen Schnetzer). These three characters were given much screen time in the mid-1980s, and gave Collins the highest level of fame he experienced in his career. Originally scheduled to appear on the show for four weeks, the character's popularity resulted in a four-year stint that included a return from the dead. He also was a guest-star on shows such as Spenser: For Hire, The Golden Girls, and The Streets of San Francisco.

Collins, a dwarf, was diagnosed with Marfan syndrome, which typically causes above-average height. Late in 1987, Collins grew rapidly from his short stature, which led to his fatal heart attack. This situation is rare, and few cases have been documented in medical records. Another World acknowledged Collins's death by depicting Wallingford's funeral and by featuring Dano and Schnetzer speaking out-of-character about Collins and his death.
