= Queen of Siam (Lydia Lunch album) =

Studio album by Lydia Lunch
- Released: February 9, 1980
- Recorded: 1979
- Studio: Blank Tape Studios, New York City, New York, United States
- Genre: No wave; punk jazz; post punk
- Length: 31:38
- Label: ZE
- Producer: Bob Blank; Lydia Lunch

Lydia Lunch chronology
Queen of Siam (1980)	The Agony Is the Ecstacy (1982)

Professional ratings
Review scores
Source	Rating
AllMusic	4.5/5 stars
Robert Christgau	B+
Spin Alternative Record Guide	8/10

Queen of Siam is the debut solo album by American artist Lydia Lunch, released on February 9, 1980, by record label ZE. It features Jack Ruby on bass, Douglas Bowne on drums, and Pat Irwin on saxophone, piano and everything else. The Billy Ver Planck Orchestra (Jazz for Playboys, Jazz for Playgirls) perform on four of the tracks.

== Track listing ==
Side A
No.	Title	Writer(s)	Length
1.	"Mechanical Flattery"	Lydia Lunch	2:46
2.	"Gloomy Sunday"	Sam M. Lewis, Rezső Seress	2:57
3.	"Tied and Twist"	Lydia Lunch	2:55
4.	"Spooky"	Buddy Buie, James Cobb, Harry Middlebrooks, Jr., Mike Shapiro	2:40
5.	"Los Banditos"	Lydia Lunch	3:10

Side B
No.	Title	Writer(s)	Length
1.	"Atomic Bongos"	Pat Irwin, Lydia Lunch	2:17
2.	"Lady Scarface"	Lydia Lunch	3:12
3.	"A Cruise to the Moon"	Lydia Lunch	3:54
4.	"Carnival Fat Man"	Lydia Lunch	2:11
5.	"Knives in the Drain"	Frank Grant, Lydia Lunch	4:00
6.	"Blood of Tin"	Lydia Lunch	1:09

== Personnel ==
- Lydia Lunch – vocals, guitar on "Tied and Twist" and "Carnival Fat Man", piano on "Carnival Fat Man", arrangements, production
- Dougie Bowne – drums
- Pat Irwin – backing vocals, instruments, arrangement
- Robert Quine – guitar on "Lady Scarface", "A Cruise to the Moon", "Knives in the Drain" and "Blood of Tin"
- Jack Ruby (George Scott III) – bass guitar
- J. Billy Ver Planck – arrangements with Billy Ver Planck Orchestra on "Lady Scarface", "A Cruise to the Moon", "Knives in the Drain" and "Blood of Tin"

Technical

- Bob Blank – production, mixing, recording
- Michael Zilkha – executive producer
- George DuBose – photography
