= Hysterie =

Compilation album by Lydia Lunch
- Released: 1986
- Recorded: 1976–1986
- Genre: No wave
- Label: Widowspeak

Lydia Lunch chronology
The Drowning of Lucy Hamilton (1985)	Hysterie (1986)	Honeymoon in Red (1987)

Professional ratings
Review scores
Source	Rating
AllMusic	3/5 stars
Spin Alternative Record Guide	9/10
Trouser Press	favorable

Hysterie is a compilation album by American singer-songwriter Lydia Lunch, released in 1986 by record label Widowspeak. It collects recordings Lunch made early in her career with several different groups.

== Track listing ==
No.	Title	Artist (date)	Length
1.	"Red Alert"	Teenage Jesus and the Jerks (Live at C.B.G.B.'s 1978)	0:21
2.	"Orphans"	Teenage Jesus and the Jerks (1977)	2:24
3.	"The Closet"	Teenage Jesus and the Jerks (1977)	3:47
4.	"Burning Rubber"	Teenage Jesus and the Jerks (Live at C.B.G.B.'s 1978)	1:38
5.	"I Woke Up Dreaming"	Teenage Jesus and the Jerks (1977)	3:02
6.	"Freud in Flop"	Teenage Jesus and the Jerks (Live at C.B.G.B.'s 1978)	0:42
7.	"Baby Doll"	Teenage Jesus and the Jerks (Live at C.B.G.B.'s 1978)	1:32
8.	"Race Mixing"	Teenage Jesus and the Jerks (Live at C.B.G.B.'s 1978)	1:01
9.	"Crown of Thorns"	Teenage Jesus and the Jerks (1980)	0:42
10.	"Red Alert"	Teenage Jesus and the Jerks (1981)	0:24
11.	"Try Me"	Beirut Slump (1981)	1:58
12.	"Staircase"	Beirut Slump (1981)	2:38
13.	"I Am the Lord Jesus"	Beirut Slump (1981)	0:53
14.	"Case No. 14"	Beirut Slump (1993)	2:25
15.	"See Pretty"	Beirut Slump (1993)	2:44
16.	"G-I Blue"	Beirut Slump (1994)	0:56
17.	"Tornado Warnings"	Beirut Slump (1994)	1:16
18.	"Sidewalk"	Beirut Slump (1996)	2:54
19.	"Swamp"	8-Eyed Spy (1996)	0:51
20.	"Run Thru the Jungle"	8-Eyed Spy (1999)	5:29
21.	"Motor Oil Shanty"	8-Eyed Spy (2002)	2:30
22.	"Love Split With Blood"	8-Eyed Spy (1999)	2:04
23.	"Ran Away Dark"	8-Eyed Spy (2002)	1:51
24.	"Diddy Wah Diddy"	8-Eyed Spy (1999)	2:18
25.	"Lazy in Love"	8-Eyed Spy (2002)	2:53
26.	"Dead Me You Beside"	8-Eyed Spy (1999)	3:40
27.	"I Fell in Love With a Ghost"	w/Rowland S. Howard (2002)	6:59
28.	"As She Weeps"	w/Sort Sol (1999)	5:31
29.	"Der Karibische Western"	w/Die Haut (2002)	7:57

== Personnel ==
- Birrer – photography
- Gary Hobish – mastering
- Lydia Lunch – vocals

== Charts ==
Chart (1987)	Peak position
UK Indie Chart	12
