= Diddy Wah Diddy =

1956 single by Bo Diddley

Single by Bo Diddley
- B-side: "I'm Looking for a Woman"
- Released: 1956
- Recorded: November 10, 1955
- Studio: Universal Recording Corp. (Chicago)
- Genre: Rhythm and blues; Chicago blues
- Length: 2:28
- Label: Checker 832
- Songwriters: Willie Dixon, Ellas McDaniel
- Producers: Leonard Chess, Phil Chess

Bo Diddley singles chronology
"Pretty Thing" (1955)	"Diddy Wah Diddy" (1956)	"Who Do You Love?" (1956)

Official audio
- "Diddy Wah Diddy" on YouTube

"Diddy Wah Diddy" is a song written by Willie Dixon and Ellas McDaniel, known as Bo Diddley, and recorded by the latter in 1956. (The song shares only its title with Blind Blake's song "Diddie Wah Diddie" recorded in 1929.) Over the years, the Bo Diddley song has been covered by many bands and artists, including the Astronauts, Captain Beefheart and his Magic Band, the Remains, the Twilights, Taj Mahal, the Sonics, the Fabulous Thunderbirds, Ty Segall Band, and the Blues Band among others.

== Original version by Bo Diddley ==
"Diddy Wah Diddy" was Bo Diddley's fourth single release on Checker Records, and was released in early 1956. The song was recorded on November 10, 1955 at Universal Recording Corporation in Chicago, Illinois. The recording featured The Moonglows on backing vocals, Willie Dixon on bass, Jody Williams along with Bo Diddley on guitar, Clifton James on drums, Jerome Green playing the maracas, and Little Willie Smith on harmonica.

Lyrically, the song makes mention of the mythical town of Diddy Wah Diddy. It was not unusual in the early part of the 20th century for African Americans in the southern states (particularly in Florida) to speak of various mythical cities and countries such as Beluthahatchie, Ginny Gall, Diddy Wah Diddy and West Hell as if they were real. Of all the imaginary locations that were in common usage at the time, folklorist and ethnomusicologist Benjamin A. Botkin has noted that Diddy Wah Diddy was "the largest and best known of the Negro mythical places." It was commonly believed that in Diddy Wah Diddy food could be found in abundance, the townsfolk did not have to work, and people and animals had no concerns. Dixon and McDaniel's song is sung from the point of view of a man whose lover lives in this mythical location, as evidenced by such lines as...

She loves her man, just is a pity
Crazy 'bout my gal in Diddy Wah Diddy

Ain't no town, and it ain't no city
But oh, how they love in Diddy Wah Diddy

The song is often confused with Blind Blake's similarly titled 1928 song, "Diddie Wa Diddie", which was also covered by various bands and artists mostly under the name "Diddy Wah Diddy".

== Captain Beefheart and his Magic Band version ==
"Diddy Wah Diddy"

Single by Captain Beefheart and his Magic Band
- B-side: "Who Do You Think You're Fooling"
- Released: March 1966
- Recorded: January 1966, Sunset Sound Recorders, Hollywood, California
- Genre: Blues rock
- Length: 2:22
- Label: A&M 794
- Songwriters: Willie Dixon, Ellas McDaniel
- Producer: David Gates

Captain Beefheart and his Magic Band singles chronology
"Diddy Wah Diddy" (1966)	"Moonchild" (1966)

Captain Beefheart and his Magic Band recorded a blues rock version of the track, produced by David Gates (later the leader of Bread), in January 1966 at Sunset Sound Recorders studio in Hollywood, California. The song was the band's first single, released on the A&M label in March of that year. Some copies of the single incorrectly credit the songwriter as "A. Christensen". The song soon gained interest and became a regional hit, with the band promoting it in May, on the TV show Where the Action Is, in a mimed segment filmed on a California beach.

Captain Beefheart and his Magic Band personnel

- Don Van Vliet – vocals, harmonica
- Doug Moon – guitar
- Alex Snouffer – drums
- Jerry Handley – bass guitar
- Richard Hepner – guitar

== Other cover versions ==
The first known cover of the song was by the Colorado-based rock band The Astronauts, on their RCA album The Astronauts Orbit Kampus, in 1964.

Around the same time as the Captain Beefheart version, in mid-1966, the Remains, from Boston, released a garage rock version of the song which became a hit in the East Coast charts.

The Sonics covered the song as a garage rock version around 1966, and it was included in the 1991 release of Maintaining My Cool and the 2004 Sundazed reissue of the album Introducing the Sonics.

Two Australian bands, The Twilights, and Mike Furber and the Bowery Boys, covered the song, again in 1966. Another Australian band, Running Jumping Standing Still, recorded a version in 1967, which charted at no. 13 in Melbourne.

A cover by blues rock band The Fabulous Thunderbirds appeared on their 1982 album T-Bird Rhythm.

A garage rock cover of "Diddy Wah Diddy" was recorded by the Ty Segall Band for their 2012 album Slaughterhouse.

8 Eyed Spy (Lydia Lunch) released a version in 1980.

Tom Petty and the Heartbreakers covered the song in a 1997 rendition of the track, available on their live compilation album The Live Anthology.

== Other mentions ==
- Blind Blake's earlier, same-titled song "Diddie Wah Diddie" (see above) is referenced on the first issue cover of Robert Crumb's Zap Comix, where a woman quotes the song's racy chorus "I wish somebody would tell me what diddy-wah-diddy means" to Crumb's Mr. Natural, who responds, "If you don't know by now, lady, don't MESS with it!"
- The version by Ty Segall Band is featured on the soundtrack of Grand Theft Auto V on Vinewood Boulevard Radio.
- In "Mad Dogs and Servicemen", a third-season episode of M*A*S*H, Radar refers to "Diddy Wah Diddy" as one of his favorite records. This is an anachronism, as the Korean War ended in 1953 and "Diddy Wah Diddy" was not recorded until 1955.
- In Poul Anderson's novel Operation Chaos, Diddy-Wah-Diddy is a place in the Hell universe.
