= G. H. Hovagimyan =

American performance artist

G. H. Hovagimyan (aka Gerry Hovagimyan) is an American experimental cross-media, new media art and performance artist who lives and works in New York City.

== Formation and early work ==
Hovagimyan was born 1950 in Plymouth, Massachusetts. In 1972, he received a B.F.A. from the University of the Arts in Philadelphia, Pennsylvania and received an M.A. from New York University in 2005. He has been a professor at the School of Visual Arts in the MFA Computer Arts Department. He was one of the first artists in New York to start working in Internet Art in 1993 with pioneering online artists groups such as The Thing, Artnet, and Rhizome.

Control Designators

From 1973 to 1986, Hovagimyan was involved in the SoHo and Lower East Side underground art scene. His first solo exhibition, a conceptual art show at 112 Workshop at 112 Greene Street in 1973, was titled Control Designators that used a system based on Jean Piaget's theory of child development as opposed to adult intellectual development. Thus, the basic matrix of the artist's code was related to the progression from undifferentiated surface topology through geometric triangulation to the linear sense of language experienced in reading."

Hovagimyan worked with artist Gordon Matta-Clark as an assistant on several projects, including Days' End, Conical Intersect, Working Man's Arch, and Underground Explorations. In 1974, during the video-performance series at 112 Workshop, he performed opposite Spaulding Gray in Richard Serra's video A Prisoner's Dilemma.

== East Village, Punk, The Public, and Working with the Internet ==
Much of Hovagimyan's early work was ephemeral in nature. It involved performance art, text and language works, and temporary installations in galleries. A word piece, Tactics for Survival in the New Culture, was exhibited in The Manifesto Show (1979) that was organized by the artist collective Colab. This particular piece became the basis for one of his first online hypertext works in 1993.

Hovagimyan showed in several group exhibitions organized by Jean Dupuy, a French Fluxus artist living in New York at 405 E. 13th Street.

== Media and New Media ==
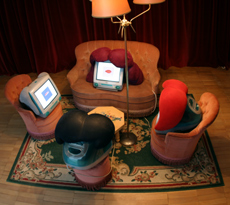
A Soa(p Op)era for iMacs

In the early 1990s, Hovagimyan started working in media art and new media art. Some of the pieces involve using a combination of photographs and text, often mimicking advertising. In May 1994, his twenty billboard project for the New York public art organization Creative Time project called Hey Bozo...Use Mass Transit received press for its confrontation text calling drivers stuck in traffic clowns, attracting the attention of Larry Harmon, who owned the rights to the name Bozo and sued him over copyright infringement. The work was seen on several newscasts such as Good Day New York and the NBC Nightly News. It was written up in the New York Post, New York Daily News, and New York Times, among other places. A telephone interview with the artist and a report on the project was distributed over the AP newswire.

Around the same time Hovagimyan began working with computers and the internet. One of the earliest internet artists, his first pieces, BKPC, Art Direct and Faux Conceptual Art were written about in the art magazines Art in America and Art Press. He also hosted an internet radio/TV talk show called Art Dirt, broadcast by the 1990s early online live streaming service Pseudo. The first online new media art radio program of its kind, Art Dirt is part of the Walker Art Center's Digital Studies Archives collection.

== Videos and Hacked Interfaces ==
In the 2000s, Hovagimyan increasingly created work using videos and hacked interfaces, often in collaboration with the French media artist Peter Sinclair. His collaborative works with Sinclair include A Soa(p) Opera for Laptops/iMacs, Shooter, and Rant/Rant Back/Back Rant. Shooter, an immersive sound and laser installation was developed at Eyebeam Atelier as part of its Artist in Residence program.Rant/Rant Back is an experimental performance work created in 2003 using a special interface programmed by Sinclair to sample voice input, manipulate it, and send it back into a general audio mix in real time. Hovagimyan performed in the persona of a borderline schizoid personality rambling about a confused mixture of media, news, information, gossip, and paranoid rumors, referencing actual news articles and posted in a blog.

Shooter

== Augmented reality ==
Since 2014, in addition to continuing hacked interface works such as 3D Karaoke, which used Kinect cameras to program karaoke performances generating live 3D videos of singers, Hovagimyan began using augmented reality as a medium, producing several series of paintings and sculptural installations triggering three-dimensional augmentations when viewed through handheld devices such as iPhones and iPads. These AR pieces, including AR Paintings, Teenage Zombie Avatars, and four Space Paintings were exhibited at Radiator Gallery in Long Island City and in solo exhibitions at the Brooklyn gallery of TRANSFER in 2014 and the Narrowsburg gallery of the Delaware Valley Art Alliance in 2019. His series of Fibonacci Spirals, large-scale sculptural installations used the Fibonacci series to iterate curving spiral slides, were constructed in Galilee, Pennsylvania, Valparaiso, Chile, and Flint, Michigan in 2014 and 2015.
