= In Limbo (EP) =

EP by Lydia Lunch
- Released: 1984
- Recorded: November 1982
- Studio: Surf Sound, New York City, United States
- Length: 31:27
- Label: Doublevision

Lydia Lunch chronology
13.13 (1982)	In Limbo (1984)	The Drowning of Lucy Hamilton (1985)

In Limbo is an EP by American rock musician Lydia Lunch, released in 1984 on Doublevision. It is largely a collaboration with Thurston Moore.

== Reception ==
Professional ratings
Review scores
Source	Rating
Spin Alternative Record Guide	4/10

AllMusic called the EP "something of a return to the nearly atonal cacophony of Lunch's earliest work, but with greater delicacy and subtlety thanks largely to collaborator Thurston Moore's skill at varied and intriguing sonic moods". Billboard wrote of the EP: "Add deathbed vocals to what sounds like a bad soundtrack to an even worse horror flick and you've got Lydia Lunch's latest faintly interesting, very depressing, poetic effort". Head Heritage described it as "one of Lunch's strongest statements. A difficult, overlooked but vital gem".

== Track listing ==
Side one
No.	Title	Lyrics	Music	Length
1.	"I Wish... I Wish"	Lydia Lunch	Thurston Moore	5:24
2.	"Friday Afternoon"	Lydia Lunch	Thurston Moore	4:11
3.	"1000 Lies"	Lydia Lunch	Thurston Moore	4:49

Side two
No.	Title	Lyrics	Music	Length
1.	"Some Boys"	Lydia Lunch	Murray Mitchell	4:49
2.	"Still Burning"	Rowland S. Howard	Rowland S. Howard	6:02
3.	"What Did You Do"	Lydia Lunch	Thurston Moore	6:12

== Personnel ==
Musicians

- Richard Edson – drums
- Kristian Hoffman – piano
- Lydia Lunch – vocals
- Thurston Moore – bass guitar
- Pat Place – guitar
- Jim Sclavunos – saxophone

Production and technical

- Donny Bill – engineering
- Dan Dryden – engineering
- George N. Carstens, Lydia Lunch – cover design
- Nan Goldin – photography

== Charts ==
Chart (1984)	Peak position
UK Indie Chart	19
