= No New York =

1978 compilation album by various artists

Compilation album by various artists
- Released: 1978
- Recorded: Spring 1978
- Studios: Big Apple, New York City
- Genre: No wave
- Length: 43:46
- Label: Antilles
- Producer: Brian Eno

No New York is a compilation album of no wave music released in 1978 on Antilles, curated by Brian Eno. Although it only contains songs by four different artists, it has been considered important in defining and documenting the scene and movement, with the name "no wave" being influenced by that of the album according to some accounts.

== Background and production ==
Early in 1978, New York's Artists Space hosted a five night underground no wave music festival, organized by artists Michael Zwack and Robert Longo, that featured ten local bands; including Rhys Chatham's the Gynecologists, Communists, Glenn Branca's Theoretical Girls, Terminal, Chatham's Tone Death (performing his composition for electric guitars Guitar Trio) and Branca's Daily Life (with Barbara Ess, Paul McMahon and Christine Hahn). The final two days of the show featured DNA and the Contortions on Friday, followed by Mars and Teenage Jesus and the Jerks on Saturday. English musician and producer Brian Eno, who had originally come to New York to produce the second Talking Heads album More Songs About Buildings and Food, was in the audience. Impressed by what he saw and heard, and advised by Diego Cortez to do so, Eno was convinced that this movement should be documented and proposed the idea of a compilation album with himself as a producer.

When Eno recorded No New York, some of the sessions were done without much of the stylized production he was known for on other artists' albums. James Chance stated that the Contortions tracks were "done totally live in the studio, no separation between the instruments, no overdubs, just like a document." In 1979, Eno stated in his lecture "The Studio as Compositional Tool" that, "On 'Helen Thormdale' [sic] from the No New York album, I put an echo on the guitar part's click, and used that to trigger the compression on the whole track, so it sounds like helicopter blades."

== Release ==
No New York was released in 1978 by Antilles Records. The original pressing of the LP contained a lyric sheet that was intentionally printed on the inside of the record sleeve, which forced the owner to have to tear apart the sleeve to read the lyrics. The album was first reissued on CD by Island Records in Japan. It was reissued in 2005 by Lilith Records on vinyl and digipak form on CD.

== Critical reception and legacy ==
Professional ratings
Review scores
Source	Rating
AllMusic	4.5/5 stars
Christgau's Record Guide	B+
Pitchfork	8.3/10
Q	4/5 stars
Spin Alternative Record Guide	8/10

Critic Richard C. Walls, writing for Creem, described No New York as the most "ferociously avant-garde and aggressively ugly music since Albert Ayler puked all over my brain back in – what? – 64" and stated "If you're intrepid enough to want to hear this stuff (a friend, 3/4 into the first side, complained that the music was painful – she wasn't referring to any abstract reaction, she was grimacing), be advised that Antilles is a division of Island Records, which ain't exactly Transamerica Corp. You'll probably have to make a little effort to procure it, because there's no way it's going to come to you."

On February 17, 1979, Pete Silverton of Sounds reviewed the album, excerpt: "'NO WAVE' is the rather unoriginal tag given to a loose group of new bands which have emerged in New York since the original CBGB's explosion [...] To date the best-known No Wave artefact is the No New York compilation on Antilles, the Island subsidiary, which contains hasty sessions of four bands — DNA, the Contortions, Teenage Jesus and the Jerks and Mars. I spoke to three of the bands and they all thought the album sucked and that producer Eno should have stayed home. Nor have any of them got much time for the No New tag itself. As James Chance of the Contortions growled with beautifully weedy menace, "I wish I could get my hand on whoever made it up".

No New York is mentioned on the back cover of the Fall's 1979 studio album Dragnet.

Retrospective reviews of the album have been positive. Todd Kristel of AllMusic stated that "this seminal album remains the definitive document of New York's no wave movement", but also echoed Walls's statement from 1978, saying, "Some listeners may be fascinated by the music on No New York while others may find it unbearable".

In 2007, Blender placed the album at number 65 on their list of "The 100 Greatest Indie-Rock Albums Ever".

== Track listing ==
Side A
No.	Title	Writer(s)	Artist	Length
1.	"Dish It Out"	James Chance	Contortions	3:17
2.	"Flip Your Face"	Chance	Contortions	3:13
3.	"Jaded"	Chance	Contortions	3:49
4.	"I Can't Stand Myself"	James Brown; arranged by Contortions	Contortions	4:52
5.	"Burning Rubber"	Lydia Lunch	Teenage Jesus and the Jerks	1:45
6.	"The Closet"	Lunch	Teenage Jesus and the Jerks	3:53
7.	"Red Alert"	Lunch	Teenage Jesus and the Jerks	0:34
8.	"I Woke Up Dreaming"	Lunch	Teenage Jesus and the Jerks	3:10

Side B
No.	Title	Writer(s)	Artist	Length
9.	"Helen Fordsdale"	Nancy Arlen, China Burg, Mark Cunningham, Sumner Crane	Mars	2:30
10.	"Hairwaves"	Arlen, Burg, Cunningham, Crane	Mars	3:43
11.	"Tunnel"	Arlen, Burg, Cunningham, Crane	Mars	2:41
12.	"Puerto Rican Ghost"	Arlen, Burg, Cunningham, Crane	Mars	1:08
13.	"Egomaniac's Kiss"	Robin Crutchfield, Arto Lindsay	D.N.A.	2:11
14.	"Lionel"	Crutchfield, Lindsay	D.N.A.	2:07
15.	"Not Moving"	Crutchfield, Lindsay	D.N.A.	2:40
16.	"Size"	Crutchfield, Lindsay	D.N.A.	2:13

== Personnel ==
Contortions

- James Chance – saxophone, vocals
- Don Christensen – drums
- Jody Harris – guitar
- Pat Place – slide guitar
- George Scott III – bass
- Adele Bertei – Acetone organ

Teenage Jesus and the Jerks

- Lydia Lunch – guitar, vocals
- Gordon Stevenson – bass
- Bradley Field – drums

Mars

- Sumner Crane – guitar, vocals
- China Burg – guitar, vocals
- Mark Cunningham – bass, vocals
- Nancy Arlen – drums

D.N.A.

- Arto Lindsay – guitar, vocals
- Robin Crutchfield – organ, vocals
- Ikue Mori – drums

Additional personnel

- Brian Eno – producer, cover design, cover photo
- Kurt Munkasci – engineer
- Vishek Woszcyk – engineer
- Roddy Hui – assistant engineer
- Steven Keister – cover design

== Release history ==
Region	Date	Label	Format	Catalog
United States	1978	Antilles Records	LP	AN-7067
United States	2005	Lilith Records	Digipak CD	LR102

== See also ==
- Yes L.A. – a punk rock compilation EP issued in response to this album
- New York Noise – another compilation album featuring artists from the no wave scene
