= Lydia Lunch =

American singer (born 1959)

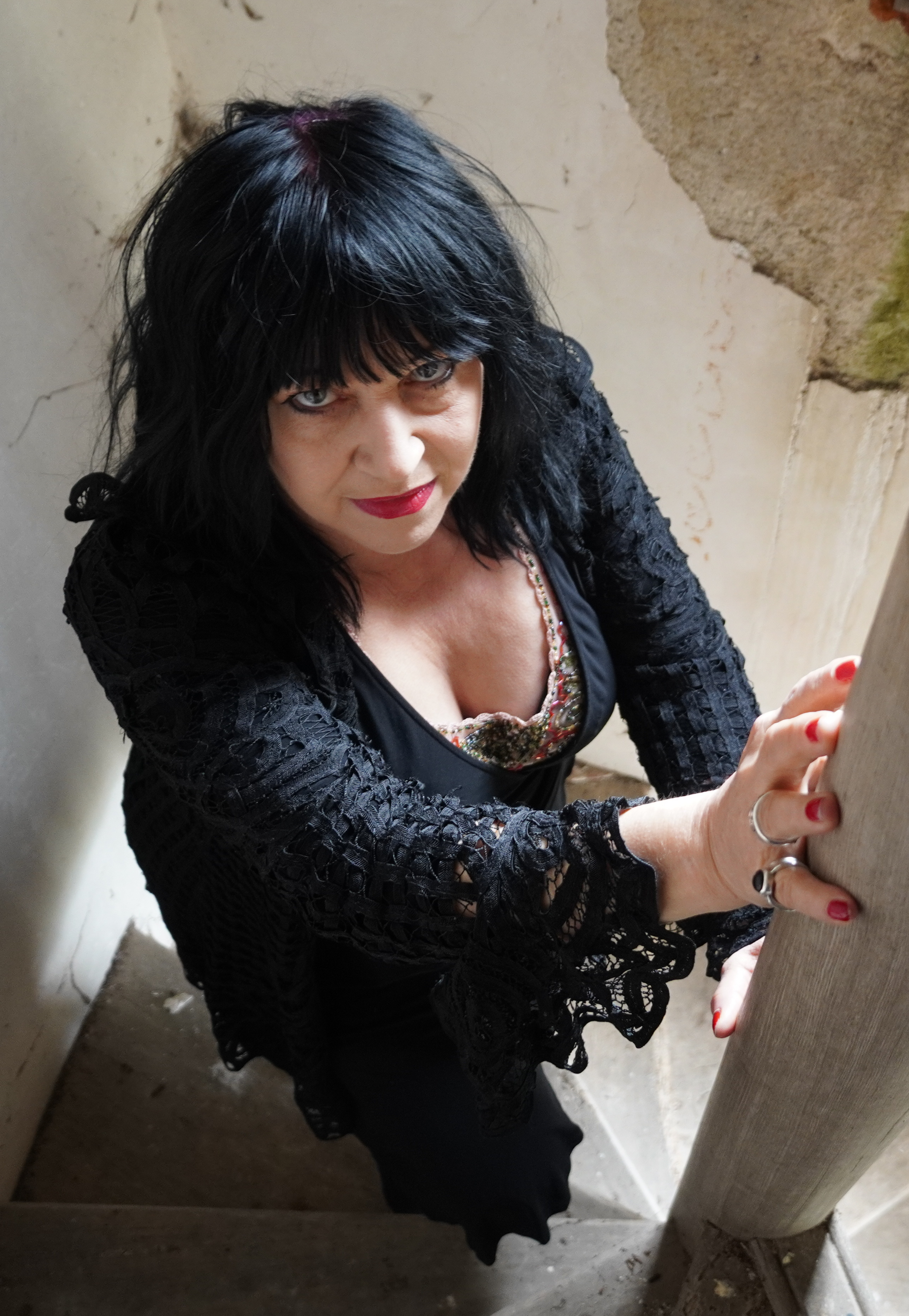
- Lunch in 2019

Background information
- Born: Lydia Anne Koch; June 2, 1959 (age 67); Rochester, New York, U.S.
- Genres: No wave; post-punk; industrial; avant-garde; spoken word
- Occupations: Singer; songwriter; actress; self-empowerment speaker
- Instruments: Vocals; guitar
- Years active: 1976–present
- Labels: ZE; Ruby; Widowspeak Productions; Crippled Dick Hot Wax!; Atavistic; Breakin Beats
- Website: lydia-lunch.net

Lydia Lunch (born Lydia Anne Koch; June 2, 1959) is an American singer, poet, writer, actress and self-empowerment speaker. Her career began during the 1970s New York City no wave scene as the singer and guitarist of Teenage Jesus and the Jerks.

Her work typically features provocative and confrontational noise music delivery and she has maintained an anti-commercial stance, operating independently of major labels and distributors. The Boston Phoenix named Lunch one of the ten most influential performers of the 1990s. Kerrang! named Sonic Youth's "Death Valley '69" featuring Lunch one of "The 50 Most Evil Songs Ever".

== Biography ==
Lunch was born on June 2, 1959, in Rochester, New York, and is of German and Italian descent. She moved to New York City at the age of 16 and eventually moved into a communal household of artists and musicians. After befriending Alan Vega and Martin Rev at Max's Kansas City, she founded the short-lived but influential no-wave band Teenage Jesus and the Jerks, with James Chance. Both Teenage Jesus and the Jerks and the Contortions, Chance's subsequent band, played on the no wave compilation No New York, produced by Brian Eno. Lunch later appeared on two songs on James White and the Blacks album, Off-White. She was in two other short lived bands - Beirut Slump and 8 Eyed Spy - before launching her solo career in 1980. In the mid-1980s, she formed the recording and publishing company "Widowspeak Productions" (also known as just "Widowspeak"), on which she continues to release her own material, from music to spoken word. Two albums published by Lunch's label were released in 2013: Collision Course & Trust The Witch, by Big Sexy Noise (released on Cherry Red), and Retrovirus (released on Interbang Records); both albums are by Lunch's musical projects.

She released her studio album Smoke in the Shadows in November 2004, through Atavistic Records and Breakin Beats, after a six-year break from music. Nels Cline played guitar on the album, which was met with positive reviews by AllMusic, PopMatters, and Tiny Mix Tapes.

In 2009 Lunch formed the band Big Sexy Noise. The group features Lunch on vocals, James Johnston (guitars), Terry Edwards (organ, saxophone), and Ian White (drums). Johnston, White and Edwards are members of the British band Gallon Drunk. A six-track eponymous EP was released on June 1, 2009, through Sartorial Records, and included a cover of Lou Reed's song "Kill Your Sons", as well as "The Gospel Singer", a song co-written with Gordon. The debut, self-titled album, Big Sexy Noise, was released in 2010, followed by Trust The Witch in 2011. For both albums, Lunch and her band completed tours throughout Europe.

In 2010, The Jeffrey Lee Pierce Sessions Project launched We Are Only Riders, the first of a series of four albums featuring Pierce's previously unreleased works-in-progress. The album features interpretations of Pierce's work by friends, collaborators, and admirers, including Lunch. Lunch also contributed to the second album from the project, The Journey is Long, which was released in April 2012.

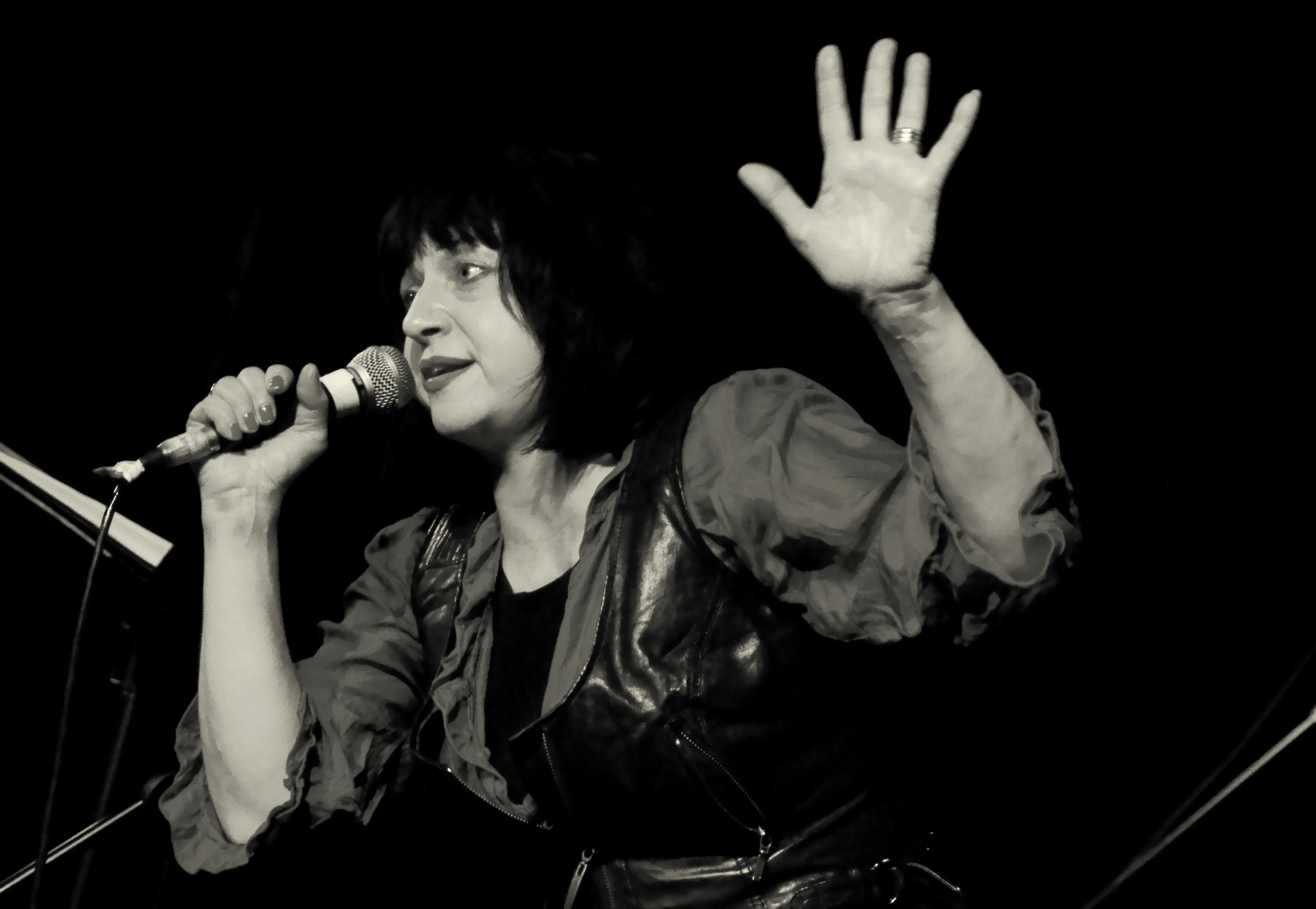
Lydia Lunch performing in 2012

Although the Pierce Sessions Project's third and final album, The Task Has Overwhelmed Us, was due for release in late 2012, the schedule was changed after the release of the second installment. Glitterhouse Records, the label producing the collection, instead released a third album titled Axles & Sockets in May 2014, on which Lunch performs "The Journey Is Long" with Pierce's recordings. The label explained that the third album has become the "penultimate" full-length release of the Project, but did not name the final album, or its release date.

Lunch released the album Retrovirus (also the name of the band Lunch has played with since then) in 2013 on Interbang Records and ugEXPLODE (the vast majority of the album tracks are published by Widowspeak). Together with band members Weasel Walter, Algis Kizys, and Bob Bert, Lunch performed a show following the album's release at the Bowery Electric venue in New York City, in May 2013. In March 2022 the Center for Popular Music (CPM) at Middle Tennessee State University named her the recipient of the CPM Fellows Award. The only previous recipients of this honor were Barry Gibb and Lamont Dozier.

=== Film ===
She appeared in two films by directors Scott B and Beth B. In Black Box (1978) she played a dominatrix, and in Vortex (1981) she played a private detective named Angel Powers. During this time, she also appeared in a number of films by Vivienne Dick, including She Had Her Gun All Ready (1978) and Beauty Becomes The Beast (1979), co-starring with Pat Place. In 2011, Lunch appeared in Mutantes: punk, porn, feminism, a film directed by Virginie Despentes, also featuring Annie Sprinkle and Catherine Breillat. She also wrote, directed, and acted in underground films, sometimes collaborating with underground filmmaker Nick Zedd and photographer Richard Kern.

=== Spoken word ===
Lunch has recorded and performed as a spoken word artist, collaborating with artists such as Exene Cervenka, Henry Rollins, Don Bajema and Hubert Selby Jr. as well as hosting spoken-word performance night "The Unhappy Hour" at the Parlour Club. In 1998 she collaborated with the Italian group Minox (which included Mirco Magnani) with spoken word on the EP U-Turn and in 2001 on the album Downworks.

=== Literature ===
In 1997, Lunch released Paradoxia, a loose autobiography, in which she documented her early life, sexual history, substance abuse and mental health problems. Time Out New York gave it a favorable review, while Bookslut ambiguously concluded "It's to the reader to determine whether Lunch's study goes deeper than that, or if instead, it's a kind of literary and philosophical repetition compulsion, a reprisal of greatest hits from male nihilists, sexual adventurers and chroniclers of deviance." PopMatters called it a "brutal but boring and predictable circus, about which Lunch shows no emotions. Only fatigue seems to have given her pause."

Additionally, Lunch has authored both traditional books and comix (with graphic novel artist Ted McKeever).

=== Other work ===
In 2013, Lunch ran self-empowerment workshops in locations such as Ojai, California, and Rennes, France. In regard to the Rennes workshop, her inaugural self-empowerment event, Lunch recalled: "Every day people would come in that would have to get a hug. I felt like mother India." In April of that year, Lunch said that she is the producer of the Emilio Cubeiro album Death of an Asshole. In 2014 Lunch shot a series of photographs with Austin, Texas-based artist, Darla Teagarden.

In 2019 Lunch started the podcast The Lydian Spin. Lunch hosts each weekly episode with bassist Tim Dahl.

In 2020, Lunch appeared on the album Against All Logic "2017–2019", by producer Nicolas Jaar.

== Personal life ==
In 2004, she left the United States to live in Barcelona. She returned to the United States in 2017 and lives in Brooklyn.

== Discography ==
=== Solo ===
Albums

- Queen of Siam (1980)
- 13.13 (1981)
- Honeymoon in Red (1987)
- Unearthly Delights (1992)
- Matrikamantra (1997)
- Smoke in the Shadows (2004)
- Retrovirus (live, 2013)
- Urge to Kill (as Lydia Lunch Retrovirus) (2015)

EPs

- Drunk on the Pope's Blood/The Agony Is the Ecstacy (split with the Birthday Party, 1982)
- In Limbo (1984)

Singles

- "No Excuse" (1997)

Compilation albums

- Hysterie (1986)
- Widowspeak (1998)
- Deviations on a Theme (2006)

Video albums

- Willing Victim (The Audience as Whipping Boy) (live in Graz, Austria, 2004)

=== Teenage Jesus and the Jerks ===
EPs

- Pre Teenage Jesus and the Jerks (1979)

Singles

- "Baby Doll" (1979)
- "Orphans" (1979)

Compilation albums

- Teenage Jesus and the Jerks (1979)
- Everything (1995)
- Shut Up and Bleed (2008)

Appears on

- No New York (1978)

=== Beirut Slump ===
- "Try Me" (1979)

=== 8-Eyed Spy ===
Albums

- 8-Eyed Spy (1981; reissued as Luncheone in 1995)
- Live (1981)

Singles

- "Diddy Wah Diddy" (1980)

=== Harry Crews ===
- Naked in Garden Hills (1987)

=== Big Sexy Noise ===
- Big Sexy Noise (2009)
- Trust the Witch (2011)

=== Collaborations ===
- Some Velvet Morning with Rowland S. Howard (EP, 1982)
- The Drowning of Lucy Hamilton with Lucy Hamilton (EP, 1985)
- Heart of Darkness with No Trend (EP, 1985)
- The Crumb with Thurston Moore (EP, 1987)
- Stinkfist with Clint Ruin (EP, 1987)
- Don't Fear the Reaper with Clint Ruin (EP, 1991)
- Shotgun Wedding with Rowland S. Howard (1991)
- Transmutation + Shotgun Wedding Live in Siberia with Rowland S. Howard (1994)
- The Desperate Ones with Glyn Styler (EP, 1997)
- U Turn with Minox (EP, 1998)
- Downworks with Minox (2001)
- Champagne, Cocaïne & Nicotine Stains with Anubian Lights (EP, 2002)
- Touch My Evil with Anubian Lights (CDr, 2006)
- Omar Rodriguez Lopez & Lydia Lunch with Omar Rodriguez-Lopez (EP, 2007)
- Lydia Lunch and Philippe Petit – (2011)
- A Fistful of Desert Blues with Cypress Grove (2014)
- Twin Horses with Cypress Grove (2014) a split album with Spiritual Front
- My Lover the Killer (2016) with Marc Hurtado
- Under the Covers with Cypress Grove (2017)
- Permafrost (Magazine (band)) / Mass Production (Iggy Pop) with The Art Gray Noizz Quintet (10", 2026)

=== Appears on ===
- Off White, James White and the Blacks (1979)
- Der Karibische Western, Die Haut (EP, 1982)
- Thirsty Animal, Einstürzende Neubauten (EP, 1982)
- "Boy-Girl", Sort Sol ( 1983)
- Dagger & Guitar, Sort Sol (1983)
- "Death Valley '69", Sonic Youth (1984)
- A Dozen Dead Roses, No Trend (LP, 1985)
- Death Valley '69, Sonic Youth (EP, 1986)
- King of the Jews, Oxbow (1991)
- 13 Above the Night, My Life with the Thrill Kill Kult (LP, 1993)
- Dirty Little Secrets: Music to Strip By, My Life with the Thrill Kill Kult (LP, 1999)
- Head On, Die Haut (1992)
- Sweat, Die Haut (1992)
- Unhealthy, Lab Report (1994)
- York, The Foetus Symphony Orchestra (1997)
- Brooklyn Bank, Here (1998)
- OperettAmorale (compilation tribute album to Bertolt Brecht, 2005)
- The Impossibility of Silence, Black Sun Productions (2006)
- Ankitoner Metamars, Ankitoner Metamars (2007)
- "Frankie Teardrop", Alan Vega 70th Birthday Limited Edition EP Series (2008)
- We Are Only Riders, The Jeffrey Lee Pierce Sessions Project (2010)
- The Journey Is Long, The Jeffrey Lee Pierce Sessions Project (2012)
- Axels & Sockets, The Jeffrey Lee Pierce Sessions Project (2014)
- Synthetic Love Dream, David Lackner (2014)
- Trouble in Paradise, Drrty Pharms (2017)

== Spoken word ==
- Better an Old Demon Than a New God, Giorno Poetry Systems comp. feat. William S. Burroughs, Psychic TV, Richard Hell and others (1984)
- The Uncensored, solo (1984)
- Hard Rock, solo (split cassette w. Michael Gira / Ecstatic Peace, 1984)
- Oral Fixation, solo (12", 1988)
- Our Fathers Who Aren't in Heaven, w. Henry Rollins, Hubert Selby Jr. and Don Bajema (1990)
- Conspiracy of Women, solo (1990)
- South of Your Border, w. Emilio Cubeiro (1991)
- POW, solo (1992)
- Crimes Against Nature, solo spoken-word anthology (Tripple X/Atavistic, 1994)
- Rude Hieroglyphics, w. Exene Cervenka (Rykodisc, 1995)
- Universal Infiltrators, (Atavistic, 1996)
- Kicks Joy Darkness, feat. Beat Generation writer Jack Kerouac's work performed by other various artists (1997)
- The Devil's Racetrack (2000)
- Flood Stains, w. Juan Azulay (2010)
- Medusa's Bed, w. Zahra Mani & Mia Zabelka (2013)
- Marchesa, solo (Rustblade, 2018)

== Filmography ==
=== Actress ===
- She Had Her Gun All Ready: Directed by Vivienne Dick (1978)
- Guerillere Talks: Directed by Vivienne Dick (1978)
- Rome '78: Directed by Jamie Nares (1978)
- Black Box: Directed by Scott B and Beth B (1978)
- Beauty Becomes the Beast: Directed by Vivienne Dick (1979)
- The Offenders (1979–1980): Directed by Scott B and Beth B
- Liberty's Booty (1980)
- Subway Riders: Directed by Amos Poe (1981)
- The Wild World of Lydia Lunch: Directed by Nick Zedd (1983)
- Like Dawn to Dust: Directed by Vivienne Dick (1983)
- Vortex: Directed by Scott and Beth B (1983)
- Submit to Me: Directed by Richard Kern (1985)
- The Right Side of My Brain: Directed by Richard Kern (1985)
- Fingered: Directed by Richard Kern (1986)
- Hardcore Extended: Richard Kern (includes all movies of R. Kern with L. Lunch) (DVD / Le Chat qui Fume, 2008)
- Barbecue Death Squad from Hell with Penn & Teller (1986)
- Penn & Teller's Cruel Tricks for Dear Friends (1987)
- Mondo New York (1987)
- Invisible Thread: Directed by Bob Balaban (1987)
- Kiss Napoleon Goodbye: Directed by Babeth vanLoo (1990)
- The Road to God Knows Where: Directed by Uli M. Schüppel (1990)
- Thanatopsis: Directed by Beth B (1991)
- Visiting Desire: Directed by Beth B (1996)
- Power of the Word (1996)
- The Heart Is Deceitful Above All Things: Directed by Asia Argento (2004)
- Kill Your Idols: Directed by Scott Crary, also known as S.A. Crary (2004)
- Psychomentsrum (unreleased)
- Godkiller: Walk Among Us (2010): Voice role
- Mutantes: punk, porn, feminism: Directed by Virginie Despentes (2011)
- Autoluminescent: Directed by Richard Lowenstein (2011)
- Blank City: Directed by Celine Danhier (2012)
- Lydia Lunch: The War Is Never Over: Directed by Beth B (2019)

=== Writer ===
- The Right Side of My Brain (1985)
- Fingered (1986)

=== Composer ===
- The Offenders (1980)
- Vortex (1983) (with John Lurie, Adele Bertei, Pat Place, Beth B and Scott B)
- The Right Side of My Brain (1985)
- Goodbye 42nd Street (1986)
- Fingered (1986)
- I Pass for Human (2004)
- Flood stains (2010)
- Disturbtion (2015)

=== Subject ===
- The Wild World of Lydia Lunch (1983)
- Penn & Teller's Cruel Tricks for Dear Friends (1987)
- Put More Blood into the Music (1987)
- The Gun is Loaded (1988–1989)
- The Road to God Knows Where (1990)
- Malicious Intent (1990)
- The Thunder (1992)
- Totem of the Depraved (1996)
- Paradoxia (1998)
- Lady Lazarus: Confronting Lydia Lunch (2000)
- Kiss My Grits: The Herstory of Women in Punk and Hard Rock (2001)
- DIY or Die: How to Survive as an Independent Artist (2002)
- Kill Your Idols (2004)
- "Lydia Lunch, à corps perdu " (2008), directed by Ludovic Cantais

=== Narrator ===
- American Fame Part 1: Drowning River Phoenix, dir. Cam Archer (2004)
- American Fame Part 2: Forgetting Jonathan Brandis, dir. Cam Archer (2005)
- Wild Tigers I Have Known, (Scenes Deleted), dir. Cam Archer (2006)

== Plays ==
(both written, acted, directed and produced with Emilio Cubeiro)

- South of Your Border (1988)
- Smell of Guilt (1990)

== Books ==
- Adulterers Anonymous (1982 with Exene Cervenka)
- AS-FIX-E-8 (1990 with Mike Matthews)
- Bloodsucker (1992 with Bob Fingerman)
- Incriminating Evidence Last Gasp, 1992
- Adulterers Anonymous Last Gasp, 1996
- Toxic Gumbo (1998 with Ted McKeever)
- Paradoxia: A Predator's Diary Creation Books, 1999
- The Gun is Loaded Black Dog Publishing London UK, 2007
- Will Work for Drugs Akashic, 2009
- The Need to Feed: Recipes for Developing a Healthy Obsession with Deeply Satisfying Foods RCS MediaGroup Universe imprint, 2012
- So Real it Hurts, introduction by Anthony Bourdain, Seven Stories Press, 2019
