= The Drowning of Lucy Hamilton =

Soundtrack album by Lydia Lunch and Lucy Hamilton
- Released: 1985
- Recorded: August–October 1984
- Length: 19:33
- Label: Widowspeak

Lydia Lunch chronology
In Limbo (1984)	The Drowning of Lucy Hamilton (1985)	Hysterie (1986)

Professional ratings
Review scores
Source	Rating
The Encyclopedia of Popular Music	3/5 stars
Spin Alternative Record Guide	6/10

The Drowning of Lucy Hamilton an album by Lydia Lunch and Lucy Hamilton. It was released in 1985 through Widowspeak. It is the soundtrack to the Richard Kern film The Right Side of My Brain.

== Content ==
Trouser Press wrote that the album "consists of eerie instrumentals orchestrated with piano, honking bass clarinet [...] and guitars that sound like they're being played with ice picks and hedge clippers."

== Reception ==
Trouser Press described it as "something rather different for Lunch, and less like background music than most soundtracks." The Rough Guide to Rock called the album "an eerie and twisted instrumental tribute to film noir."

== Track listing ==
All tracks are written by Lucy Hamilton and Lydia Lunch.

Side one
No.	Title	Length
1.	"Emerald Pale Has Disappeared"	5:20
2.	"The Drowning"	1:47
3.	"How Men Die in Their Sleep"	2:24

Side two
No.	Title	Length
1.	"Lucy's Lost Her Head Again"	3:24
2.	"3:20 Thursday Morning"	3:35
3.	"A Quiet Night of Murder in Greenwich, CT"	3:02

== Personnel ==
Musicians

- Lucy Hamilton – guitar, bass clarinet
- Lydia Lunch – guitar, piano

Production and additional personnel

- Steve McAllister – engineering
- Roli Mosimann – engineering
- Marcia Resnick – photography
- Patrick Roques – design
- J.G. Thirlwell – engineering
