= Teenage Jesus and the Jerks =

American no wave band

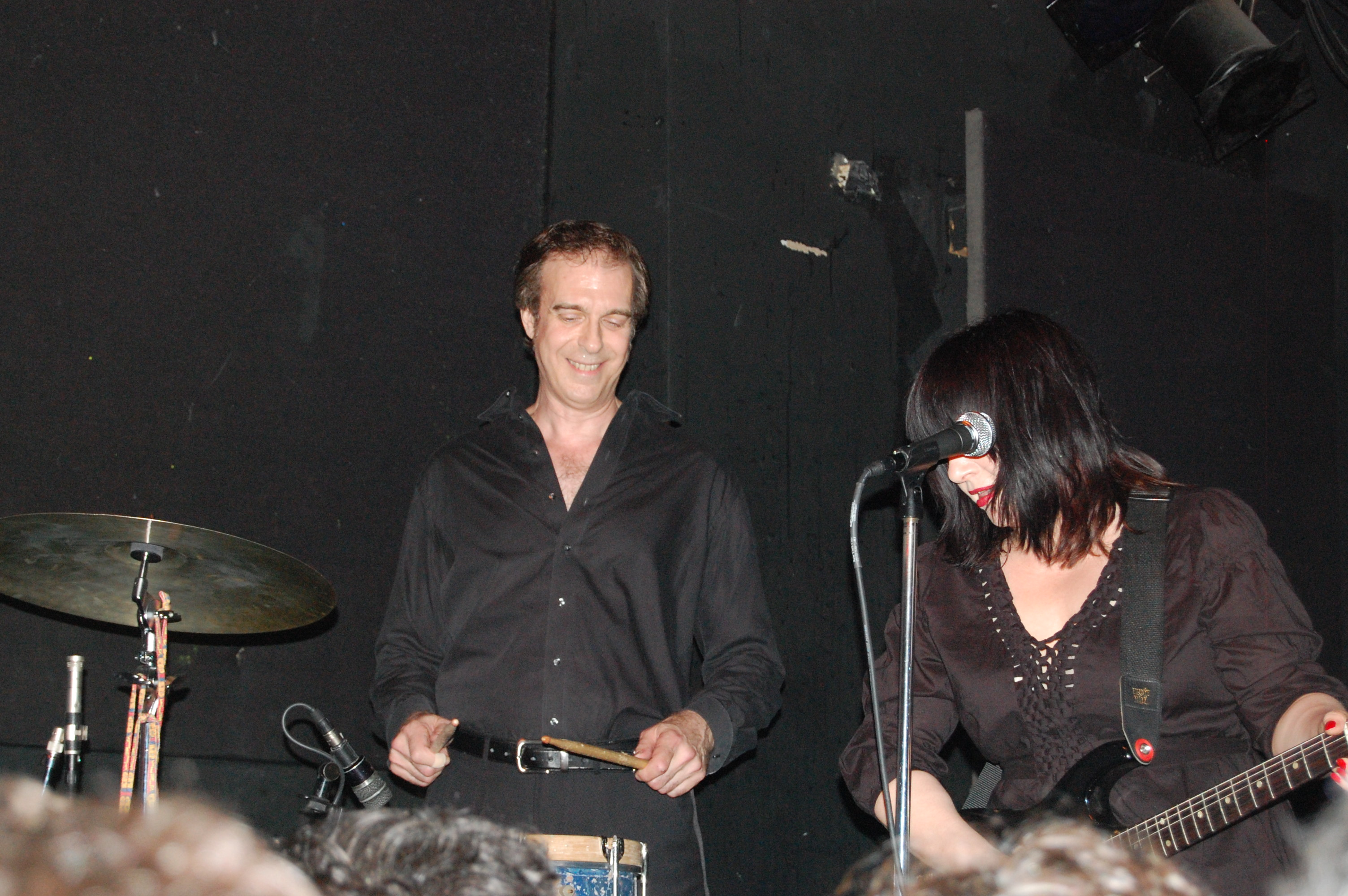
- Jim Sclavunos and Lydia Lunch performing with Teenage Jesus and the Jerks in 2008

Background information
- Also known as: Teenage Jesus & the Jerks
- Origin: New York, United States
- Genre: No wave
- Years active: 1976–1979, 2008
- Labels: Migraine, ZE, Celluloid
- Past members: Lydia Lunch; James Chance; Reck; Bradley Field; Gordon Stevenson; Jim Sclavunos

Teenage Jesus and the Jerks was an American band based in New York City, who formed part of the city's no wave movement.

== Background ==
Lydia Lunch met saxophonist James Chance at CBGB and moved into his two-room apartment. She started to combine her poetry with acoustic guitar and was spurred to start a band after seeing one of Mars' earlier performances. Lunch found guitarist Reck at CBGB and recruited him as a drummer, later moving him to bass. They formed a band called the Scabs and briefly added Jody Harris to their line-up. Lunch knew Bradley Field through Miriam Linna and convinced him to join in early 1977.

The band put together a ten-minute set of very short songs. It released only a handful of singles.

Featured on the seminal No New York LP, a showcase of the early no wave scene, compiled and produced by Brian Eno, the group left behind little more than a dozen complete recorded songs. Most of the surviving titles were collected on the eighteen-minute career retrospective compilation Everything, released in 1995 through Atavistic Records. However, other studio versions of several songs exist, alongside a few live recordings.

The group disbanded at the end of 1979, only reuniting briefly in 2008 for a small number of performances with former bassist Jim Sclavunos on drums and Thurston Moore on bass guitar.

== Musical style and philosophy ==
In his book Rip It Up and Start Again: Postpunk 1978–1984, Simon Reynolds identifies Teenage Jesus and the Jerks as an exercise in rock sacrilege:

Teenage Jesus and the Jerks, and their comrade bands Mars, Contortions and DNA, defined radicalism not as a return to roots but as deracination. Curiously, the no wave groups staged their revolt against rock tradition by using the standard rock format of guitars, bass and drums. It was as if they felt the easy electronic route to making post-rock noise was too easy. Instead, they used rock's tools against itself. Which is why no wave music irresistibly invites metaphors of dismemberment, desecration, defiling rock's corpse.

Lydia Lunch has voiced her disdain for punk rock, claiming in Rip It Up: "I hated almost the entirety of punk rock. I don't think that no wave had anything to do with it. Who wanted chords, all these progressions that had been used to death in rock? To play slide guitar I'd use a knife, a beer bottle... glass gave the best sound. To this day I still don't know a single chord on the guitar."

== Discography ==
=== Singles and EPs ===
Date	Title	Label	Format	
Date	Title	Label	Format	Catalogue
May 1978	"Orphans"/"Less of Me"	Migraine Records	7" vinyl	CC-333
April 1979	"Baby Doll"	Migraine Records	7" vinyl	CC-334
1979	Teenage Jesus and the Jerks	Migraine Records	12" pink vinyl	CC-336
1979	Pre Teenage Jesus and the Jerks	ZE Records	12" vinyl	ZE12011

=== Compilations ===
- Lydia Lunch - Hysterie (Widowspeak - 1986)
- Everything (1995 - Atavistic Records) - this claims to be a compilation of the original Teenage Jesus tracks, but is, in fact, merely side one of Lydia Lunch's 'Hysterie' compilation album, featuring material remixed by J. G. Thirlwell, credited under his pen name Clint Ruin.
- Shut Up and Bleed (2008 - Atavistic Records) - this actually is the original Teenage Jesus recordings, including all of the material from the singles and EPs and all but one song from the "No New York" album
- Live 1977-1979 (2015 - Other People) - compiles material from six different live recordings
- Discography (2015) (via Bandcamp) - A compilation of the "Pink" EP, "Pre" EP and the tracks from the "No New York" compilation. Tracks 1-10 were transcribed from vinyl copies, as master tapes are no longer available.

=== Appearances ===
- No New York (1978 - Antilles Records)
