= Encore (Klaus Nomi album) =

Encore!

Compilation album by Klaus Nomi
- Released: 1983
- Recorded: 1979–1983
- Genres: New wave, opera
- Length: 42:53
- Label: RCA
- Producers: Ron Johnsen, Klaus Nomi

Klaus Nomi chronology
Simple Man (1982)	Encore! (1983)	Za Bakdaz (2007)

Professional ratings
Review scores
Source	Rating
AllMusic	3/5 stars

Encore! is a compilation album by German countertenor Klaus Nomi, released posthumously in 1983. Two previously unreleased songs were included on the album.

Nomi died earlier that year.

== Track listing ==
Side one
No.	Title	Writer(s)	Original album	Length
1.	"Fanfare" (Instrumental)			0:40
2.	"The Cold Song"	Henry Purcell; John Dryden	Klaus Nomi	4:03
3.	"Total Eclipse" (Live version)	Kristian Hoffman	Urgh! A Music War	4:15
4.	"Can't Help Falling in Love"	Hugo Peretti; Luigi Creatore; George David Weiss	Previously Unreleased	3:55
5.	"Simple Man"	Kristian Hoffman	Simple Man	4:17
6.	"Wasting My Time"	Klaus Nomi; Scott Woody	Klaus Nomi	4:14

Side two
No.	Title	Writer(s)	Original album	Length
7.	"Wayward Sisters" (From Dido and Aeneas)	Henry Percell; Nahum Tate	Simple Man	1:43
8.	"Ding Dong"	Harold Arlen; Edgar Yipsel "Yip" Harburg	Simple Man	3:03
9.	"You Don't Own Me"	John Medora; David White	Klaus Nomi	3:39
10.	"Der Nussbaum"	Robert Schumann	Previously Unreleased	3:03
11.	"Lightning Strikes"	Lou Christie; Twyla Herbert	Klaus Nomi	2:59
12.	"The Twist"	Hank Ballard	Klaus Nomi	3:10
13.	"Samson and Delilah (Aria)" (Live at Merlyn's, Madison, Wisconsin, 20 September 1980)	Camille Saint-Saëns	Klaus Nomi	3:52

== Charts ==
Chart (1984)	Peak position
European Top 100 Albums (Eurotipsheet)	83
