= Simple Man (Klaus Nomi album) =

Studio album by Klaus Nomi
- Released: 23 November 1982
- Recorded: Track 4 recorded at Electric Lady Studios, New York. (No information provided for all other tracks)
- Genres: New wave; rock; synth-pop; disco; classical crossover
- Length: 41:02
- Label: RCA
- Producers: Ron Johnsen; Klaus Nomi

Klaus Nomi chronology
Klaus Nomi (1981)	Simple Man (1982)	Encore (1983)

Singles from Simple Man
- 1. "Simple Man" Released: 1982; 2. "Ding Dong" Released: 1982; 3. "Just One Look" Released: 1983 (Canada); 4. "ICUROK" Released: 1983 (Canada)

Simple Man is the second album by German countertenor Klaus Nomi, released on 23 November 1982 by RCA. It was also the last album of original material to be released during Nomi's lifetime.

The album consists of a mix of opera and pop music, songs by Renaissance composer John Dowland and excerpts from Baroque composer Henry Purcell's Dido and Aeneas juxtaposed with "Ding-Dong! The Witch Is Dead" from The Wizard of Oz and Marlene Dietrich's "Falling in Love Again".

== Songs and musical style ==
Simple Man takes inspiration from a variety of musical genres. Art rock, new wave and disco are combined with Klaus Nomi's love for classical opera, and glazed up with early 1980s synth-oriented pop music. The pop rock tracks "After the Fall" and "Simple Man" are written by Kristian Hoffman, who also contributed songs to Nomi's eponymous debut album. Hoffman had been musical director and keyboard player in Nomi's live band prior to the recording of Nomi's first album. However, disagreements with Nomi's management over song publishing issues led to the band being discarded in favour of session musicians. "They had to come back and rehire me for the second album," Hoffman said in 2019, "because they did a second album without me and the label rejected it. I'd already had those songs written for him. So it turned out to be really great because those were my favorite recordings of his."

The rhythmically tight "ICUROK" ("I see you are OK") is synth-pop disco with shades of Kraftwerk, written by guitarist and Nomi-collaborator George Elliott. He also wrote the music for "Three Wishes", which is much closer to a new wave sound, with its slashing guitar lines and fast tempo. It has lyrics by artist Jamie Dalglish, including a poem from his young niece Sierra. The country-influenced disco track "Rubberband Lazer" features pedal steel guitar, violin and sci-fi lyrics, and is written by former Nomi-collaborators Joey Arias and Anthony Frere. The album also contains disco and synth-pop takes on Doris Troy's 1963 R&B song "Just One Look" and "Ding-Dong! The Witch Is Dead" from the 1939 film The Wizard of Oz (here shortened to "Ding Dong"); and a post-punk-influenced, guitar-oriented version of Marlene Dietrich's Falling in Love Again, originally recorded in 1930.

Moving into classical territory, "Wayward Sisters" and "Death" (a.k.a. "Dido's Lament"), both from the opera Dido and Aeneas by Baroque composer Henry Purcell, showcase Nomi's countertenor voice to a synthesizer arrangement by keyboard player Jack Waldman. Bookending the album are the tracks "From Beyond" and "Return", both based on the choral piece "If My Complaints Could Passions Move" by Renaissance composer John Dowland. The wordless melodies are delivered by Nomi to an atmospheric synthesizer backing.

== Reception ==
Professional ratings
Review scores
Source	Rating
AllMusic	3/5 stars

In a retrospective review, AllMusic's Sean Carruthers wrote that "while the album starts out promisingly with an atmospheric fade-in followed by a hard dance number with the occasional Birthday Party-style guitar thrown in, the rest of the album did its damnedest to move the album's overall tone to one of self-parody." As examples, he pointed out the "hyper-sugary" cover of "Just One Look", the "faux-country disco" of "Rubberband Lazer", and the version of "Ding-Dong! The Witch Is Dead". Dismissing most of the album as "kitsch", Carruthers felt that Nomi's "true capabilities are shown off by his versions of classical works."

The single "Ding Dong" was described by Smash Hits as "a nightmarish cover".

== Track listing ==
Side one
No.	Title	Writer(s)	Publisher	Length
1.	"From Beyond" (based on "If My Complaints Could Passions Move" by John Dowland)	John Dowland	Spindizzy Music	2:51
2.	"After the Fall"	Kristian Hoffman	Adra Music/Scorpio Music	4:43
3.	"Just One Look"	Gregory Carroll, Doris Payne	Freimer Music Publishing, Inc. 1968	3:19
4.	"Falling in Love Again"	Frederick Hollander, Sammy Lerner	1930 Famous Music ASCAP	2:39
5.	"ICUROK"	George Elliott	Spindizzy Music/Strange Party Music 1982	4:24
6.	"Rubberband Lazer"	Joseph Arias, Anthony Frere	Spindizzy Music/Strange Party Music 1982	4:20

Side two
No.	Title	Writer(s)	Publisher	Length
7.	"Wayward Sisters" (from Dido and Aeneas)	Henry Purcell, Nahum Tate	Spindizzy Music	1:43
8.	"Ding Dong"	Harold Arlen, Edgar Yipsel "Yip" Harburg	Leo Feist, Inc. ASCAP	3:03
9.	"Three Wishes"	Elliott, Jamie Dalglish, Sierra	Spindizzy Music/Strange Party Music 1982	3:18
10.	"Simple Man"	Hoffman	Adra Music/Scorpio Music	4:17
11.	"Death" (from Dido and Aeneas)	Purcell, Tate	Spindizzy Music, Inc. 1982	4:18
12.	"Return" (based on "If My Complaints Could Passions Move" by John Dowland)	Dowland	Spindizzy Music, Inc. 1982	2:07

== Personnel ==
Musicians

- Klaus Nomi – vocals, backing vocals (2–4, 8, 10), arrangement (5)
- Kristian Hoffman – keyboards (2, 8, 10), synthesizer (8), percussion (8), arrangements (2, 4, 8, 10)
- Jack Waldman – synthesizer (1, 5, 7, 8, 11, 12), percussion (1), sound effects (6, 9), arrangements (1, 7, 11, 12)
- Tommy Mandel – keyboards (3, 5), synthesizer (6, 9)
- Jon Cobert – keyboards (4)
- Man Parrish – synthesizer programming (2, 5, 6, 8, 10)
- Scott Woody – guitar (4), pedal steel guitar (6)
- George Elliott – guitar (5, 9), percussion (9), arrangements (5, 9)
- Robert Mache – guitar (2, 8, 10), bass (2)
- Jimmy Zhivago – guitar (3, 9)
- John Kay – bass (3, 5, 6, 9)
- Rick Pascual – bass (4)
- Kevin Tooley – drums (2, 6, 8, 10)
- Robert Medici – drums (3, 5, 9), backing vocals (9)
- Daniel Elfassy – drums (4), percussion (2, 8–10)
- Paul Rutner – additional drums (8)
- Steve Elson – saxophone (3)
- Michael Levine – violin (6, 9)
- Julie Burger – backing vocals (4)

Technical

- Ron Johnsen – producer, mixing
- Klaus Nomi – producer
- Carl Casella – engineer, mixing
- Paul Silvestro – assistant engineer
- Page Wood – art direction
- Randy L. Dunbar – art direction
- Maxine St. Clair – cover photograph

== Release history ==
Release history and formats for Simple Man
Region	Date	Format	Label	ID
Europe	1982	LP; Cassette	RCA Victor	PL 37702; PK 37702
United Kingdom	1982	LP; Cassette	RCA	RCALP 6061; RCAK 6061
Canada	1983	LP; Cassette	RCA	KKL1-0488; KKK1-0488
Europe	1984	LP	RCA	PL 70229
Japan	21 August 1984	LP	Victor	VIL-6125
Europe	1985	CD	RCA	PD 70229
Japan	25 May 2005	CD (Vinyl replica sleeve)	RCA; BMG	BVCM-37610
Europe	12 June 2020	LP	Legacy; Sony Music	19439750631
Europe	16 June 2023	CD	Legacy; Sony Music	19658805012
Japan	21 June 2023	CD (Vinyl replica sleeve)	RCA	SICP 31626
