= Klaus Nomi (album) =

Studio album by Klaus Nomi
- Released: 30 November 1981
- Recorded: Electric Lady Studios, New York; Shade Tree Resort Studio, Lake Geneva, Wisconsin; Merlyn's, Madison, Wisconsin
- Genres: New wave; art pop; rock; classical crossover
- Length: 32:25
- Label: RCA
- Producer: Ron Johnsen

Klaus Nomi chronology
| Klaus Nomi (1981) | Simple Man (1982) |

Singles from Klaus Nomi
- 1. "You Don't Own Me" Released: 1981; 2. "Total Eclipse" Released: 1982; 3. "Nomi Song" Released: 1982; 4. "Lightning Strikes" Released: 1982; 5. "The Cold Song" Released: 1983

Klaus Nomi is the debut album by German countertenor Klaus Nomi, released in 1981 by RCA. The album combines his technique as an opera singer with rock influences.

== Background ==
Klaus Nomi had relocated from Germany to New York City in 1972, and by the late 1970s he had become a well-known face on the city's gay circuit as well as its performance art scene. He made his first public performance in 1978, and was soon after approached by songwriter and keyboardist Kristian Hoffman (Mumps, the Swinging Madisons), who offered to help Nomi put together a band. Hoffman, an active figure in New York's no wave scene, would become Nomi's musical director and also write some of the songs Nomi was most identified with, such as "Total Eclipse", "Nomi Song" and "After the Fall". A set of songs was put together consisting of operatic arias, original electronic pop songs, and offbeat covers adapted to Nomi's operatic singing style. With a band featuring Hoffman, Joey Arias (vocals, dancing), Tony Frere (vocals, dancing), George Elliott (guitar), Joe Katz (bass), Page Wood (drums), and others, Nomi gained attention in New York playing popular venues such as Danceteria, Hurrah's, Max's Kansas City, and the Mudd Club. Besides unusual costumes, the shows would also include dancers and elaborate sets.

Nomi's big break came when he and Arias were introduced to David Bowie one night at the Mudd Club, and the two were subsequently hired by Bowie as backing singers for a Saturday Night Live performance in December 1979. The exposure led to Nomi signing a record deal with the European branch of Bowie's label RCA. By the time Nomi recorded his debut album, his management had discarded his original band in favour of session musicians. Klaus Nomi was released in late 1981 as a Europe and Japan-only release and showcased a wide-ranging musical repertoire that drew from pop, new wave, post-punk, opera, and cabaret.

The album is dedicated to Anders Grafstrom, who was a Swedish-born film maker and friend of Nomi's. He filmed many of Nomi's early performances and directed the 1980 art film The Long Island Four, in which Nomi had a role. Grafstrom was killed in a car accident in Mexico at the age of 23 a few months after completing the film.

== Songs and musical style ==
The first thing Kristian Hoffman did when he started working with Klaus Nomi was to suggest covering Lou Christie's 1966 hit "Lightning Strikes" and reinterpret a pop song that would exploit Nomi's operatic range. Hoffman's arrangement of the song is relatively straight, with Nomi using "his piercing voice to subvert the lyrics' smarmy, swinging-bachelor heteronormativity," according to a Pitchfork review. "Hearing Klaus Nomi sing 'Every boy wants a girl' is never not funny," it stated. Lesley Gore's "You Don't Own Me" from 1963 has often been regarded as a feminist anthem, and Nomi's cover "lets the power of the original do most of the talking for him," Pitchfork opined. "From his pointed delivery of "Don't say I can't go with other boys!" to singing "I'm free and I love to be free" even higher than Gore did, he's simply making the same points in a shifted context." The album's third pop cover, "The Twist", is reinvented as a slow "bass-driven space-out" in which Nomi uses his "upper range and Germanic diction to make one of the most overplayed songs of all time sound disorientingly unfamiliar," Pitchfork said.

Thinking that Nomi should have some original material, Hoffman started writing songs for him. "I sort of was the author of the original pop musical vision for Klaus", Hoffman said in 2008. "He of course knew everything about opera and I knew nothing, so all the classical pieces were his choice and his arrangement." First Hoffman wrote the new wave-ish "Nomi Song", which Hoffman said was "sort of like an easy joke on his name, 'do you Nomi now,' ... I really thought that Klaus was so fully formed that he needed to announce [sic] himself and what his intentions were in a pop format." Hoffman's "Total Eclipse" enters the same new wave territory as "Nomi Song," and with its "nuclear panic," Pitchfork stated, it "wouldn't feel out of place on a Devo record, except of course for the singing." Both songs were written with Nomi's sci-fi stage persona in mind. "I tried to think about who he would be in music as a character, kind of like thinking about Bowie," Hoffman said. "They were very Bowie-specific. I wanted him to have this big expansive-ism. I thought grandiosity was a good thing." Nomi's self-penned "Keys of Life", a "Bowiesque" track complete with synthesizer drones and multi-layered vocals, introduces an alien visitor with a message that's both messianic and apocalyptic about the future of Earth.

The album's second side finds examples of Nomi's operatic material. "The Cold Song" is based on an aria from baroque composer Henry Purcell's King Arthur, on which Nomi transforms the original bass vocals to his countertenor voice. "Wasting My Time," a co-write between Nomi and guitarist Scott Woody is a disco-influenced track, while "Nomi Chant" is a mostly instrumental synth-orchestra soundscape written by Man Parrish. The latter serves as an introduction to the album's final track, a live recording of composer Camille Saint-Saëns's aria "Mon cœur s'ouvre à ta voix" from the 1877 opera Samson and Delilah.

== Album cover ==
The album cover photo was taken in February 1980 by photographer Michael Halsband, as part of his senior thesis at the School of Visual Arts. Halsband was an acquaintance of Joey Arias and wanted to photograph him and Klaus Nomi after seeing them on Saturday Night Live with David Bowie. Nomi showed up in Halsband's studio with a space-like plastic outfit that had just been made by a costume designer. The exaggerated Weimar-style suit was influenced by a similar outfit David Bowie wore on their Saturday Night Live performance, which again was based on Sonia Delaunay's design for 1920s Dadaist artist Tristan Tzara in the play The Gas Heart. "[Nomi] said that it would be great for me to be the first person to photograph him in that outfit, so we worked on it," Halsband said in 2010. "He and Joey loved working with me since I was into precision, trying to find a balanced portrait." Halsband has since gone on to become a successful photographer in music, art, fashion and film.

== Reception ==
Professional ratings
Review scores
| Source | Rating |
|---|---|
| AllMusic | 4.5/5 stars |
| Pitchfork | 8.4/10 |

In a retrospective review, AllMusic's Sean Carruthers wrote, "Both the cover and the music within lean heavily to the dramatic – Nomi's delivery is all in a very operatic falsetto, though most of the music itself is more of the early-'80s European dance school ... fans of off-kilter pop music will certainly find a lot to love about this album." Ira Robbins of Trouser Press wrote that the album stretches from "hauntingly beautiful (Purcell's stunning 'Cold Song') to hysterically funny (a somber reading of 'Can't Help Falling in Love,' a languid dissection of 'The Twist')". Sean T. Collins, writing retrospectively for Pitchfork, wrote that the album's "multifaceted musical intelligence ... belies any attempt to write Nomi off as a novelty act or one-trick pony." Calling Nomi "so much more than merely interesting" and "a spectacle in the best sense", Collins stated that "the album's overwhelming impression is of outsized emotion, and that's precisely the spectacular thing that Nomi's spectacle was designed to convey."

== Track listing ==
Side one
| No. | Title | Writer(s) | Publisher | Length |
|---|---|---|---|---|
| 1. | "Keys of Life" | Klaus Nomi | Spindizzy Music | 2:26 |
| 2. | "Lightning Strikes" | Lou Christie, Twyla Herbert | Rambed pub. | 2:59 |
| 3. | "The Twist" | Hank Ballard | Fort-Knox Music | 3:10 |
| 4. | "Nomi Song" | Kristian Hoffman | Adra Music, BMI | 2:47 |
| 5. | "You Don't Own Me" | John Medora, David White | Merjoda Music | 3:39 |

Side two
| No. | Title | Writer(s) | Publisher | Length |
|---|---|---|---|---|
| 6. | "The Cold Song" | Henry Purcell, John Dryden | Spindizzy Music | 4:03 |
| 7. | "Wasting My Time" | Nomi, Scott Woody | Spindizzy Music | 4:16 |
| 8. | "Total Eclipse" | Hoffman | Adra Music | 3:29 |
| 9. | "Nomi Chant" | Man Parrish | Spindizzy Music RCA | 1:53 |
| 10. | "Samson and Delilah (Aria)" (Recorded live at Merlyn's, Madison, Wisconsin, 20 September 1980) | Camille Saint-Saëns | E. Durand | 3:43 |

== Personnel ==
Adapted from the album's liner notes.

Musicians

- Klaus Nomi – vocals, backing vocals
- Jon Cobert – keyboards, backing vocals
- Scott Woody – guitar, backing vocals
- Rick Pascual – bass
- Daniel Elfassy – drums
- Julie Burger – backing vocals
- Man Parrish – additional musician
- Brian McEwan – additional musician
- Monti Ellison – additional musician

Technical

- Ron Johnsen – producer
- Michael Frondelli – engineer, mixing (Electric Lady)
- Robert Saccomanno – assistant engineer (Electric Lady)
- Jack LeTourneau – engineer (Merlyn's)
- Andy Waterman – engineer (Shade Tree Resort)
- Jack Skinner – mastering (Sterling Sound)
- Man Parrish – mastering engineer (Sterling Sound)
- Michael Halsband – cover photography
- Vitamine Studio – graphics

== Release history ==
Release history and formats for Klaus Nomi
| Region | Date | Format | Label | ID |
|---|---|---|---|---|
| West Germany | 1981 | LP | RCA Victor | PL 37556 |
| France | 1981 | LP; Cassette | RCA Victor | PL 37556; PK 37556 |
| United Kingdom | 1982 | LP | RCA | RCALP 6026 |
| Europe | 1983 | LP; Cassette | RCA | PL 70027; PK 70027 |
| Canada | 1984 | LP; Cassette | RCA | KKL1-0560; KKK1-0560 |
| Japan | 21 August 1984 | LP | Victor | VIL-6124 |
| Europe | 1985 | CD | RCA | PD 70027 |
| Europe | 1990 | LP; Cassette; CD | RCA; BMG | NL 74420; NK 74420; ND 74420 |
| Japan | 25 May 2005 | CD (Vinyl replica sleeve) | RCA; BMG | BVCM-37609 |
| United States | 4 June 2019 | LP (Black and White 'Cabaret Smoke' vinyl) | Real Gone Music; RCA Victor; Sony Music | RGM-0906 |
| United States | 6 December 2019 | LP ("Hot Pink" vinyl) | Real Gone Music; RCA Victor; Sony Music | RGM951 |
| Europe | 12 June 2020 | LP | Legacy; Sony Music | 19439750621 |
| Europe | 16 June 2023 | Cassette; CD | Legacy; Sony Music | 19658801124; 19658805002 |
| Japan | 21 June 2023 | CD (Vinyl replica sleeve) | RCA; Sony Music | SICP 31625 |
