= Jamie Dalglish =

American painter (born 1947)

- Born: James Parsons Dalglish; 1947 (age 78–79); Bryn Mawr, Pennsylvania
- Known for: Painting; video art
- Movement: Abstract art; geometric abstraction

James Parsons Dalglish (born 1947) is an American abstract painter. He lives and works in New York City.

== Early life and work ==
Jamie Dalglish was born in Bryn Mawr, Pennsylvania in 1947 and served in the navy from 1967 to 1969 on a submarine in the Vietnam War. In the early 1970s, he attended the Art Academy of Cincinnati and Rhode Island School of Design, where he studied video art. When Dalglish first moved to New York City in May 1974, he was a housemate of fellow RISD student David Byrne, who would later gain fame as lead singer of the band Talking Heads and as a solo musical artist.

In 1975, Dalglish finished a video art project that consisted entirely of interviews with fifteen of his artist friends talking with Byrne — with Byrne offscreen the entire time doing most of the talking. The point of the video wasn't what Byrne said, but the body language of the listeners. The name of the seven-and-a-half-hour video was "Talking Heads, a 7.5 hr Conversation Installation." Participants in the video included Talking Heads drummer Chris Frantz, and artists Jeff Koons, Jeff Turtletaub, and Vito Acconci. The video was exhibited in 1979 at The Kitchen in New York. The full video appears to be lost, with only a few short excerpts having survived.

In collaboration with guitarist and songwriter George Elliott, Dalglish created the short-lived rock performance group CONTAINER in 1979. The group consisted of a five-person band, with Dalglish as vocalist and lyricist, plus a 10-year-old female singer, dancers, and a film and video crew. A recording of their music has since been released on a CD. One of their songs, "Three Wishes", was recorded by Klaus Nomi on his 1982 album Simple Man.

Dalglish began painting in the 1970s and had his first art exhibition in 1979 in New York City.

== Later work ==
In the early 1990s, Dalglish originated the word "morphoglyph" to define his painting. He has explained that it "combines the word "morph", growing or changing forms (from Morpheus, the son of the god of sleep, the form of dreams) with the word "glyph", an incision or cryptograph – secret writing, the language of the soul. I think morphoglyphs provide abstract painting with a surface that seems to say, "art is the art of becoming art."

Dalglish received a 2006–2007 Pollock-Krasner Foundation grant. He has exhibited in galleries including OK Harris, Match artspace, Barbara Braathen, and Florence Lynch. Dalglish's morphoglyphs have been cited by art writer Lee Klein, among the works of Jackson Pollock and David Reed, as part of the trans-filmic lead into the art of Hyper-texture. He was included in the exhibition "I colori del rock," which ran in 2009, from January 29 through March 3, at Pavesi Fine Arts in Milan, Italy.

== Exhibitions ==
Solo exhibitions

- 1979 – Nell Gifford Contemporary Painting, New York City, New York
- 1979 – Port Washington Public Library, Port Washington, New York
- 1980 – Braathen-Gallozzi Gallery, New York City
- 1981/1982 – Barbara Braathen Gallery, New York City
- 1983 – Serra di Felice Gallery, New York City
- 1985 – Sarah Rentschler Gallery, New York City
- 1985/1986 – Barbara Braathen Gallery, New York City
- 1987 – Barbara Braathen Gallery, New York City
- 1988 – Barbara Braathen Gallery, New York City
- 1989 – Palimpsests and Poltergeists, Barbara Braathen Gallery, New York City
- 1992 – OK Harris Works of Art, New York City
- 1991 – OK Harris Works of Art, New York City
- 1997 – Hvgo de Pagano Gallery, New York City
- 2001 – Novart, New York City
- 2005 – Transparent Time, MATCH Artspace, New York City
- 2006 – Saint Peter's Church, New York City
- 2008 – LIC Art Center Open Studios: Studio 512, New York City

Selected group exhibitions

- 1979 – Sarah Rentschler Gallery, New York City
- 1980 – Eight From New York, State University of New York at Stony Brook, Stony Brook, New York (curated by Lawrence Alloway)
- 1983 – Hard to Pronounce, Arts and Commerce Gallery, New York City
- 1984 – Serra di Felice Gallery, New York City
- 1985 – Nineteen Downtown, Michael Katz Gallery, New York City
- 1986 – Artists Choose Designer, E.M. Donahue Gallery, New York City
- 1987 – Sculpture Invitational, 56 Bleecker Street Ltd., New York City
- 1987 – Art Against Aids, Dia Art Foundation, New York City
- 1992 – Abstraction and Reality, Montgomery Center, Jersey City, New Jersey
- 1994 – Young Guns: East Coast Artists, Nevada Institute For Contemporary Art, Las Vegas, Nevada
- 1995 – "Semaphore: Placing the Mark. Bill Bace's Salon des Refuses", New York City
- 1996 – Ludmila Baczynsky Gallery, New York City
- 1997 – Solo: International Artists Established in NYC, New York City (curated by Hvgo de Pagano)
- 2003 – "Hypertexture", Florence Lynch Gallery, New York City
- 2005 – "Vice Versa", MATCH Artspace, New York City
- 2009 – The Pequot Library Show, Southport, Connecticut
- 2009 – "I colori del rock. Pittura americana dagli anni Cinquanta a oggi", Galleria Arnaldo Pavesi, Milan, Italy
- 2010 – "The High Line Artist Walk Armory Show", New York City
- 2011 – "Global Arts Projects Presents The International Artists at Home and Abroad Exhibition Series", New York City

Video exhibitions

- 1979 – "Talking Heads, a 7.5 hr Conversation Installation", The Kitchen Viewing Room, New York City
- 1982 – "Signs, Semiotics, Behavior", Museum of Art, Rhode Island School of Design, Providence, Rhode Island
- 1982 – "Video-USA", Centre d'Art Contemporain Genève, Geneva, Switzerland
- 1984 – "King Lear's High Theatre of Sovereign Immunity", Come(T) Here, Limelight, New York City

== Grants ==
- 1989 – Polaroid Corporation
- 2006-2007 – Pollock-Krasner Foundation
