= Kristian Hoffman =

American musician

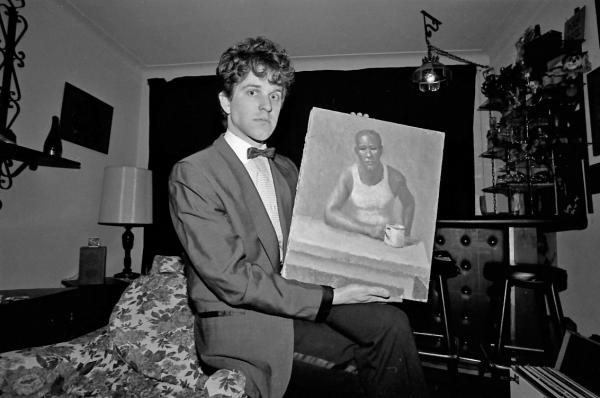
- Kristian Hoffman (circa 1980), photograph by Steve Lombardi taken in New York City

Background information
- Born: July 10, 1952 (age 73)
- Genres: Punk rock, rock, no wave, baroque pop
- Occupations: Musician, songwriter, keyboardist, singer
- Instrument: Keyboard instrument
- Website: http://www.kristianhoffman.com/index.htm

Kristian Hoffman (b. July 10, 1952) is an American musician, record producer and visual artist. As a member of Bleaker St. Incident, alongside Ann Magnuson and Robert Mache, Hoffman spearheaded the Anti-folk music movement. Concurrently, he was in the lounge rock band The Swinging Madisons, and was the original musical director for Klaus Nomi, writing many of Nomi's best known songs. Hoffman has also served as a regular member of the Mink Stole band, the Abby Travis band, the Carolyn Edwards band, and the Jane Wiedlin lounge combo Downtown Sensation. In addition, he has appeared as a session musician on albums by Andrew, the Jigsaw Seen, Carolyn Edwards, Blow Up (with Deborah Harry), and El Vez. Hoffman has also served as a DJ on Internet radio station Luxuria Music.

== Biography and career ==
Kristian Hoffman came into public consciousness as the best friend of Lance Loud in the PBS series An American Family. His sister is the writer Nina Kiriki Hoffman. During the mid 1970s, Hoffman emerged as songwriter and keyboardist for New York City based band Mumps, and was also an active figure in the No Wave, performing alongside the likes of Lydia Lunch and the Contortions, and playing keys and singing on the James White and the Blacks LP Off White.

Hoffman later played in Kid Congo Powers' group Congo Norvell. By the 1990s, Hoffman was performing regularly as a solo artist; in 1993, he issued his debut I Don't Love My Guru Anymore, followed four years later by Earthquake Weather. For the remainder of the decade, Hoffman worked with Dave Davies and El Vez on various projects and also served as music director for Ann Magnuson and Rufus Wainwright. In 2002, he and producer Earle Mankey crafted a third album of duets, &. & included collaborations such as "Get It Right This Time" with that dog.'s Anna Waronker, "Scarecrow" with Rufus Wainwright, and "Devil May Care" with Russell Mael of Sparks. "Revert to Type" featured string arrangements from Van Dyke Parks. "Madison Avenue" is a duet with El Vez, "The Mexican Elvis." There is also a guest appearance from Pee Wee Herman AKA Paul Reubens. There are team-ups with the Three O'Clock's Michael Quercio, Maria McKee of Lone Justice, Lydia Lunch, and Ann Magnuson.

In late 2005, a documentary on Klaus Nomi, The Nomi Song, directed by Andrew Horn, was released and received wide critical praise and several awards. The documentary has since come out on DVD (a Palm Pictures Release). It features extensive interviews with Hoffman and many of Nomi's other key collaborators, as well as footage of many rare concert and television appearances by Nomi. Four of Hoffman's compositions for Nomi are featured in the film, as well as some original incidental music and some clips of Mumps songs. The DVD extras include an extended interview with Hoffman wherein he details his thoughts behind each song he composed for Nomi.

Also released in 2005 was How I Saved the World, a newly remastered Mumps compilation, with all the tracks on the original 1995 eggBERT release plus ten extra unreleased tracks, all composed by Hoffman. The compilation also includes a full color 24-page booklet and a companion DVD of vintage Mumps performances at CBGB, the Mudd Club and other no wave venues, with optional commentary by Hoffman. This double-disc compilation was released by Sympathy for the Record Industry Records.

Hoffman spent much of the first half of 2006 producing a new full-length CD for long-time collaborator Ann Magnuson, called Pretty Songs and Ugly Stories. Besides playing on the album with his band The Rock Gods, Hoffman also co-wrote ten of the songs with Magnuson. Rufus Wainwright added a one-man chorale to the CD's "Whatever Happened To New York." Other songs on the CD feature performances by the Chapin Sisters, Jonathan Lea of the Jigsaw Seen, D. J. Bonebrake of X, and Heather Lockie of Listing Ship. The album was released December 2006 and the record release party in the Walt Disney Concert Hall's REDCAT Theater was sold out, necessitating the addition of a second show. Guest artists for the shows included Candypants' Lisa Jenio, as well as Prince Poppycock. Two sold out shows at L.A.'s Steve Allen Theater followed quickly thereafter. Throughout 2007, Hoffman continued to be Ann Magnuson's musical director as she played select dates around the country to promote Pretty Songs.

For over three years, Hoffman was the keyboard player for the popular Velvet Hammer Burlesque house band, led by the Millionaire (of Combustible Edison fame). The Velvet Hammer Burlesque ran monthly at the El Rey Theatre (Los Angeles) until director/producer Michelle Carr relocated to Germany. The band occasionally played original Hoffman compositions. Hoffman's original compositions were also featured in the film documentary The Velvet Hammer Burlesque, by filmmaker Augusta. Other regular solo and duet appearances by Hoffman included a series at West Hollywood late Parlour Club, hosted by performance artist Vaginal Davis.

Hoffman reported on his official website, as well as his Myspace and Facebook pages, that he had finished recording his new 17 song album, Fop, in late 2008; that it was being mixed by Earle Mankey; and that its release was expected in mid-2009. It released in October 2010. On July 27, 2010, the classical-crossover act Timur and the Dime Museum released their album, The Collection: Songs from the Operatic Underground, containing five cover songs by Kristian Hoffman, with Kristian Hoffman playing the piano on Total Eclipse. LA Weekly compared Kristian Hoffman's lyrics in the song "Lite of the World", as "dark lyrics that wouldn't be out of place on a Thom Yorke album".

Theater Magdeburg presented a sold-out concert Klaus from Space, featuring four songs by Kristian Hoffman performed by avant-garde tenor Timur Bekbosunov on May 9, 2025 as part of eXoplanet Festival in Germany.

== Visual art ==
Hoffman is also a visual artist who has designed album cover art for such musicians as The Voltaires, Andrew, and X, and for releases such as eggBERT Records' Hollies tribute Sing Hollies in Reverse, as well as his own "He Means Well" limited-edition 45 cover. Hoffman's art was also highlighted in the books Two Blocks East of Vine by Iris Berry, and Incriminating Evidence by Lydia Lunch. His most famous art composition to date probably remains the notorious "Bendover Girl" from an insert in the original edition of the New York Dolls' first album, since reproduced on tee shirts, tattoos and drum heads all over the world.

In 2005, Hoffman was featured in two separate one-man art shows in Los Angeles galleries; the first an extensive retrospective of thirty years of illustration work, and the other a showing of several new larger format artworks. He also designed the poster for the Green Day Documentary Heart Like a Hand Grenade.

== Personal life ==
Hoffman is openly gay and, as reported by The Advocate in 2005, his partner is playwright Justin Tanner.

== Discography ==
- FOP (2010) (Solo album)
- Ann Magnuson: Pretty Songs and Ugly Stories (Produced, arranged and co-written by Kristian Hoffman) (2006)
- Mumps: How I Saved The World – 2 disc CD/DVD retrospective (includes 29 Kristian Hoffman compositions) (2005)
- & (2003) (solo album)
- The Guru Home Demos (2003) (Website-only CD release of original home demos for I Don't Love My Guru Anymore)
- The Am-Fam Variations (2002) (website only CD release of incidental music recorded for the PBS documentary Lance Loud! A Death in an American Family)
- Earthquake Weather (1996) (solo album)
- "He Means Well"/"Green Circles" (1995) (7" Preview green vinyl 45 for lead song from Earthquake Weather, with non-CD B-Side Small Faces cover "Green Circles")
- Congo Norvell: Live in the Mission (1995) (7" yellow vinyl 45 EP, keys & co-writer one song)
- Mumps: Fatal Charm (1994) (original Mumps compilation on Eggbert Records)
- Congo Norvell: Music To Remember Him By (1994) (keys, guitar, backing vocals, co-wrote five songs)
- I Don't Love My Guru Anymore (1993) (solo album)
- Congo Norvell: Lullabies (1992) (keys, co-writer one song)
- Swinging Madisons: Appearing Nightly (1980) (Songwriter, lead singer −5 song 12" vinyl EP)

Compilations:

- Lydia Lunch: Deviations on a Theme (2006) career retrospective; includes Hoffman duet with Lydia "I Can't Remember My Dreams", co-written with Lydia
- The Definitive Story of CBGB (2006) includes Mumps song "We Ended Up"
- New York Rocks (2005) Koch Records – includes the Mumps song "Crocodile Tears"
- Apples, Oranges, Nuts, Bolts (2003) "Best of L.A." compilation includes Hoffman's duet with Russell Mael, "Devil May Care," from &
- Sing Hollies in Reverse (1995) Hollies tribute album; includes Hoffman's cover of "I'm Alive"
- Melody Fair (1995) Bee Gees tribute album; includes Hoffman's cover of "Lemons Never Forget"

Other projects:

- Muffs: No Holiday (2019) (Keys)
- Alice Bag Blueprint (2018) (Keys)
- Alice Bag Alice Bag (2016) (Keys)
- Muffs: "Changes" (2015) keys – released on Bowie Tribute "A Salute To The Thin White Duke – The Songs Of David Bowie" (Cleopatra CLO 0018)
- Abby Travis: Glittermouth (2006) keys, backing vocal arrangements, co-writing credits on "Now Was" and "Hunger"
- Carolyn Edwards: Carolyn Edwards (2005) keys
- Andrew Sandoval: What's It All About (2005) keys
- The Shakes: Gigantes Del Pop (2004) The Shakes cover Hoffman's composition "Crocodile Tears"
- Music To Lose Your Knickers By (2004) Velvet Hammer Burlesque Documentary Soundtrack. 2 instrumental compositions written, recorded, and performed by Hoffman
- Blow-up (with Deborah Harry): In Technicolor (2003) keys, guitar
- Dave Davies: Bug (2002) keyboards
- Sally Norvell: Choking Victim (2002) includes Hoffman/Norvell composition "Murder"
- Rosenstolz: Kassengift (2000) includes Hoffman composition "Total Eclipse"
- Rosenstolz with Marc Almond: "Total Eclipse" (2001) Single Remix of album version of "Total Eclipse" with new lead vocals by Marc Almond
- Abby Travis: Cutthroat Standards and Black Pop (2000) Co-produced and Arranged by Hoffman. Keys, co-writing credit on "October"
- Andrew: A Beautiful Story (2000) cover art, keyboards
- The Jigsaw Seen: Zenith (2000) keyboards
- Listen and Learn With Vibra-phonic (1999) Hoffman produced, arranged, and played keyboards on Ann Magnuson version of David Bowie's "Moonage Daydream". Also includes Hoffman's solo cover of "Green Circles"
- Klaus Nomi: Eclipsed (1999) includes Hoffman compositions Total Eclipse", "After the Fall", "Nomi Song" and "Simple Man", and Hoffman arranged songs "Lightning Strikes", "The Twist", "Just One Look" and "Falling in Love Again"
- El Vez: Son of a Lad From Spain (1999) keyboards
- Dave Davies: Rock Bottom Live (1997) keyboards
- El Vez: G.I. Ay Ay Blues (1996) keyboards
- Lydia Lunch: In Limbo (1984) keyboards
- Lydia Lunch: The Agony Is The Ecstasy (1982) drums
- James White and the Blacks: Off White (1979) vocals, keyboards, co-wrote "Almost Black"
- Gary Valentine: "The First One" (1978) Hoffman, along with the rest of Mumps, backs up Gary Valentine on his first solo 45

== Filmography ==
- Rome '78 (Actor, screenwriter)
- The Long Island Four (Actor)
- Vortex (Incidental music)
- Downtown 81 (Actor)
- Love Dolls Superstar (Incidental Music)
- The Nomi Song (Interviewee, songwriter, incidental music)
- Jobriath A.D. (Interviewee)

== Sources ==
- Los Angeles Times: "If I Ran The Oscars"
- Boogie Woogie Flu: "Fop"
- Bluefat: "Tales of Hoffman"
- Magnet Guest Editor: From the Desk of Kristian Hoffman – "Tages' 'Studio'"
- Magnet Guest Editor: From the Desk of Kristian Hoffman – "Why Why Why"
- Magnet Guest Editor: From the Desk of Kristian Hoffman – "Los Shakers (The Ersatz Was Never So Exquisite)"
- Magnet Guest Editor: From the Desk of Kristian Hoffman – "Fop For Pop!"
- Magnet Guest Editor: From the Desk of Kristian Hoffman – "Smiley-Come-Lately (My Tardy Love For Brett)"
- Magnet Guest Editor: From the Desk of Kristian Hoffman – "Protest Is Best"
- Magnet Guest Editor: From the Desk of Kristian Hoffman – "Vintage Cat Glass Eye"
- Magnet Guest Editor: From the Desk of Kristian Hoffman – "Rocky Schenck Photography"
- Magnet Guest Editor: From the Desk of Kristian Hoffman – "Picture Book"
- Magnet Guest Editor: From the Desk of Kristian Hoffman – "Weepers"
- L.A. Weekly Interview
- Trouser Press Swinging Madisons Entry
- Encyclopedia.com Congo Norvell entry
- Kristian Hoffman interviewed by JD Doyle for Queer Music Heritage
- Rolling Stone review
