= We Are Twisted Fucking Sister! =

- Theatrical release poster
- Directed by: Andrew Horn
- Written by: Andrew Horn
- Produced by: Andrew Horn
- Cinematography: Mark Daniels
- Edited by: Silke Botsch; Erik Schefter
- Production company: Andrew Horn Filmproduktion
- Release date: November 30, 2014 (IDFA)
- Running time: 136 minutes
- Countries: Germany; United States
- Language: English

We Are Twisted Fucking Sister! is a 2014 German-US documentary about the early years of heavy metal band Twisted Sister directed by Andrew Horn.

== Synopsis ==
Through interviews, filmmaker Andrew Horn traces the history of Twisted Sister from their origins in the bar scene of early 1970s Long Island to their pre-MTV rise as a popular regional, New York-based band in the mid 1970s and early 1980s.

== Production ==
Horn became acquainted with the band when he made his previous documentary, The Nomi Song. Though he was not a fan, he found the band to be interesting and entertaining.

== Release ==
In 2014, Dee Snider endorsed the documentary and its Indiegogo crowdfunding campaign for distribution. We Are Twisted Fucking Sister! premiered at the International Documentary Film Festival Amsterdam on November 30, 2014. Band member Jay Jay French attended the premiere. A preview fundraiser was held at a club in Ferndale, Michigan, on January 9, 2015.

== Reception ==
Neil Young of The Hollywood Reporter called it "a raucously riotous rags-to-riches record of rip-roaring rock renegades". Geoffrey Macnab of The Independent wrote that it is "uproarious and poignant by turns".
