= Doomed Love (1983 film) =

- Directed by: Andrew Horn
- Written by: Andrew Horn; Jim Neu
- Starring: William Rice; Black-Eyed Susan; Rosemary Moore; Allen Frame; Charles Ludlam
- Cinematography: Carl Teitelbaum
- Edited by: Charlie Beesley; Steven C. Brown
- Music by: Evan Lurie
- Release date: 1983
- Running time: 75 minutes

Doomed Love is a 1983 American musical film directed by Andrew Horn. The film premiered at the Independent Feature Project in New York on October 13, 1983, before screening at the 34th Berlin International Film Festival in 1984.

== Plot ==
Professor Andre is depressed because of the loss of his lover. Seeking treatment after a suicide attempt, he strikes up a conversation with the receptionist at the doctor's office, Lois. Lois and her husband Bob attempt to cheer Andre up. Andre and Lois have an unspoken romance, but he finds himself unable to forget his lover.

== Cast ==
- Andre - William Rice
- Lois - Rosemary Moore
- Bob - Allen Frame

== Production ==
Doomed Love was director Andrew Horn's first feature length film. Artists Amy Sillman and Pamela Wilson hand-painted the monochromatic sets used in the film. They were constructed at the studio of the Millennium Film Workshop. The film features Glück, das mir verblieb, a duet from the 1920 opera Die tote Stadt, alongside original music composed by Evan Lurie.
