= Cinema Verite (2011 film) =

2011 television film

- Promotional poster
- Screenplay by: David Seltzer
- Directed by: Shari Springer Berman; Robert Pulcini
- Starring: Diane Lane; Tim Robbins; James Gandolfini; Kathleen Quinlan; Thomas Dekker
- Theme music composer: Rolfe Kent
- Country of origin: United States
- Original language: English

Production
- Producers: Gavin Polone; Zanne Devine
- Cinematography: Affonso Beato
- Editors: Sarah Flack; Robert Pulcini
- Running time: 90 min
- Production company: HBO Films

Original release
- Network: HBO
- Release: April 23, 2011

Cinema Verite is a 2011 HBO drama film directed by Shari Springer Berman and Robert Pulcini. The film's main ensemble cast starred Diane Lane, Tim Robbins, James Gandolfini and Patrick Fugit. The film follows a fictionalized account of the production of An American Family, a 1973 PBS documentary television series that is said to be one of the earliest examples of the reality television genre. Principal photography was completed in Southern California. The film premiered on April 23, 2011.

== Plot ==
In 1971, Craig Gilbert discusses with Pat Loud the idea of a documentary series that would concern her family's day-to-day lives in Santa Barbara, California. Pat considers the proposal and accepts, amidst her son Lance moving to New York City. Pat's husband Bill travels often away on business, leaving Pat alone to care for their five children.

The crew, including Alan and Susan Raymond, moves in with the Louds and begins to document them. Relations between Pat and Bill grow frayed due to his time away and the stress of the TV show's production. Gilbert tells Pat of his suspicions surrounding Bill's trips away, giving fairly strong evidence that he is cheating on her. The crew fights with Gilbert about his documentary technique, as he makes them film many personal moments.

After surreptitiously duplicating the keys to Bill's office, Pat makes a late night trip to the office and discovers documents that confirm he is cheating on Pat with two other women, resulting in Pat's preparations to file for a divorce. Angry, she tells Gilbert to have cameras there when she tells Bill, wanting "his bimbos to see it, the whole world to see it." Against her wishes, he films Pat's conversation with her brother Tom Russell and his wife Yvonne.

Pat begins to regret her decision to let Gilbert film the break up and tries to get Grant, one of her sons, to tell him while driving Bill home instead. He, however, does not work up the courage to do this and Pat kicks Bill out of her home on camera.

One year later, An American Family is experiencing its premiere. The show airs to strong television ratings but much criticism of members of the family, in particular Pat for how she came off on camera and Lance for his homosexuality. The family then gets together to "fight back", addressing their critics by appearing on many talk shows.

Title cards at film's end offer updates for each Loud family member. Lance died of AIDS-related hepatitis in 2001; his last wish for his parents was to cohabitate. They currently live together in Los Angeles.

== Cast ==
- Diane Lane as Pat Loud
- Tim Robbins as Bill Loud
- James Gandolfini as Craig Gilbert
- Thomas Dekker as Lance Loud
- Caitlin Custer as Delilah Loud
- Kaitlyn Dever as Michelle Loud
- Nick Eversman as Grant Loud
- Johnny Simmons as Kevin Loud
- Patrick Fugit as Alan Raymond
- Shanna Collins as Susan Raymond
- Jake Richardson as Tommy Goodwin
- Kathleen Quinlan as Mary Every
- Lolita Davidovich as Val
- Matt O'Leary as Cameron
- Stephen Caffrey as Tom Russell
- Monika Jolly as Yvonne Russell
- Willam Belli as Candy Darling
- Kyle Riabko as Jackie Curtis
- Richard Fancy as Hartford N. Gunn Jr.
- Don McManus as Host
- Robert Curtis Brown as Anthropologist
- Dawn Hudson as Commentator
- Molly Hagan as Kay
- Sean O'Bryan as Johnny Hall
- Michelle Morgan as Salesgirl
- Emilio Rivera as Nightwatchman

== Production ==
Principal photography was completed primarily in Los Angeles, California.

The film is presented in chapters, with chapter titles such as The Chelsea and The Battle for the Camera Begins. When the chapter titles are shown, short clips from the original 1973 documentary An American Family are shown alongside in split screen format.

== Critical reception ==
Cinema Verite met with a positive reception from television critics. On review aggregator Metacritic the film received a "generally positive" score of 74 out of 100, based on 23 reviews.

=== Awards and nominations ===
Year	Award	Category	Nominee(s)	Result	Ref.
2011	Artios Awards	Outstanding Achievement in Casting – Television Movie/Mini Series	Randi Hiller	Nominated	
2011	Online Film & Television Association Awards	Best Motion Picture or Miniseries		Nominated	
2011	Online Film & Television Association Awards	Best Actress in a Motion Picture or Miniseries	Diane Lane	Nominated	
2011	Online Film & Television Association Awards	Best Supporting Actor in a Motion Picture or Miniseries	Thomas Dekker	Nominated	
2011	Online Film & Television Association Awards	Best Direction of a Motion Picture or Miniseries	Shari Springer Berman and Robert Pulcini	Nominated	
2011	Online Film & Television Association Awards	Best Ensemble in a Motion Picture or Miniseries		Nominated	
2011	Online Film & Television Association Awards	Best Cinematography in a Non-Series		Nominated	
2011	Online Film & Television Association Awards	Best Editing in a Non-Series		Nominated	
2011	Online Film & Television Association Awards	Best Makeup/Hairstyling in a Non-Series		Nominated	
2011	Online Film & Television Association Awards	Best Music in a Non-Series		Nominated	
2011	Primetime Emmy Awards	Outstanding Miniseries or Movie	Gavin Polone, Zanne Devine, and Karyn McCarthy	Nominated	
2011	Primetime Emmy Awards	Outstanding Lead Actress in a Miniseries or a Movie	Diane Lane	Nominated	
2011	Primetime Emmy Awards	Outstanding Directing for a Miniseries, Movie or a Dramatic Special	Shari Springer Berman and Robert Pulcini	Nominated	
2011	Primetime Creative Arts Emmy Awards	Outstanding Casting for a Miniseries, Movie or a Special	Randi Hiller	Nominated	
2011	Primetime Creative Arts Emmy Awards	Outstanding Costumes for a Miniseries, Movie or a Special	Suttirat Anne Larlarb and Joseph T. Mastrolia	Nominated	
2011	Primetime Creative Arts Emmy Awards	Outstanding Hairstyling for a Miniseries or a Movie	Terry Baliel, Carol Pershing, and Beth Miller	Nominated	
2011	Primetime Creative Arts Emmy Awards	Outstanding Makeup for a Miniseries or a Movie (Non-Prosthetic)	Mindy Hall, Kimberly Felix, and Julie Hewett	Nominated	
2011	Primetime Creative Arts Emmy Awards	Outstanding Single-Camera Picture Editing for a Miniseries or a Movie	Sarah Flack and Robert Pulcini	Won	
2011	Primetime Creative Arts Emmy Awards	Outstanding Sound Mixing for a Miniseries or a Movie	Petur Hliddal, Lora Hirschberg, Scott R. Lewis, and Douglas Murray	Nominated	
2011	Satellite Awards	Best Miniseries or Motion Picture Made for Television		Nominated	
2011	Satellite Awards	Best Actress in a Miniseries or a Motion Picture Made for Television	Diane Lane	Nominated	
2011	Television Critics Association Awards	Outstanding Achievement in Movies, Miniseries and Specials		Nominated	
2011	Women's Image Network Awards	Actress Made for Television Movie	Diane Lane	Won	
2012	American Cinema Editors Awards	Best Edited Miniseries or Motion Picture for Television	Sarah Flack and Robert Pulcini	Won	
2012	Art Directors Guild Awards	Excellence in Production Design Award – Television Movie or Mini-Series	Patti Podesta, Dawn Masi, Christopher Tandon, Philip Toolin, Martin Charles, Eric Rosenberg, Meg Everist, and James V. Kent	Nominated	
2012	Cinema Audio Society Awards	Outstanding Achievement in Sound Mixing for Television Movies and Mini-Series	Petur Hliddal, Lora Hirschberg, Scott R. Lewis, Douglas Murray, and Greg Townley	Nominated	
2012	GLAAD Media Awards	Outstanding TV Movie or Mini-Series		Won	
2012	Golden Globe Awards	Best Miniseries or Television Film		Nominated	
2012	Golden Globe Awards	Best Actress – Miniseries or Television Film	Diane Lane	Nominated	
2012	Golden Globe Awards	Best Supporting Actor – Series, Miniseries or Television Film	Tim Robbins	Nominated	
2012	Golden Reel Awards	Best Sound Editing – Long Form Dialogue and ADR in Television	Douglas Murray, Susan Dudeck, and Kim Foscato	Nominated	
2012	Golden Reel Awards	Best Sound Editing - Long Form Sound Effects and Foley in Television	Douglas Murray, Steve Bissinger, Kim Foscato, Larry Oatfield, Robert Shoup, Goro Koyama, and Andy Malcolm	Nominated	
2012	Guild of Music Supervisors Awards	Best Music Supervision for Television Long Form and Movie	Evyen Klean (also for Mildred Pierce, The Sunset Limited, and Too Big to Fail)	Won	
2012	Humanitas Prize	90 Minute or Longer Network or Syndicated Television	David Seltzer	Won	
2012	Producers Guild of America Awards	David L. Wolper Award for Outstanding Producer of Long-Form Television	Zanne Devine and Karyn McCarthy	Nominated	
2012	Screen Actors Guild Awards	Outstanding Performance by a Female Actor in a Television Movie or Miniseries	Diane Lane	Nominated	
2012	Writers Guild of America Awards	Long Form – Original	David Seltzer	Won	
