= Skafish =

American punk band

- Origin: Chicago, Illinois, US
- Genres: Punk rock
- Years active: 1976–1985
- Labels: I.R.S. Records, Illegal Records
- Past members: Jim Skafish; Barbie Goodrich; Ken Bronowski; Lee Gatlin; Javier Cruz; Larry Mazalan; Larry Mysliwiec; Karen Winner; Mark Winner; Greg Sarchet; David Prochaska; Jeff Ward
- Website: link

Skafish /ˈskeɪfɪʃ/ is an American, Chicago-based punk band, fronted by Jim Skafish, cousin of Chicago area DJ Bobby Skafish. The band was formed in 1976 and had their first performance that November.

In 1977, Billboard magazine printed a review of the band's performance as the opening act for Sha Na Na at Chicago's Arie Crown Theater. Finding Skafish to be a "peculiar appetizer for the straight, conservative crowd" that Sha Na Na attracted, the reviewer stated that "[l]arge numbers retreated to the lobby halfway through Skafish's set, while others approached the stage, threatening with missiles, gestures and denunciations." Jim Skafish himself was described as "a 20-year-old musician from Gary, Ind., who appears to be in transition between man and woman ... dressed androgynously, hair in a pageboy," who at one point in the show "strips down to a woman's bathing suit and nervously applies lipstick to the face." While describing the band's music as "strange, inward-directed lyrics [set] to a repetitious and often dissonant accompaniment", the reviewer noted that Skafish "gave the impression that he had something to tell the audience about itself. ... Yet it remains to be seen whether Skafish has something to say and to whom."

== First album ==
The band's first album on I.R.S. Records, Skafish, was recorded during the summer of 1979 in South Chicago's PS studios, a facility more widely known for soul, funk and pop music. Personnel on the album consisted of Jim Skafish on keys and vocals, Barbie Goodrich on vocals, Ken Bronowski on guitars and vocals, Larry Mysliwiec on drums, Larry Mazalan on bass guitar and Javier Cruz on keyboards. The sessions dragged on through the summer of 1979, eventually going wildly over the shoestring budget production style that was the I.R.S. founder Miles Copeland III's trademark, so successful for projects like early The Police and Wishbone Ash albums. Release of Skafish was delayed for many months under financial constraints, and the project was eventually mixed on low budget and released by IRS just before the band left for an extended European tour with The Police, XTC, English Beat, UB40, Steel Pulse and other post punk, ska and reggae bands. Public acceptance of the album was marginal, mostly due to the sub-standard mix that heavily diminished the album's power and originality.

In 1980, Rolling Stone magazine published a review of a concert where more column space was devoted to the opening act Skafish than to the headliner, The Stranglers.

While on this tour, the band filmed their segment for the Copeland/Lorimar production of Urgh! A Music War. The segment, shot at a Roman theater in Frejus France, featured the controversial song "Sign of the Cross". The band lineup for the movie was the same as the album, with the exception of Chicago bassist Lee Gatlin taking the place of Mazalan.

After Europe, the band did a few short U.S. tours, headlining and opening for acts such as Iggy Pop, The Stranglers and others. In 1983, they recorded a second IRS album, Conversation, at Pumpkin studios owned and operated by Gary Loizzo (two-time Grammy-nominated singer for The American Breed and producer for Chicago, Styx, Survivor and REO Speedwagon. Personnel were Skafish vocals and keys, Ken Bronowski guitar, Barbie Goodrich vocals, Javier Cruz keys, Lee Gatlin on bass and Larry Mysliwiec (who was currently touring drummer for Iggy Pop) on drums. Conversation, co-produced by Copeland, Skafish and Loizzo, broke from the post punk style of Skafish toward a beat-based dance style, and was not well accepted, commercially.

Following Conversation, the band did a few West Coast tours, and called it quits in 1985. Jim Skafish continued to perform as Skafish for a few years with a string of pickup musicians, eventually going solo.

== Later activities ==
Jim Skafish still records and performs in the Midwest. He produced a jazz style Christmas album (Tidings Of Comfort And Joy, 2006), and he promotes and distributes Skafish products, such as What's This? 1976-1979 (2007), to a small but loyal cult fan base. Mysliwiec is currently a Midwest policeman, Bronowski still performs, records and is currently a professor of AV production and art at Purdue University. Barbie Goodrich died on 10 June 1995 after a long battle with cancer. Up until his passing on April 18, 2020, Javier Cruz worked in the IT department of Jane Addams Elementary School in Chicago, and from time to time performed with the South Chicago cover band Life (of which Jim Skafish was a member for a time during the early 1980s).

== Discography ==
=== Albums ===
- Skafish IRS SP 008, I.R.S. Records (1980)
- Conversation IRS SP 70038, I.R.S. Records (1983)
- "Tidings Of Comfort And Joy: A Jazz Piano Trio Christmas," La Befana Records (2006)
- "What's This? 1976-1979" 829 Records (2008) 829 Records (2008)
- "Bootleg 21-35" 829 Records (2012; download only)

=== Singles ===
- "Obsessions of You"/"Sink or Swim" IRS IR9011, I.R.S. Records (1980)
- "Wild Night Tonight"/"Secret Lover & Lover In Masquerade" IRS SP 70967 (1983)

=== Compilations and soundtracks ===
- IRS Greatest Hits Vols 2 & 3 (SP 70800): features "Disgracing The Family Name"
- Urgh! A Music War (A&M SP6019): features "Sign Of The Cross (Live)"
- These People Are Nuts (IRS 82010): also features "Sign Of The Cross (Live)"

== Sources ==
- Gimarc, George (1997). Post Punk Diary, 1980-1982. New York: Knopf Books for Young Readers. ISBN 0-312-16968-X.
- Van Matre, Lynn (June 30, 1978). "Rock". Chicago Tribune. pp. B2.
- Donato, Marla (November 8, 1989). "Not just another pretty face, Jim Skafish tackles life with wicked glee". Chicago Tribune. pp. STYLE - 16.
