= Urgh! A Music War =

1982 film directed by Derek Burbidge

- Directed by: Derek Burbidge
- Produced by: Michael White
- Edited by: Jim Elderton
- Production company: Lorimar Productions
- Distributed by: Filmways
- Release date: 7 May 1982; (Los Angeles)
- Running time: 122 minutes
- Country: United Kingdom
- Language: English

Urgh! A Music War is a 1982 British concert film featuring performances by punk rock, new wave, and post-punk bands and artists. Filmed in August to September 1980 it was directed by Derek Burbidge and produced by Michael White and Lyndall Hobbs. Among the acts featured in the film are Orchestral Manoeuvres in the Dark (OMD), Magazine, the Go-Go's, Toyah Willcox, Joan Jett and the Blackhearts, X, XTC, Devo, the Cramps, Oingo Boingo, Dead Kennedys, Gary Numan, Klaus Nomi, Wall of Voodoo, Pere Ubu, Skafish, Steel Pulse, Surf Punks, 999, UB40, Echo & the Bunnymen and the Police. These were many of the most popular groups on the new wave scene; in keeping with the spirit of the scene, the film also features several less famous acts.

== Original release ==
Urgh! A Music War consists of a series of performances, without narration or explanatory text. All performances are live, recorded around 1980, mainly in London, Portsmouth, San Diego, Los Angeles, Santa Monica and New York. Clips were also taken from a concert in Fréjus, Var, France with the Police, XTC, Skafish, UB40 and Jools Holland.

In 1981, a year before release of the film, A&M Records released a double-album soundtrack. The selection of songs was almost the same as the film, but there were a few minor changes and several acts featured in the film did not make it to the album (Dead Kennedys, John Cooper Clarke, Chelsea, Surf Punks, Invisible Sex, Splodgenessabounds, UB40).

== Subsequent distribution ==
Urgh! A Music War was briefly released to theatres by Filmways Pictures through the summer of 1982, and later acquired a cult following in the United States later in the 1980s due to its frequent showings on the USA Network. It aired on VH1 Classic on 30 October 2006 as part of its Rock and Roll Picture series. The film has been released on videotape, CED, LaserDisc, and DVD.

Portions of Urgh! appear elsewhere in film and video: The Klaus Nomi clip "Total Eclipse" appears in the 2004 documentary The Nomi Song, and details of its filming are discussed. The 1982 documentary The Police: Around the World was also filmed by Derek Burbidge and features footage used in Urgh! as well as other footage filmed at the same concert. Joan Jett's "Bad Reputation" footage was used in the 2003 Blackheart Records DVD release of "Real Wild Child" Video Anthology. "Bad Reputation" (Audio only) was also issued on Blackheart Records 2006's Reissue of "Flashback".

In addition to recent cable showings, some remaining intact prints of the movie have toured the US in recent years (one tour sponsored by the humor periodical The Onion), and video showings in clubs and film houses have sparked a resurgence of interest in the film, which resulted in a DVD release by Warner Bros. as part of its Warner Archive series of DVD (and later Blu-ray) issues of their lesser-known titles from the WB vaults.

== Official DVD release ==
In August 2009, Warner Archive released an official DVD-R of the movie, which is burned on a made-to-order basis. As noted on the Warner Archive website, the movie has not been remastered or restored, but is presented in a 1.85:1 aspect ratio widescreen format. There is a trailer included, which is the only feature other than the film itself. There are no chapter indexes for the individual tracks, but rather 10-minute chapters. Splodgenessabounds' performance of "Two Little Boys" is omitted from the DVD, with the other original performances remaining. The DVD was only marketed for the United States.

== Track listing ==
1. Opening credits
2. The Police – "Driven to Tears"
3. Wall of Voodoo – "Back in Flesh"
4. Toyah Willcox – "Danced"
5. John Cooper Clarke – "Health Fanatic"
6. Orchestral Manoeuvres in the Dark – "Enola Gay"
7. Chelsea – "I'm on Fire"
8. Oingo Boingo – "Ain't This the Life"
9. Echo & the Bunnymen – "The Puppet"
10. Jools Holland – "Foolish I Know"
11. XTC – "Respectable Street"
12. Klaus Nomi – "Total Eclipse"
13. Athletico Spizz 80 – "Clocks Are Big; Machines Are Heavy/Where's Captain Kirk?"
14. The Go-Go's – "We Got the Beat"
15. Dead Kennedys – "Bleed for Me"
16. Steel Pulse – "Ku Klux Klan"
17. Gary Numan – "Down in the Park"
18. Joan Jett and the Blackhearts – "Bad Reputation"
19. Magazine – "Model Worker"
20. Surf Punks – "My Beach"
21. The Members – "Offshore Banking Business"
22. Au Pairs – "Come Again"
23. The Cramps – "Tear It Up"
24. Invisible Sex – "Valium"
25. Pere Ubu – "Birdies"
26. Devo – "Uncontrollable Urge"
27. The Alley Cats – "Nothing Means Nothing Anymore"
28. John Otway – "Cheryl's Going Home"
29. Gang of Four – "He'd Send in the Army"
30. 999 – "Homicide"
31. The Fleshtones – "Shadowline"
32. X – "Beyond and Back"
33. Skafish – "Sign of the Cross"
34. Splodgenessabounds – "Two Little Boys" (Not included on the Warner's DVD)
35. UB40 – "Madame Medusa"
36. The Police – "Roxanne"
37. The Police – "So Lonely"
38. Klaus Nomi – "Aria" ("Mon cœur s'ouvre à ta voix" from Camille Saint-Saëns' opera Samson and Delilah) (End credits)

== Original soundtrack LP and cassette track listing ==
The original 1981 soundtrack was released as both a double LP (A&M SP-6019 in the U.S., SP 96019 in Canada, and AMLM 66019 in Europe) and double cassette (CS-6019 in the U.S.). Each contained the following track listing:

Side 1

1. The Police – "Driven to Tears"
2. Wall of Voodoo – "Back in Flesh"
3. Toyah Willcox – "Danced"
4. Orchestral Manoeuvres in the Dark – "Enola Gay"
5. Oingo Boingo – "Ain't This the Life"
6. XTC – "Respectable Street"

Side 2

1. The Members – "Offshore Banking Business"
2. Go-Go's – "We Got the Beat"
3. Klaus Nomi – "Total Eclipse"
4. Athletico Spizz '80 – "Where's Captain Kirk"
5. Alley Cats – "Nothing Means Nothing Anymore"
6. Jools Holland – "Foolish I Know"
7. Steel Pulse – "Ku Klux Klan"

Side 3

1. Devo – "Uncontrollable Urge"
2. Echo and the Bunnymen – "The Puppet"
3. The Au Pairs – "Come Again"
4. The Cramps – "Tear It Up"
5. Joan Jett & The Blackhearts – "Bad Reputation"
6. Pere Ubu – "Birdies"
7. Gary Numan – "Down in the Park"

Side 4

1. Fleshtones – "Shadow Line"
2. Gang of Four – "He'd Send in the Army"
3. John Otway – "Cheryl's Going Home"
4. 999 – "Homicide"
5. X – "Beyond and Back"
6. Magazine – "Model Worker"
7. Skafish – "Sign of the Cross"

According to the official site of Toyah Willcox, the artist was credited incorrectly as ‘Toyah Wilcox’ and the song listed as ‘Dance’ instead of ‘Danced’.

== CD track listing ==
At some later date, presumably in the 1980s, the soundtrack was released on CD (A&M CD 6019 in the U.S.). The accompanying booklet states, "This is an abridged version of the original album and cassette releases." The disc omits seven performances: those by Toyah Willcox, the Members, Athletico Spizz '80, Alley Cats, the Au Pairs, John Otway, and the Dead Kennedys.

The track listing for the CD is:

1. The Police – "Driven to Tears"
2. Wall of Voodoo – "Back in Flesh"
3. Orchestral Manoeuvres in the Dark – "Enola Gay"
4. Oingo Boingo – "Ain't This the Life"
5. XTC – "Respectable Street"
6. Go Go's – "We Got the Beat"
7. Klaus Nomi – "Total Eclipse"
8. Jools Holland – "Foolish I Know"
9. Steel Pulse – "Ku Klux Klan"
10. Devo – "Uncontrollable Urge"
11. Echo and the Bunnymen – "The Puppet"
12. The Cramps – "Tear It Up"
13. Joan Jett & The Blackhearts – "Bad Reputation"
14. Pere Ubu – "Birdies"
15. Gary Numan – "Down in the Park"
16. The Fleshtones – "Shadow Line" (listed as "Shadow-line")
17. Gang of Four – "He'd Send in the Army"
18. 999 – "Homicide"
19. X – "Beyond and Back"
20. Magazine – "Model Worker"
21. Skafish – "Sign of the Cross"
