= Man Parrish (album) =

Studio album by Man Parrish
- Released: 1982
- Studio: Man Made Productions
- Label: Importe/12
- Producers: Raul A. Rodriguez, Man Parrish

Man Parrish is a 1982 studio album by Man Parrish. It was released on the label Importe/12, a subsidiary of popular dance imprint label Sugarscoop. The album originally began development from various electronic experiments Man Parrish experimented with making soundscape electronic records which led to him making connections in his home of New York to record music for a pornographic film. The music in the film was later bootlegged and played in clubs leading him to connect with a studio who wanted him to record an album. The record went on to sell about 2 million copies worldwide.

== Background and production ==
=== Background ===
Man Parrish grew up in Brooklyn New York, where he developed his musical foundation listening to funk music. At the same time, he was going to high school for the performing arts which would lead him to listening to opera one night and the next listening to groups like Kool & the Gang. Man Parrish became interested in electronic music through groups like Tonto's Expanding Head Band and experimental artists like Karlheinz Stockhausen. Man Parrish then went to a Radio Shack and purchased a synthesizer kit and began recording music, using tape recorders to make soundscape recordings.

At the age of 14, he left home and began spending time at New York's underground scene at clubs like Mudd Club and meeting people like Klaus Nomi. On meeting Nomi, Man Parrish would buy more synthesizers leading to people to visit Man Parrish's home to do demos.

=== Production ===
A friend of Man Parrish's, Joe Gage, had connections with someone developing a porn film and needed music for it. This led to Man Parrish recording two tracks for the film including a title track for the film ("Heatstroke"). Man Parrish would later discover about six months later that "Heatstroke" had been playing in underground clubs in New York.

After finding a club that was performing his song, he approached the DJ who made connections with him to get to a record label in New York who were looking for Man Parrish.

On meeting with the record label, Man Parrish was asked to show what other music he had and he played "Man Made", "Hip Hop Be Bop (Don't Stop)" and a few other tracks that would appear on the album. Man Parrish was 22 years old when he signed a deal to release the album, and later admitted that he "didn't know what [he] was doing."

== Release ==
Man Parrish was released in 1982 on the Importe label, a subsidiary of popular dance imprint Sugarscoop. In the United States, the album charted on Top Black Albums peaking at number 43 on April 2, 1983.

The first single released from the album was "Hip Hop, Be Bop (Don't Stop)," which Parrish said faced a racial backlash from the African-American hip hop community: "I was making the music that they played, and then they found out I was white and gay they pulled it. It didn't hurt sales but it was shocking." The album went on to sell over two million copies worldwide.

Man Parrish explained that his music was later sold by his label to Unidisc in Canada for $1,000, where Man Parrish's signature was forged on a piece of paper. Parrish recalls that he often sees compilation CDs and records with his music on it such as the video game Grand Theft Auto: Vice City and the film Shaun of the Dead.

== Reception ==
Professional ratings
Review scores
Source	Rating
AllMusic	4/5 stars
The Baltimore Sun	4/5 stars
Record Mirror	3.5/5 stars

From contemporary reviews, Brian Chin of Billboard compared the album to Kraftwerk's Computer World, stating that Kraftwerk's album will be "hard pressed to match the high humor and serious groove" of Man Parrish. Chin specifically praised the single "Hip Hop, Be Bop (Don't Stop)" and the "Together Again" while finding the last two tracks "Street Clap" and "Heatstroke" "bring Europop and gay disco break together with a bang: interesting juxtaposition to say the least." Ken Tucker praised the single "Hip Hop Be Bop (Don't Stop)" with the rhythm being as "charmingly herky-jerky as that title" while finding that "the rest of the album is thin, but there are a couple of nice novelty tunes, especially "Six Simple Synthesizers"" J.D. Considine gave the album a four out of five-star rating, declaring that "Hip Hop, Be Bop (Don't Stop)" was "a masterpiece of electronic sound sculpting" but the rest of the album "rarely scales such heights" as "Mr. Parrish has the insight to sandwich less vital material like "mad Made" or "Together Again" between versions of "Hip Hop," so that the context makes the weaker songs seem more like respites than mistakes." Paul Sexton of Record Mirror gave the album a three and a half star rating out of five, stating that nothing on the record matched the 'excitement' of "Hip Hop (Be Bop)", but there was "still some fun in this sort of electrickery." Iman Lababedi of Creem described the album as a "tantalizing, wildly uneven debut " finding it not as strong as "Hip Hop (Be Bop)", stating "I love the single, think "Together Again"'s restrained calypso is delicious, am bored stiff by the twee 'Man Made' and insulted by the filler-only 'Techno Trax'". Man Parrish discussed the album in the November 1983 issue of Creem, stating "I have problems with some of [the album] too. When I started in the studio with the album I was very new to the studio. It was kind of a learning experience."

From retrospective reviews, Sean Cooper of AllMusic gave the album four stars out of five, noting that the album "hasn't stood up very well" with the exception of "Hip-Hop Be Bop (Don't Stop)" which was "almost impossible to hear [...] too many times" while "Man Made" is a lost classic nearly the equal of Parrish's best-known work."

== Track listing ==
All songs are composed by Man Parrish except where noted.

No.	Title	Writer(s)	Length
1.	"Hip Hop, Be Bop (Don't Stop)"	Man Parrish, Raul A. Rodriguez, John Robie	5:36
2.	"In the Beginning"	Parrish, Rodriguez	1:00
3.	"Man Made"	Parrish, Rodriguez	5:01
4.	"Together Again"	Parrish, M. Rudetsky	3:36
5.	"Hip Hop, Be Bop (Part 2)"	Parrish, Rodriguez, Robie	3:11
6.	"Six Simple Synthesizers"		5:37
7.	"Techno Trax"		4:12
8.	"Street Clap"		2:11
9.	"Heatstroke"		5:34

== Personnel ==
Credits are adapted from the sleeve, sticker and back cover of Man Parrish.

- Man Parrish – producer, vocals, keyboards
- Raul A. Rodriguez – producer
- Mark Berry – additional mix engineering
- Herbie Powers, Jr. – mastering
- Jim Shelton – plating
- Klaus Nomi – additional vocals (on "Six Simple Synthesizers")
- Cherry Vanilla – additional vocals (on "Together Again")
- Michael Harron – additional vocals (on "Together Again")
- Michael Rudetsky – additional vocals (on "Together Again")
- The Rain Sisters – additional vocals (on "Heatstroke")
- John Robie – additional keyboards (on "Hip Hop, Be Bop (Don't Stop)")
- Robbie Kilgore – additional keyboards (on "Six Simple Synthesizers", "Man Made" and "Heatstroke")
- James McElwaine – saxophone (on "Together Again")
- Steve Kroon – additional percussion (on "Six Simple Synthesizers" and "Heatstroke")
