= Keith McDermott =

American actor, novelist

- Born: September 28, 1953 (age 72); Houston, Texas, U.S.
- Education: Ohio University
- Partner: Eric Amouyal

Keith McDermott (born September 28, 1953) is an American actor, theater director, and writer.

== Life and career ==
McDermott was born September 28, 1953, in Houston, Texas, the son of Betty Ray (Rees) and James E. McDermott. McDermott graduated from Ohio University Theatre School. In the 1970s, he lived with author Edmund White in New York City, and appeared as Alan Strang in Equus on Broadway opposite Richard Burton. He directs theater productions, and is particularly known for his direction of Off-Off-Broadway comedies penned by avant garde playwright Jim Neu. McDermott appeared in the Hollywood movie Without a Trace, as well as in numerous independent films, including as half the title role in Ignatz & Lotte and a small but very important role in the cult horror Tourist Trap. His novel Acqua Calda was inspired by his long-term friendship and collaboration with director Robert Wilson, and his memoir of former long-time boyfriend Joe Brainard appeared in the anthology Loss Within Loss. His other memoir and fiction has appeared in periodicals, as well as in the anthology Boys Like Us.

== Filmography ==
Television and Film
Year	Title	Role	Notes
1979	Tourist Trap	Woody	(Film)
1979	How the West Was Won	Everett	(TV Series), 1 episode: "The Rustler"
1983	Without a Trace	Philippe	(Film)
1995	Ignatz & Lotte	Ignatz	(Film)
1999	A Slipping-Down Life	Paul Ogle	(Film)
2008	Birds of America	Man in Street	(Film)
2013	I Fell Into a Black Hole While Searching For My Double	Keith	(Film)
2013-2014	Off-Awful	Rupert	(TV Series), 2 episodes: "Acting Class" and "Cocktail Hour"
2014	Recourse	Dr. Brown	(Short Film)
2017	Human Resources	Bill	(Film)
2018	Bennifer	Bennifer	(Short)

== Theater ==
Year	Title	Author	Notes
1974	Equus	Alan Strang	At the Plymouth Theatre
1979	A Meeting by the River	Tom	
1980	Harold and Maude	Harold	

== Bibliography ==
- Acqua Calda, Carroll & Graf Publishers
- Lessons from Our Fathers, Durban House Publishing, due Oct 2006

== See also ==
- LGBT culture in New York City
- List of LGBT people from New York City
- NYC Pride March
