= American Cinema Editors Awards 2012 =

62nd ACE Eddie Awards
- Presented by: American Cinema Editors
- Date: February 18, 2012
- Site: The Beverly Hilton, Beverly Hills, California

Highlights
- Best Film: Drama: The Descendants
- Best Film: Musical or Comedy: The Artist

The 62nd American Cinema Editors Eddie Awards, which were presented on February 18, 2012 at The Beverly Hilton hotel, honored the best editors in films and television.

Nominees were announced on January 11, 2012.

== Winners ==
=== Film ===
Category	Recipient	Film
Best Edited Feature Film – Dramatic	Kevin Tent	The Descendants
Best Edited Feature Film – Comedy or Musical	Anne-Sophie Bion and Michel Hazanavicius	The Artist
Best Edited Animated Feature Film	Craig Wood	Rango
Best Edited Documentary	Lewis Erskine and Aljernon Tunsil	Freedom Riders

=== Television ===
Category	Recipient	Film
Best Edited Half-Hour Series for Television	Steven Rasch	Curb Your Enthusiasm for "Palestinian Chicken"
Best Edited One-Hour Series – Commercial Television	Skip MacDonald	Breaking Bad for "Face Off"
Best Edited One-Hour Series – Non-Commercial Television	Jordan Goldman and David Latham	Homeland for "Pilot"
Best Edited Miniseries or Film	Sarah Flack and Robert Pulcini	Cinema Verite
Best Edited Reality Series	Eric Lasby	Anthony Bourdain: No Reservations for "Haiti"

Student Competition: Eric Kench - Video Symphony
