= Jim Neu =

American dramatist

James A. Neu (November 18, 1943 – July 19, 2010) was an American playwright who was best known for his quirky, experimental plays, many of which were staged Off-Off-Broadway.

Neu was born on November 18, 1943, in Brooklyn and moved to Huntington, New York with his family when he was seven years old. He graduated from State University of New York at Oneonta and was drafted into the United States Army, where he was stationed in South Korea during the Vietnam War. As he described in his biography, he was "unlucky enough to be drafted after graduating college, but lucky enough not to be sent to Viet Nam".

After completing his military service in 1967, he moved to Manhattan's Lower East Side, beginning a "quest for self" that many went through in that period. At a friend's suggestion, he attended a workshop with avant-garde theatrical director Robert Wilson in 1970. Wilson was looking for actors with no prior theater experience, and Neu became involved with Wilson's work as a performer with the Byrd Hoffman School of Byrds troupe and as a contributor to some of his plays. Neu started a career writing plays of his own, many of which were staged at Ellen Stewart's La MaMa Experimental Theatre Club. Neu would often appear in his own works and was fond of including jazz riffs from Duke Ellington and Thelonious Monk. Works he staged include his 1995 play The Floatones, Mondo Beyondo in 1997 and 1999's Undercurrent Incorporated. In a 2001 collaboration with choreographer Douglas Dunn, Neu presented Aerobia, his first dance theater production, which told the story of six characters at a health club of the future where people come to exercise their "sociomuscularity". In what The New York Times called "a brief but engaging torrent of intriguing ideas and dizzying wordplay" that "rewards repeat viewing", his 2008 production of Gang of Seven directed by frequent collaborator Keith McDermott featured seven stage cliche characters who are part of a focus group for an unidentified product interacting with each other using marketing neologisms. Andrew Horn directed two screenplays he wrote, the feature films Doomed Love in 1983 and The Big Blue in 1988.

A resident of Carroll Gardens, Brooklyn, Neu died at his home there at age 66 on July 19, 2010, due to lung cancer. He was survived by his wife, Carol Mullins.
