= The Nomi Song =

- Theatrical release poster
- Directed by: Andrew Horn
- Written by: Andrew Horn
- Release date: 6 February 2004
- Running time: 96 minutes (98 outside of Germany)
- Country: Germany
- Languages: German and English

The Nomi Song is a 2004 Documentary film about the life of singer Klaus Nomi, written and directed by Andrew Horn. The film debuted at the Berlin International Film Festival in February 2004, where it won a Teddy Award for "Best Documentary Film."

== Structure ==
Through interviews with Nomi's collaborators and family members, the documentary lightly brushes on the early life of Klaus Sperber before settling into the five-year period depicting the German singer's reinvention of himself as Klaus Nomi, his rise to fame in New York, his break into the international music market and his death from complications of AIDS in 1983. In addition to interview footage and still photography, the film features archival footage of Nomi performances. The film features East Village personalities such as Ann Magnuson and Kristian Hoffman, as well as songs by artists such as The Bongos, Marbles, the Mumps, and David Bowie.

== Critical reception ==
In his review, Entertainment Weekly's Owen Gleiberman described the documentary as "loving and meticulous", giving the film an A−. MTV's Kurt Loder dubbed it "strange and fascinating". In its review of the film, The Advocate called it "engaging", indicating at the DVD release that "New Wave countertenor Klaus Nomi gets his posthumous due in this acclaimed doc."

On review aggregator website Rotten Tomatoes, the film holds an approval rating of 94% based on 36 reviews, with an average rating of 7.1/10.

== DVD features ==
The DVD includes numerous bonus features, including remixes of Nomi songs by Richard Barone, Ana Matronic of the Scissor Sisters, The Moog Cookbook, and Man Parrish.
