= Michael Halsband =

American photographer

- Born: New York City, U.S.
- Occupations: Photographer; video music director; film director
- Years active: 1978–present
- Website: michaelhalsband.com

Michael Halsband is an American photographer. He makes portraits of celebrities, from musicians to artists, and produces work for fashion and lifestyle publications. He has also directed short films, music videos and commercials.

== Early life and education ==
Michael Halsband was born in 1956 in New York City. He grew up in Manhattan and at age 10 became interested in photography as a hobby. He took photography classes in high school. In college, he studied psychology but found himself unhappy with his path. When his mother suggested art school, Halsband showed his portfolio of drawings to the School of Visual Arts (SVA) in New York City, but they did not feel his drawing was up to par. When asked if he had anything else to show, Halsband brought them photographs he had made from age 10 to 19 and was accepted into the photography program in 1976. Halsband graduated in 1980 with a Bachelor of Fine Arts degree. Part of his senior thesis at the School of Visual Arts was a series of portraits of singer Klaus Nomi, one of which ended up as the album cover for Nomi's 1981 eponymous debut album.

== Photographic career ==
=== Early beginnings ===
Halsband began photographing professionally in 1978, while still attending SVA. By 1979, he had made enough money to buy his own studio, the Michael Halsband Studio. Among the people Halsband photographed at that time were artist Andy Warhol, musicians David Byrne, Alan Vega, James Brown, Jim Carroll, Peter Tosh, and Lydia Lunch, and Penthouse founder Bob Guccione. He also continued to work for magazines including Interview, Avenue and Rolling Stone.

=== Fashion ===
Halsband spent most of the 1980s as a fashion photographer for various magazines, including Vogue, Mademoiselle, Glamour, Self, Esquire, GQ, and House & Garden, as well as working on international ad campaigns for Gap, J.Crew, Barneys, Pepsi, and press kits for designers Calvin Klein and Adrienne Vittadini.

=== Tour photographer ===
In the summer of 1981, Halsband got an assignment to photograph Keith Richards of the Rolling Stones for the cover of Rolling Stone magazine, and consequently ended up as tour photographer for the Rolling Stones' American Tour in 1981. He would work once again with the band in 1994 on their Voodoo Lounge Tour. In 1982, Halsband went on tour with the Who on their Farewell Tour of North America. He served as photographer on AC/DC's 1996 Ballbreaker World Tour and the Stiff Upper Lip World Tour between 2000 and 2001, as well as photographing the promotions and advertising.

=== Other work ===
In 1985, Halsband created a double portrait of artists Andy Warhol and Jean-Michel Basquiat pictured side-by-side and wearing boxing trunks and gloves. Halsband was asked by Basquiat to photograph the poster for his and Warhol's collaborative exhibition "Paintings". The image of the two artists, with their arms crossed over their chests, is only one photograph from a series of more than 10 rolls of film. The other photographs show the artists together and individually.

In 1986, Halsband was approached by dancewear manufacturer Danskin to do an ad campaign with the School of American Ballet (SAB), capturing the rehearsals and the class-atmosphere of ballet.

In 1991, after SAB, Halsband began a five-year personal project on portraits of strippers and sex industry workers. Reading books on the subject, Halsband looked at how nude photography and erotica had been represented in both America and Europe. "I came to the conclusion that there was a lot of lying going on in nude photography," Halsband said in 2010. "I decided that I was going to be really honest. I wanted to find out how women like sex. I wanted them to control the picture while I served the medium as the photographer."

When author Hunter S. Thompson invited actor Johnny Depp to join him on a week-long visit to Cuba in 1999, Halsband was assigned by Rolling Stone magazine to document the trip. As a result, Halsband was written into Thompson's 2003 book, Kingdom of Fear.

== Books ==
Halsband released the book Surf Book in 2005. It is a collaborative book project with professional surfer Joel Tudor, which began in 1999. Halsband has called it "a portrait of surfing, through the people who have influenced it spiritually and technologically over the past 50 years."

His second book, Halsband Portraits from 2015, is an accompaniment to the National Arts Club exhibition in New York City titled "Halsband Portraits: Portraits from 1979 – Present". The book consists of portraits of musicians and artists such as Warhol, Basquiat, Keith Richards, Mick Jagger, and LeRoy Neiman.

== Collections ==
Work by Halsband are held in the permanent collection of the Museum of Fine Arts Houston, the Parrish Art Museum, and the SCAD Museum of Art.

== Directing ==
=== Music videos ===
In the 1990s, Halsband directed music videos for, among others, blues musician Taj Mahal, R&B singer Kenny Lattimore, Nuno Bettencourt of rock band Extreme, and Psychedelic Furs offshoot Love Spit Love.

=== Surf Movie: reels 1–14 ===
Between 1999 and 2004, Halsband traveled the world with surfer Joel Tudor taking photographs for their collaborative book project Surf Book (2005), as well as filming Super-8 footage that would become the 48-minute short film Surf Movie: reels 1–14, released in 2002. The film is a collection of 14 reels of footage, straight from the camera and unedited, that Halsband shot of Tudor and other professional surfers such as Beau Young, Kelly Slater and Rob Machado. It features an original musical score by guitarist Richard Fortus.

=== The Water Dancer ===
The surfwear brand Quiksilver commissioned Halsband to shoot and direct three short films with professional surfer Stephanie Gilmore titled The Water Dancer, released on January 12, 2012. In the films, Gilmore is paired with three professional female dancers: choreographer Noémie Lafrance, ballet dancer Tiler Peck and hip hop dancer Casandra "Defy" Rivera, with the intention to explore the similarities between surfing and dancing.

=== Growing Farmers ===
Growing Farmers is a 16-minute-long documentary film, shot and directed by Halsband, and produced in conjunction with the Peconic Land Trust. The film deals with the challenges of young aspiring Long Island farmers, such as the issue of affordable farmland and the industry's future. Growing Farmers premiered at the Hamptons International Film Festival in October 2012, winning the festival's Audience Choice award.

== Personal life ==
Halsband began playing the guitar when he was 10 years old and "couldn't get enough of it, and I couldn't play very well either", he said in 2015. "I was so frustrated, but I passionately loved music." Halsband cites the Rolling Stones and AC/DC as among his favorite bands.

== Filmography ==
=== Music videos ===
Year	Song	Artist	Album	Credit	Ref.
1994	Soulsville	Shä-Key	A Head Nädda's Journey to Adidi Skizm	Director, 2nd camera	
1994	Change in the Weather	Love Spit Love	Love Spit Love	Director, 2nd camera	
1995	The Creator Has a Master Plan	Brooklyn Funk Essentials	Cool and Steady and Easy	Director, 2nd camera	
1996	Never Too Busy	Kenny Lattimore	Kenny Lattimore	Director	
1997	Crave	Nuno Bettencourt	Schizophonic	Director	
1997	Mr. Pitiful	Taj Mahal	Señor Blues	Director	
1997	Nothing but Strife	Coolbone	Brass-Hop	Director, 2nd camera	
