= Man 2 Man =

American hi-NRG band

Man 2 Man (later known as Man to Man) was an American hi-NRG band from New York City that formed in the early 1980s. It was best known for their hit singles "Male Stripper", "Energy Is Eurobeat" and "I Need a Man".

== Beginnings: The Fast ==
The Fast was an American glam/punk band formed in New York City in the mid-1970s by brothers Miki Zone and Mandy Zone, along with Tommie Moonie (bass) and Peter Hoffman (drum).

With the addition of third brother Paul Zone in 1975, the Fast was an integral/influential part of the Max's Kansas City/CBGB scene alongside Blondie and the Ramones, with their blend of power pop and garage punk. As the New York punk rock scene was in its infancy, the Fast were a headline act at Max's Kansas City and CBGB in New York City.

The Fast's first single, "Boys Will Be Boys" (CBS Records UK) was released in 1976 and was produced by Peter Crowley. "Boys Will Be Boys" as well as "Wow Pow Bash Crash" were released on the Max's Kansas City (Ram Records) release "Max's Kansas City 1976" along with other acts Wayne (now Jayne) County & the Backstreet Boys, Suicide, Pere Ubu and others. The Fast's sound and style was developed with 1960s mod pop elements and the use of synthesizers just before the instrument became a staple of new wave music.

Their second single "It's Like Love" (Ram Records) was released in 1977 and produced by Richard Gottehrer (Blondie/The Go-Go's/the Strangeloves/Raveonettes). "It's Like Love" was a blending of electronic synth sounds and bubblegum pop. The B-side was "Kids Just Wanna Dance". It was also during this time that Tommie Moonie left the band and was replaced by Hoffmann's brother, Robert.

This line up lasted for a year till 1978 when Mandy Zone left the band to form his own band, Ozone, along with former bassist Tommie Moonie. Peter and Robert Hoffman decided not to carry on with the band, so they were replaced by Joe Poliseno on drums and Louis Bova (who was a recording engineer on the "Max's Kansas City 1976" album) on bass. For a short time, the Fast changed the name of the band to Miki Zone Zoo to signify a drastic change to the band sound, but after a few months reverted to the Fast due to name recognition.

In 1978/1979, the Fast toured the United States. Ric Ocasek, after seeing the band perform at the Boston rock club The Rathskeller (The Rat), decided to have them open up for the Cars at their next stadium show in Portland, Maine. Ocasek also decided to produce for and have them record at famed Electric Ladyland studio in NYC which wound up as half of their first LP The Fast for Sale (Recca Records), released in 1980.

In 1981, their second LP, Leather Boys from the Asphalt Jungle (Recca Records), was released. This would be the last time Paul and Miki Zone recorded with a live band. In 1982, the Fast went electronic; Paul and Miki toured the U.S. East Coast with two back-up keyboard players. In 1983, they began performing as a duo at New York City's Harrah, S.N.A.F.U., The Pyramid Club, and The Mudd Club, using keyboards, electronics and backing tapes.

=== The Fast discography ===
- "Boys Will Be Boys" (Single, CBS Records UK) 1976
- "It's Like Love" / "Kids Just Wanna Dance" (Single, Ram Records) 1977
- "B Movies" / "Cars Crash" (Single, Sounds Interesting Records) 1979
- "The Fast for Sale" (LP, Recca Records) 1980
- "Leather Boys from the Asphalt Jungle" (LP, Recca Records) 1981
- "Moontan" / "Love Is Like an Itchin in My Heart" (Single, Recca Record) 1982

== Man 2 Man ==
After the Fast, the Zone brothers spent the first half of the 1980s singing on a number of hi-NRG and disco records for record producers such as Bobby Orlando (records like Divine's "Native Love" and the Flirts' "Passion"). Soon after, they formed a new band, which was originally called Man's Favourite Sports. However, another band had already claimed the right to use this name, so they became known as Man 2 Man.

Man 2 Man performed live in some of NYC's larger dance spaces: The Funhouse, The Limelight, & The Saint. They also appeared live at Heaven in London, UK. The duo recorded self-produced 12-inch dance singles through 1985. They continued to perform as a live act, touring alongside Sylvester & Divine in mid-to large sized venues throughout the UK, South America and Mexico.

=== "Male Stripper" ===
Under this name the band scored their biggest hit, "Male Stripper", teaming up with cult electro producer Man Parrish. Originally released in the United Kingdom in August 1986 on the Bolts Records label, "Male Stripper" was a big club hit throughout the autumn and peaked at No. 64 on the UK Singles Chart in September. Miki Zone died of spinal meningitis caused by AIDS on December 31, 1986.

In early 1987, "Male Stripper" charted again in the UK, and this time the song became an even bigger hit, spending five weeks in the top 10 and two weeks at No. 4. The song peaked at number 3 in Australia. "Male Stripper" was a breakout crossover pop hit and in March 1987 Man 2 Man appeared on a segment of the British music TV show Top of the Pops. "Male Stripper" was featured in the 1988 British film The Fruit Machine.

The next single, "Who Knows What Evil", reached No. 90 on the UK chart in April 1987.

After the death of Miki, Paul Zone decided to change the band name to Man to Man and recorded a cover version of the Grace Jones hit "I Need a Man" which peaked at No. 43 on the UK chart.

Paul Zone continued recording under this name into the 1990s, working with producers such as Jacques Morali. "I'll Try Anything Once" was released in 2008 on iTunes and featured vocals by Debbie Harry of Blondie.

== Discography ==
=== Albums ===
- Malenergy (Mexico only, 1986)
- Man to Man (with Paul Zone, 1988)
- Male Stripper - The Best Of (1995)
- Male Stripper: Hits & Rarities 1985–1990 (2007)

=== Singles ===
Year	Song	Chart positions		Certifications
Year	Song	AUS	UK	Certifications
1986	"Male Stripper" (with Man Parrish)	3	4	BPI: Silver
1986	"Who Knows What Evil"	—	90	
1987	"I Need a Man"	—	43	
1987	"Hard-Hitting Love"	—	—	
1987	"At the Gym"	—	—	
1987	"These Boots Are Made for Walking" (with Jessica Williams)	—	—	
1988	"New York City Beat"	—	—	
1988	"Cuba"	—	—	
"—" denotes releases that did not chart.
