= Klaus Nomi =

German countertenor (1944–1983)

- Nomi in 1979

Background information
- Born: Klaus Sperber; 24 January 1944; Immenstadt, Bavaria, Greater German Reich
- Died: 6 August 1983 (aged 39) New York City, U.S.
- Genres: New wave; synthpop; opera; experimental; baroque; disco; rock; post-punk (early)
- Occupations: Singer, songwriter, musician, performance artist
- Years active: 1978–1983
- Label: RCA
- Website: klausnomi.net

Klaus Sperber (24 January 1944 – 6 August 1983), known professionally as Klaus Nomi, was a German countertenor and baritone noted for his wide vocal range and an unusual, otherworldly stage persona.

In the 1970s, Nomi immersed himself in the East Village No Wave art scene. He was known for his bizarre and visionary theatrical live performances, heavy make-up, unusual costumes, and a highly stylized signature hairdo that flaunted a receding hairline. His songs were equally unusual, ranging from synthesizer-laden interpretations of classical opera to post-punk covers of 1960s pop standards like Chubby Checker's "The Twist" and Lou Christie's "Lightnin' Strikes". Nomi was one of David Bowie's backing singers for a 1979 performance on Saturday Night Live.

== Life and career ==
=== Early years ===
Klaus Nomi was born Klaus Sperber in Immenstadt, Bavaria, on January 24, 1944. He was raised by his single mother, Bettina Sperber, who had fled Essen, Rhine Province, for the Allgäu due to Allied bombing during World War II. His father was a soldier in the German Army with whom Bettina had a brief relationship during his furlough; he died from influenza before Nomi's birth. At age four, he and his mother moved back to the Ruhr, first to Fröndenberg before returning to Essen. Nomi grew up listening to classical music, gaining an interest in opera from listening to soprano Maria Callas over the radio, but also became fascinated with pop rock, buying Elvis Presley records with money he stole from his mother. Inspired by Callas, he developed a six octave vocal range and in the mid-1960s, he moved to West Berlin to study at Berlin University of the Arts, but as the school did not offer countertenor courses at the time, he trained to be a baritone. As he did not believe that earning a living on a musical career alone was feasible, Nomi took an apprenticeship as a pastry chef and worked as an usher at the Deutsche Oper, where he sang for the other ushers and maintenance crew on stage in front of the fire curtain after performances. He also sang opera arias at the Berlin gay discothèque Kleist-Kasino, under the stage name "Renata Castrata".

Nomi emigrated to New York City in 1972. He appeared in some off-Broadway theater work and operated a pastry shop as a day job. In 1977, Nomi appeared in a satirical camp production of Richard Wagner's Das Rheingold at Charles Ludlam's Ridiculous Theater Company as the Rheinmaidens and the Wood Bird. In October 1978, he took the artistic name "NOMI", initially as a mononym before rendering it as "Nomi" and adopting it as a last name. It stood as an anagram for "omni" ("all" or "every"), after the then-newly released science fiction magazine Omni.

=== Music career ===
Nomi came to the attention of the East Village art scene on November 2, 1978 with his performance in "New Wave Vaudeville", a four-night event at Irving Plaza MC'd by artist David McDermott. Dressed in a skin-tight spacesuit with a clear plastic cape, Nomi sang the aria "Mon cœur s'ouvre à ta voix" ("My heart opens to your voice") from Camille Saint-Saëns' opera Samson et Dalila. The performance ended with a chaotic crash of strobe lights, smoke bombs, and loud electronic sound effects as Nomi backed away into the smoke. Joey Arias recalled: "I still get goose pimples when I think about it ... It was like he was from a different planet and his parents were calling him home. When the smoke cleared, he was gone." After that performance Nomi was invited to perform at clubs all over New York City.

At the New Wave Vaudeville show Nomi met Kristian Hoffman, a songwriter for the Mumps. Hoffman was a performer and MC in the second incarnation of New Wave Vaudeville and a close friend of Susan Hannaford and Tom Scully, who produced the show, and Ann Magnuson, who directed it. Anya Phillips, then manager of James Chance and the Contortions, suggested Nomi and Hoffman form a band. Hoffman became Nomi's de facto musical director, assembling a band that included Page Wood from another New Wave vaudeville act, Come On, and Joe Katz, who would later join The Student Teachers, The Mumps, and the Swinging Madisons (the latter two with Hoffman).

Hoffman helped Nomi choose his pop covers, including the Lou Christie song "Lightnin' Strikes". Hoffman wrote several pop songs with which Nomi is closely identified: "The Nomi Song", "Total Eclipse", "After The Fall", and "Simple Man", the title song of Nomi's second RCA French LP. This configuration of the Klaus Nomi band performed at Manhattan clubs, including several performances at Max's Kansas City, Danceteria, Hurrah and the Mudd Club. He also appeared on Manhattan Cable's TV Party.

Disagreements with the management Nomi engaged led to the dissolution of this band, and Nomi continued without them. In the late 1970s, while performing at Club 57, The Mudd Club, the Pyramid Club, and other venues, Nomi assembled various up-and-coming models, singers, artists, and musicians to perform live with him, including Joey Arias, Keith Haring, John Sex and Kenny Scharf. He was briefly involved with Jean-Michel Basquiat, then known for his graffiti art as SAMO.

Nomi and Arias were at the Mudd Club when they were introduced to David Bowie, who hired them as performers and backing singers for his appearance on Saturday Night Live on December 15, 1979. They performed "TVC 15", "The Man Who Sold the World", and "Boys Keep Swinging". During the performance of "TVC 15", Nomi and Arias dragged around a large prop pink poodle with a television screen in its mouth. Nomi was so impressed with the plastic quasi-tuxedo suit that Bowie wore during "The Man Who Sold the World" that he commissioned one for himself. He wore the suit on the cover of his self-titled album, as well as during a number of his music videos. Nomi wore his variant of the outfit, in monochromatic black-and-white with spandex and makeup to match, until the last few months of his life.

Nomi married a woman named Melissa Moon sometime in 1980 in order to get a green card and remain in the US.

Nomi played a supporting role as a Nazi official in Anders Grafstrom's 1980 underground film The Long Island Four.

The 1981 rock documentary film Urgh! A Music War features Nomi's live performance of "Total Eclipse". His performance of "Mon cœur s'ouvre à ta voix" was used for the closing credits. In the liner notes of Nomi's 1981 self-titled record, 666 Fifth Avenue was listed as the contact address.

He released his second album, Simple Man, in November 1982. He also collaborated with producer Man Parrish, appearing on Parrish's 1982 album Man Parrish as a backup vocalist on the track "Six Simple Synthesizers".

In the last several months of his life, Nomi changed his focus to operatic pieces and adopted a Baroque era operatic outfit complete with full collar as his typical onstage attire. The collar helped cover the outbreaks of Kaposi's sarcoma on his neck, one of the numerous AIDS-related diseases Nomi developed toward the end of his life.

Za Bakdaz, a suite of home-studio recordings circa 1979 restored by Page Wood and George Elliott, was released posthumously in 2007.

=== Illness and death ===
Nomi's body started to deteriorate rapidly in 1982. By the spring of 1983 his immune system was destroyed and he was diagnosed with AIDS. Nomi was admitted to the infectious disease ward of Memorial Sloan Kettering Cancer Center in New York City. Most of Nomi's friends were afraid to visit him because no one knew how the virus spread at that point, although photographer Michael Halsband as well as Man Parrish did visit him. They were forced to wear masks and gloves, and told not to touch him. Halsband also did a small photoshoot with Nomi during their visit, although Nomi didn't even have enough strength to strike his signature pose. Nomi died on August 6, 1983, as a result of complications from AIDS. He was one of the earliest known figures from the arts community to die from the illness. Nomi's close friend Joey Arias was executor of his estate. Nomi's ashes were scattered in New York City.

== Legacy ==
Filmmaker Andrew Horn and writer Jim Fouratt consider Nomi an important part of the 1980s East Village scene, which was a hotbed of development for punk rock music, the visual arts, and the avant-garde. Although Nomi's work had not yet met with national commercial success at the time of his death, he garnered a cult following, mainly in New York and in France. Andrew Horn's 2004 feature documentary about Nomi's life, The Nomi Song, which was released by Palm Pictures, helped spur renewed interest in the singer, including an art exhibit in San Francisco at the New Langton Arts gallery and one in Milan at the Res Pira Lab, which subsequently moved to Berlin's Strychnin Gallery, called "Do You Nomi?" New music pieces inspired by Nomi were commissioned by the gallery for a variety of European musicians, including Ernesto Tomasini.

=== In popular culture ===
In 2001, German pop duo Rosenstolz and English singer Marc Almond recorded a cover version of "Total Eclipse".

Nomi makes an appearance in Derf Backderf's graphic novel Punk Rock and Trailer Parks, released in 2008.

Rush Limbaugh would showcase Nomi's "You Don't Own Me" by playing it in the background during the Gay Community Update portion of his show.

Timur and the Dime Museum covered Nomi on their America's Got Talent audition. In 2023, Timur Bekbosunov and Matthew Setzer premiered a musical "Klaus from Space" curated by composer of Nomi's hits, Kristian Hoffman at O. Festival in Rotterdam, described by Theaterkrant critic as "This reincarnation of Klaus Nomi shows serious feelings beneath the glitz and kitsch."

Nomi makes an appearance in the Adult Swim cartoon The Venture Bros. in the 2006 season 2 closing episode "Showdown at Cremation Creek."

The Staatsoper Unter den Linden in Berlin staged a mixture of drama, opera and performance about Klaus Nomi's life and death under the title “Don't You Nomi?” in the 2023/2024 season. Various songs by Klaus Nomi were interpreted by the German countertenor Nils Wanderer.

In 2026, Smosh released an episode of their flagship series, Bit City, that featured a character named 'Thera-Menn', who was an homage to Nomi. Portrayed by Tommy Bowe, Thera-Menn sports both a near-identical look to Nomi and a similarly high-pitched singing voice.

== Discography ==
=== Albums ===
Album	Year	Album information
Klaus Nomi	1981	Label: RCA; Format: LP, Cassette, CD, Digital Download
Simple Man	1982	Label: RCA; Format: LP, Cassette, CD, Digital Download

==== Compilations ====
Album	Year	Album information
Encore	1983	Label: RCA; Format: LP, Cassette, CD, Digital Download
The Collection	1991	Released in Europe and Japan; Label: RCA; Format: Cassette, CD
Klaus Nomi	1994	Released in France and Germany; Label: RCA; Format: Cassette, CD
Eclipsed: The Best of Klaus Nomi	1999	Released in the United States; Label: Razor & Tie; Format: CD
Nomi	2023	Box set containing LP reissues of Klaus Nomi, Simple Man, Encore and In Concert; Released: 16 June 2023; Label: Sony Music; Format: 4LP
Remixes	2023	Released: September 29, 2023; Label: Legacy; Format: LP, CD, Digital Download
Remixes: Volume 2	2023	Released: December 15, 2023; Label: Legacy; Format: LP, CD, Digital Download

==== Live ====
Album	Year	Album information
In Concert	1986	Recorded in 1979; Includes cover of "I Feel Love"; Label: RCA; Format: LP, Cassette, CD, Digital Download

=== Singles ===
Single	Year	Single information	Album
"You Don't Own Me" b/w "Falling in Love Again"	1981	Label: RCA; Cat. No.: PB-8783; Released in France and Spain	Klaus Nomi
"Total Eclipse" b/w "Falling in Love Again"	1981	Label: RCA; Cat. No.: PB-8885; Released in Germany	Klaus Nomi
"Nomi Song" / "The Cold Song" (Double A-side)	1982	Label: RCA; Cat. No.: PB-8864; Released in France	Klaus Nomi
"Lightning Strikes" b/w "Falling in Love Again"	1982	Label: RCA; Cat. No.: RCA 173; Released in the United Kingdom	Klaus Nomi
"Simple Man" b/w "Death"	1982	Label: RCA; Cat. No.: PB-9947; Released in France and Spain	Simple Man
"Ding Dong" b/w "Death" (Germany/UK) b/w "ICUROK" (France)	1982	Label: RCA; Cat. No.: PB 61005 (Germany); Released in Germany, United Kingdom and France	Simple Man
"Just One Look" b/w "Rubberband Lazer"	1983	Label: RCA; Cat. No.: PB-50733; Released in Canada	Simple Man
"ICUROK" / "Simple Man" (12" single)	1983	Label: RCA; Cat. No.: KD-10005; Released in Canada	Simple Man
"The Cold Song" b/w "Wasting My Time" (France) b/w "Keys of Life" (Japan)	1983	Used in the film A Nos Amours; Label: RCA; Cat. No.: PB 61268; Released in France and Japan	Klaus Nomi
"Ding Dong" b/w "Samson and Delilah" (12" single)	1985	Includes extended version of "Ding Dong"; Label: RCA; Cat. No.: PC 61535; Released in France	Encore!
"I Feel Love" b/w "I Feel Love" (Live)	1986	Rare studio version of "I Feel Love"; Label: RCA; Cat. No.: PB 40943	In Concert
"Za Bak Daz" / "Silent Night" (CD single)	1998	Archival recordings from c. 1980; Label: Heliocentric	Za Bakdaz: The Unfinished Opera
"Total Eclipse" (Remake)	2011	Released April 1, 2011; Remix by Man Parrish; Digital single	–
"Cold Song 2013"	2013	Released July 15, 2013; Remixes by DJ Hell; Formats: 12", Digital Download; Released in Germany	Remixes: Volume 2
"Simple Man" (Agar Agar Remix)	2023	Digital single	Remixes
"The Cold Song" (Arnaud Rebotini Remix)	2023	Digital single	Remixes
"Nomi Song" (Vince Clarke Remix)	2023	Digital single	Remixes

=== Promotional releases ===
Title	Year	Information	Tracklist
You Don't Own Me	1981	12" Promo for the album Klaus Nomi; Label: RCA; Cat. No.: DC 8812; Released in France	1. "You Don't Own Me"; 2. "The Cold Song"; 3. "Lightning Strikes"
Wayward Sisters	1982	12" Promo for the album Simple Man; Label: RCA; Cat. No.: DC 9948; Released in France	1. "Wayward Sisters"; 2. "Ding Dong"; 3. "Simple Man"; 4. "Death"
The Nomi Song: Remixes	2005	CD Promo released in conjunction with The Nomi Song documentary; Label: Palm Pictures; Cat. No.: PRCD31102; Released in the United States	1. "Total Eclipse" (The Atomic Party Mix); 2. "Mon Coeur" (L.H.O.O.Q. Mix); 3. "Total Eclipse" (The Man Parrish Mix); 4. "Coeur Total" (Dremstat's 22 Year Remix); 5. "Mon Coeur" (Moog Cookbook Mix)

=== Music videos ===
- 1981: "Falling in Love Again"
- 1982: "Nomi Song"
- 1982: "Lightning Strikes"
- 1982: "Simple Man" (directed and edited by John Zieman)
- 1983: "The Cold Song" (Available In A Censored And Uncensored Version)

All music videos except "The Cold Song" were released in Japan on a VHS titled Tribute To Klaus Nomi.

=== Film appearances ===
- Long Island Four (1979)
- Mr. Mike's Mondo Video (1979)
- Urgh! A Music War (1982)
- The Nomi Song (2004)

== See also ==
- LGBT culture in New York City
- List of LGBT people from New York City
