= Jon Cobert =

Jon Cobert was born in Brooklyn, NY, studied piano and theory with Ted Harris and received a degree in music theory and composition from NYU. Cobert plays the piano, organ, accordion, synthesizer, guitar, bass and drums. He is best known for his work with Klaus Nomi, John Lennon and Tom Chapin. He has five Grammy Award nominations for his work with Chapin.

Best known for his work on the keyboard, Cobert has recorded, toured and/or performed with John Lennon, Bruce Springsteen, Jackson Browne, Laura Branigan, Dion, Tom Chapin, Harry Chapin, Regis Philbin, Loudon Wainwright III, Dionne Warwick, B.J. Thomas, Steve Tyrell, Terry Cashman, Henry Gross, John Denver, Judy Collins, Vanessa Williams, The Chapin Sisters, Jen Chapin, Chubby Checker, Lyfe Jennings, Darryl McDaniels (DMC), Linda Eder, Jim Steinman, Leslie Uggams, Klaus Nomi, Al Green, Liel, John Forster, Mary Kate and Ashley Olsen, Red Grammer, Rosenshontz, Gary Rosen, Bill Shontz, Kirsten Thien, Michael Mark, John McCutcheon, Kings Highway, Dave Pettigrew, Adrian Loveridge, Keith Herman, Tommy Walker and Black Ivory. He is also credited for being in the 1988 documentary Imagine: John Lennon.

Cobert has also written many jingles and sports themes, the best known being the theme to ESPN Baseball Tonight.

Cobert's current group is known as Cobert Operations. He currently resides in Westchester County, NY with his family. He has released 2 CDs of his original songs; Here's Your Canoe and He Had a Hat.
