= An American Family =

American television series (1973)

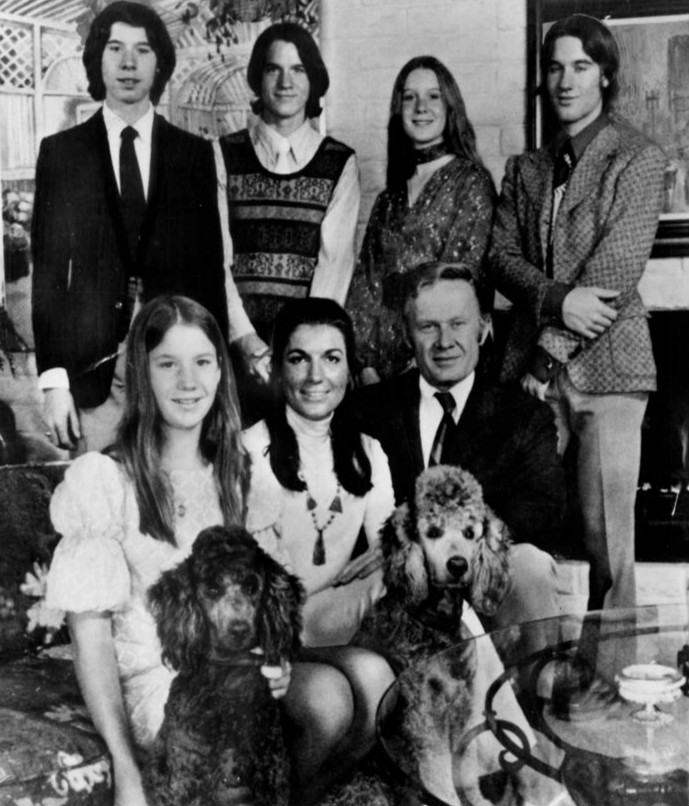
- The Loud Family (Back, from left: Kevin, Grant, Delilah and Lance. Front, from left: Michele, Pat and Bill)
- Genre: Documentary/Reality
- Country of origin: United States
- Original language: English
- No. of seasons: 1
- No. of episodes: 12

Production
- Producer: Craig Gilbert
- Editors: Pat Cook; Eleanor Hamerow; David Hanser; Ken Werner
- Production company: WNET New York

Original release
- Network: PBS
- Release: January 11 – March 29, 1973

An American Family is an American television documentary series that followed the life of a California family in the early 1970s. Widely referred to as the first example of an American reality TV show, the series drew millions of weekly viewers, who were drawn to a story that seemed to shatter the rosy façade of upper-middle-class suburbia. It also became a lightning rod for discussion about the precarious state of the American family in the early 1970s. An American Family ranks #32 on TV Guide's 50 Greatest TV Shows of All Time list.

== Production and story ==
Created by Craig Gilbert, An American Family examined the daily trials and tribulations of the Loud family of Santa Barbara, California. Researching subjects for the series, Gilbert interviewed about 24 families before he settled on the Louds—a mother, father, and five "telegenic" children who owned a large house, multiple cars, and a swimming pool.

Shooting began in May 1971, and Gilbert and his film crew, which included the cinematographer Alan Raymond, along with his wife Susan Raymond, who handled sound, spent the next seven months filming the Louds.

The final product, edited down from 300 hours of 16-millimeter footage, was An American Family, which aired in 1973 as 12 weekly one-hour episodes on the Public Broadcasting Service (PBS). The film was presented in a fly-on-the-wall, direct cinema style with very limited narration.

The story that unfolded of the Louds, who at the outset of the series seemed to epitomize the American dream, showed a married couple on the verge of divorce and children, ranging from 14 to 20 years old, in high and low moments. The "toothpaste-bright affluence, California-style" family, as described in 1973 in The New York Times, turned out to be "comfortably ordinary, sadly familiar, the kind of family most white middle-class Americans can identify with."

The series was popular, earning more than 10 million viewers a week. It also sparked controversy and drove conversation in national magazines and television talk shows about the state of the American family.

In 2011, Dennis Lim wrote in The New York Times that the intense interest in the Louds: "...had much to do with their lives seeming to fall apart as America watched."

== The Loud family ==
The popularity of the series, which was viewed by 10 million Americans per week, gave the Louds a form of celebrity. Family members profiled were:

- Bill Loud (1921–2018)
- Pat Loud (1926–2021)
- Lance Loud (1951–2001)
- Kevin Robert Loud (born 1953)
- Grant Loud (born 1954)
- Delilah Ann Loud (born 1955)
- Michele Loud (born 1957)

Lance Loud is credited as the first continuing character on television who was openly gay, and he subsequently became an icon within the LGBT community. He later became a columnist for the national LGBT news magazine The Advocate. Lance, who had been a pen pal of Andy Warhol, himself known for his commentary on celebrity, said the series fulfilled “the middle-class dream that you can become famous for being just who you are.”

One of the more notable moments of the series was when, after 21 years of marriage, Pat asked Bill for a divorce and to leave the house. Pat's saying to her husband, "You know there's a problem" – with Bill's response, "What's your problem?" – was chosen as one of the Top 100 Television Moments by TV Guide.

The series drew intense interest, millions of viewers, and considerable controversy. The family was featured in Newsweek on March 12, 1973, in the article "The Broken Family".

In 2003, PBS broadcast the show Lance Loud!: A Death in an American Family, which was filmed in 2001. Visiting the same family again at the invitation of Lance before his death, the family members participated in the documentary, with the exception of Grant. Lance was 50 years old, had gone through 20 years of addiction to crystal meth, and was HIV positive. He died of liver failure caused by a hepatitis C and HIV co-infection that year. The show was billed by PBS as the final episode of An American Family.

Subsequent to the showing of A Death in an American Family, Pat and Bill Loud moved back in together, granting one of Lance's last wishes. They lived very close to three of their four surviving children — Grant, Michele, and Delilah — and kept in close contact with Kevin and his family, who lived in Arizona. In 2012, Pat Loud released a book about her son's life called Lance Out Loud. Bill died in July 2018. Pat Loud died in her sleep from natural causes on January 10, 2021, at age 94.

== Critical response ==
According to the New York Times in 2011, "critical and popular reaction varied," and it suggested the series reflected America in a "counterculture hangover."

Some critics praised the raw honesty of the series. The anthropologist Margaret Mead called it "an extraordinary series" and said that "nothing like it has ever been done." Mead also proclaimed that An American Family was "as new and significant as the invention of drama or the novel.” Others were put off, viewing the Louds as a sign of the nuclear family's demise.

Jean Baudrillard, a French philosopher and sociologist, described An American Family as a symptom of the way TV has changed our relationship with reality itself.

The Louds' response to the series was positive at first, it seemed. Shortly after filming wrapped, Pat Loud wrote in a letter to Gilbert: “I think you’ve handled the film with as much kindness as is possible and still remained honest. I am, in short, simply astounded, enormously pleased and very proud.” But the Louds' feelings soon soured. They began to vocalize criticism of Gilbert's emphasis on the negative parts of their lives. In an appearance on The Dick Cavett Show in 1973, Pat Loud said the series “makes us look like a bunch of freaks and monsters."

In 1988, Gilbert reflected on the legacy, stating, “I stand behind every frame of that series, yet I understand why it made so many people uncomfortable. This was a film about all of us. About how we’re all trying, and usually failing, to make sense out of life."

A 1973 review by John J. O'Conner in the New York Times, called it "quite extraordinary" and "unusually sensitive," and maintained: "It might be challenged and attacked. It cannot be dismissed."

== Cultural impact ==
An American Family is widely credited with ushering in the era of reality television.

In 2013, Gilbert criticized the modern-day genre of reality television: "What they’re doing is they’re using real people, but they’re scripting the shows." He called reality TV "basically cheap television."

The series inspired numerous TV shows, films, and documentaries.

In 1974, the BBC made its own similar program, called The Family. The program consisted of 12 half-hour episodes, showing the daily lives and concerns of the working-class Wilkins family, of Reading, Berkshire, England.

In 1978, in a skit called "The Loud Family", Saturday Night Live portrayed a family whose members shouted at the top of their lungs, even during intimate moments.

The series inspired a 1977 story arc in the satirical soap opera Mary Hartman, Mary Hartman in which a television crew for The David Susskind Show documents the daily life of the titular character as the "typical American consumer housewife".

In 1979, Albert Brooks spoofed the series in his film Real Life.

In 1983, HBO broadcast An American Family Revisited: The Louds 10 Years Later.

The Kate & Allie episode "The Very Loud Family", where Emma films their daily lives for a school project, is inspired by An American Family.

The 1985–88 mockumentary series of TV films The History of White People in America and Portrait of a White Marriage parody the series in following the lives of a dysfunctional white suburban family led by Fred Willard and Mary Kay Place.

The series inspired the MTV reality television series The Real World.

Jonathan Dayton, co-director of the film Little Miss Sunshine (2006), says the film was inspired in part by An American Family.

In April 2011, PBS rebroadcast the entire original series in a marathon format on many of its member stations, before the release of the HBO film Cinema Verite, which was based on the series.

On July 7, 2011, most PBS stations presented An American Family: Anniversary Edition, a two-hour film by Alan and Susan Raymond that featured selected moments from the documentary series, in tribute to the 40 years since the series began filming in 1971. It was subsequently released on DVD.

The French philosopher Jean Baudrillard mentions the television series in his book Simulacra and Simulation (1981).

== Dispute over Cinema Verite ==
The 2011 HBO film Cinema Verite, a fictional examination of the making An American Family, brought to the surface a dispute over the process of making An American Family.

The film portrays a clash between the series' creator, Gilbert (played by James Gandolfini), and the cinematographer Alan Raymond (played by Patrick Fugit). The clash depicted in the film was over the validity of the original series' cinema verite descriptor. The film suggests Gilbert "may have instigated drama and may have overstepped boundaries" during the filming of An American Family, including a rumored relationship between him and Pat Loud (which both parties deny).

Alan Raymond and his wife, Susan, who handled sound on An American Family, served as consultants on the HBO project, but they said they agreed with the "thrust" of Gilbert's series. The Raymonds did have their criticisms. Alan said he and Susan were "at odds with Craig over the treatment of the family. There were numerous confrontations where we tried to raise the question about whether the experiment was veering off course.”

Director Robert Pulcini said, "Everybody remembers it a little bit differently or a lot differently depending on what you’re talking about."

Gilbert saw it differently, defending his approach this way: "I didn’t script a thing. I didn’t do anything. I didn’t negotiate anything. I didn’t manipulate anything." He dismissed the HBO film as "a fiction" and offered that "an impossible script" challenged the film.

The film's screenwriter David Seltzer defended his script, saying, "The critical mass of research was my barometer for what to go with". Seltzer also consulted Pat Loud's book when writing the script.

Gilbert and the Raymonds shared the opinion that An American Family is unfairly blamed as the progenitor of today's reality television.

== Craig Gilbert ==
Gilbert was born in New York City; his father was a copyright lawyer who worked with songwriters including Irving Berlin. He started his film and TV career at WNET-TV, in New York. He produced documentaries about anthropologist Margaret Mead and Christy Brown, a disabled Irish artist. Daniel Day-Lewis, in preparation for his Oscar-winning role as Brown for the 1989 movie My Left Foot, consulted Gilbert. Gilbert and his wife, Suzanne Stater, separated in the early 1970s shortly before filming began (incidentally, Bill and Pat announce their separation on camera in an episode of the series). "The idea for the series was something out of my own life," Gilbert said to The Washington Post in 1973.

== Credits ==
An American Family episode nine end-credits; rerun airdate April 24, 2011, 7 a.m., WNET-TV

- Conceived and produced by Craig Gilbert
- Executive producer: Curtis W. Davis
- Camera: Alan Raymond
- Sound: Susan Raymond
- Coordinating producer: Jacqueline Donnet
- Associate producer: Susan Lester
- Film editor: Ken Werner
- Assistant film editor: Bob Alvarez
- Additional photography: Joan Churchill
- Additional sound: Peter Pilafian
- Assistant cameramen: Tom Goodwin, Peter Smokler, Mike Levine
- Series title film created by Elinor Bunin
- Title-music supervision: John Adams
- Film editors unit: Pat Cook, David Hanser, Eleanor Hamerow, Ken Werner
- Editing assistants: Joanna Alexander, Ernie Davidson, Bob Alvarez, Janet Lauretano, Tikki Goldberg, Dan Merrill, Joe Lovett, Sue Steinberg
- Apprentices: Jesse Maple, Hannah Wajshonig, Harvey Rosenstock
- Sound editor: Thomas Halpin
- Assistant sound editor: Peet Begley
- Production managers: Kathleen Walsh, Michael Podell
- Assistant: Janet Freeman
- Location unit managers: David Burke, Bernard Katz, Peter Scarlet
- Production secretary: Alice Carey
- Production assistants: Kristin Glover, David Henry
- Research: Will MacDonald
- Sound mixer: Richard Vorisek
- Engineering supervisor: Ed Reingold
- Senior video engineer Art Emerson
- Funding provided by the Ford Foundation and the Corporation for Public Broadcasting
- A production of WNET/13
- Copyright 1973 Educational Broadcasting Corporation

== See also ==
- Up (film series)
