= Za Bakdaz =

Studio album by Klaus Nomi
- Released: December 2007
- Studios: 1979–1983; 1984–2006 at home studio of Page Wood and George Elliott
- Genres: New wave; ambient; sound collage; dark cabaret
- Label: Heliocentric
- Producers: Klaus Nomi; George Elliott; Page Wood

Klaus Nomi chronology
In Concert (1986)	Za Bakdaz (2007)

Professional ratings
Review scores
Source	Rating
AllMusic	4/5 stars
PopMatters	8/10 stars

Za Bakdaz: The Unfinished Opera is a collection of songs German countertenor Klaus Nomi was working on up until his death in 1983. The album was released posthumously in 2007. The large majority of the tracks have never before been heard on an official studio release; the original sessions took place from 1979 to 1983, with the tracks completed between 1984 and 2006 at the home studio of Page Wood and George Elliott.

In 2026, Uncut ranked Za Bakdaz at number 171 in their list of "The 200 Greatest Goth Albums", believing the songs make "a quirky yet mesmerising dark cabaret addition to the early gothic canon."

== Track listing ==
1. "High Wire" – 2:04
2. "Valentine's Day" – 2:49
3. "Enchanté" – 4:31
4. "Overture" – 2:42
5. "Cre Spoda" – 3:03
6. "Metronomi" – 2:44
7. "Intermezzzo" – 1:16
8. "Za Bakdaz" (live) – 3:09
9. "Perna-A-Gyre" – 2:56
10. "Finale" – 2:33
11. "Rubber Band Lazer" (demo) – 2:21
12. "Silent Night" – 1:38
