= Lance Loud =

American columnist, musician (1951–2001)

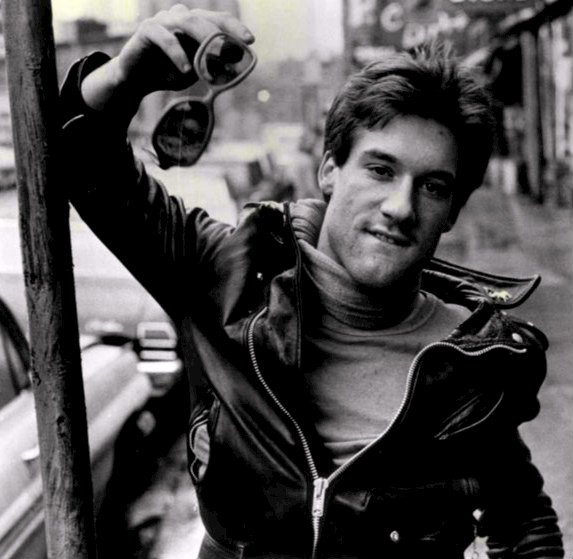
- Loud in 1973
- Born: Alanson Russell Loud; June 26, 1951; La Jolla, San Diego, California, U.S.
- Died: December 22, 2001 (aged 50); Los Angeles, California, U.S.
- Occupations: Musician, magazine columnist

Alanson Russell "Lance" Loud (June 26, 1951 – December 22, 2001) was an American television personality, magazine columnist, and new wave rock-n-roll performer. Loud is best known for his 1973 appearance in An American Family, a pioneering reality television series that featured his coming out, leading to his status as an icon in the gay community.

== Early life ==
Alanson Russell "Lance" Loud was born in 1951 in La Jolla, California to William and Patricia (nee Russell) Loud; Lance was the eldest of their five children. At the time of his birth, Loud's father was in the United States Navy. Following his father's separation from the Navy, Loud and his family spent several years living in his mother's hometown of Eugene, Oregon. During Loud's adolescence, he and his family moved from Oregon to Santa Barbara, California. It was here that Loud's teen years were shaped after discovering the artistic and cultural influences of Andy Warhol, The Factory, and The Velvet Underground. Eventually, Loud became a pen pal and friend of Warhol's.

In late 1969, Loud and his best-friend, Kristian Hoffman, drove to San Francisco to experience Haight-Ashbury and the neighborhood's much-publicized cultural scene as well as explore the city's gay enclaves. After leaving the Bay Area, the pair drove east to the San Joaquin Valley and Altamont Raceway Park near Tracy, California. There, they attended the now-infamous Altamont Free Concert.

== An American Family ==
Loud's fame came with An American Family, a documentary of his family's life, which was broadcast in the U.S. on PBS in 1973, drawing 10 million viewers and causing considerable controversy.

== The Mumps ==
Loud regrouped his band, naming it "The Mumps". Along with Kristian Hoffman, the band included Rob Duprey, Jay Dee Daugherty and Aaron Kiley. Daugherty and Kiley left the band early on and were replaced by Kevin Kiely and Paul Rutner.

Over the course of five years, The Mumps were booked regularly at Max's Kansas City and CBGB, and played on bills with rock and punk rock bands such as Television, Talking Heads, the Ramones, Blondie, Milk 'N' Cookies, The Cramps, Cheap Trick, and Van Halen. Despite two 'critically acclaimed' and 'independent 45s', the group never landed a contract with a major record label. Two compilations of their music have been released: Fatal Charm (Eggbert Records, 1994), and a illustrated, remastered, 2-disc CD/DVD compilation, How I Saved The World, in 2005. The CD booklets contain tributes from members of the Cramps, Sparks, R.E.M., the New York Dolls, Blondie, Dramarama, the Go-Go's, Danzig, Devo, Patti Smith Group, and the Screamers, as well as praise from Danny Fields, Jayne County, Rufus Wainwright, and Paul Reubens.

Loud wrote a monthly column in the influential Rock Scene magazine, an early supporter of glam and the punk genre. In his columns, Loud reported on his favorite artists and covered junkets he took, such as a brief tour with Jim Dandy Mangrum of the band Black Oak Arkansas.

== Later career and family ==
When Loud left music performance, he became a columnist for several national magazines, including The Advocate, Details, Interview, and Creem. As a journalist, Loud remained active in cultural scenes as well as giving occasional lectures on the impact of An American Family on American society at colleges around the country. He was present at the Andy Warhol Museum in Pittsburgh when his teenage letters to Andy were officially entered into the Andy Warhol archive.

The Loud family was kept in the public eye through two televised PBS updates, each filmed by the original An American Family team of Alan and Susan Raymond. The last documentary, called Lance Loud! A Death in An American Family, was about Loud's physical decline, including his 20-year addiction to crystal meth and his struggle to survive with HIV. The documentary was shown on PBS in January 2003.

Subsequent to the showing of A Death in An American Family, Loud's parents moved back in together, granting one of his last wishes. Loud's mother and father lived in the same vicinity of all of their children, with the exception of Kevin, who lived outside of California. Loud's father, Bill, died in 2018 and his mother, Pat, died in 2021.

== Death ==
In 2001, Loud entered the Carl Bean hospice in Los Angeles, California, suffering from hepatitis C and the effects of HIV. While in hospice care, he wrote his final article, "Musings on Mortality". On December 22, 2001, Lance Loud died at age 50 of liver failure due to the comorbidity of hepatitis C and HIV. Portions of Loud's memorial gathering in the garden of Hollywood's Chateau Marmont are included in the documentary, A Death in An American Family, including tributes from friends and family. A rendition of "Over the Rainbow" was sung by Rufus Wainwright while he was accompanied on piano by Wainwright's mother Kate McGarrigle.

== Legacy ==
In 2010, HBO Films announced that it was making Cinema Verite, a film about the making of An American Family, with Thomas Dekker cast as Lance Loud. The film had its debut showing on HBO on April 23, 2011.

In 2012, Loud's mother, Pat, authored a book about his life titled Lance Out Loud. The book was edited by Christopher Makos and published by Glitterati Incorporated.
