= Andrew Horn (filmmaker) =

American documentary filmmaker (1952–2019)

Andrew Horn (September 16, 1952 – August 24, 2019) was an American film producer, director and writer. He was the winner of the 2004 Teddy Award for The Nomi Song in the category Best Documentary Film. In 2014, he directed We Are Twisted Fucking Sister!, a documentary about American heavy metal band Twisted Sister.

== Career ==
A New Yorker by birth, Horn studied at NYU. He moved to Berlin, Germany in 1989 for a fellowship program. His Emmy-winning film research were included on projects by BBC, Channel 4, PBS, HBO and the Paul Robeson Foundation alongside films by Spike Lee and Michael Moore.

== Death ==
He was 66 when he died of cancer in Berlin on August 24, 2019.

== Filmography ==
- Doomed Love (1983)
- The Big Blue (1988)
- East Side Story (1997)
- The Nomi Song (2004)
- Jesse Owens (2013; research)
- We Are Twisted Fucking Sister! (2014)
