= Mumps (rock band) =

US musical group

- Origin: Southern California, United States
- Genres: Punk rock
- Labels: Bomp Records; Sympathy for the Record Industry; Omnivore Recordings
- Past members: Lance Loud; Kristian Hoffman; Rob Duprey; Jay Dee Daugherty; Aaron Kiley; Kevin Kiely; Paul Rutner; Joe Katz

Mumps (sometimes credited as The Mumps) were an American punk band fronted by Lance Loud. The mainstays of the band were Loud and keyboardist and primary songwriter Kristian Hoffman (who he had met at school), and guitarist Rob Duprey. The initial rhythm section was Jay Dee Daugherty and Aaron Kiley on drums and bass respectively. Kiley and Daugherty were replaced with Kevin Kiely and John Earl (JED) Dennis. Shortly thereafter, Dennis was replaced by Paul Rutner, which completed the "classic" Mumps lineup. Joe Katz, also of The Student Teachers, replaced Kiely late on in the original run of the band.

Mumps were a popular band at clubs such as Max's Kansas City and CBGB. They also performed at Irving Plaza and Maxwell's (Hoboken, New Jersey), and opened for the Ramones at Hurrah in August 1978. Their concerts were lively and featured energetic, expressive performances from Lance Loud and other band members on songs like "We're Americans", "I Believe In Anyone But You", "Strange Seed", "Brain Massage", "Scream and Scream Again".

Their first 45 record single was "I Like To Be Clean", backed by "Crocodile Tears" on Bomp Records. Their second was "Rock & Roll This & That" with two B-sides: "Muscleboys" and "That Fatal Charm". The recorded version of "Rock & Roll This & That" interpolated a short guitar riff from the Rolling Stones' "(I Can't Get No) Satisfaction", but in live performances, they would interpolate other riffs such as David Bowie's "Rebel Rebel". In spite of these two independently produced singles, they failed to secure a contract with a major record label, notably being told "'We don’t want ‘the gay band'" by A&M.

Three compilations of their music have been released, Fatal Charm (Eggbert Records, 1994), a remastered, 2-disc CD and DVD compilation, How I Saved The World (Sympathy for the Record Industry, 2005) and a single disc CD/LP collection Rock & Roll This, Rock & Roll That: Best Case Scenario, You’ve Got Mumps (Omnivore Recordings, 2021).

== Members ==
=== Timeline ===
* Collert, Cheeseman and the younger Louds were in the proto-Mumps band Loud
† Mache and Gomez filled in at 1990 partial reunion show. They were members of Hoffman's other band, The Swinging Madisons
