= Man Parrish =

American musician and producer (born 1958)

- Born: Manuel Parrish; May 6, 1958 (age 68); New York City, U.S.
- Genres: Electro; hi-NRG
- Occupations: Musician; record producer; songwriter
- Years active: 1982–present
- Labels: Polydor; PolyGram; Elektra; Parrish Digital
- Website: www.manparrish.com

Manuel Parrish (born May 6, 1958) is an American songwriter, vocalist and producer. He, along with artists such as Yellow Magic Orchestra, Kraftwerk, Art of Noise, Arthur Baker, Afrika Bambaataa, John Robie, Jellybean Benitez, Lotti Golden, Richard Scher and Aldo Marin, helped create and define electro in the early 1980s.

== Early life ==
Parrish was born and raised in Brooklyn, New York. He left home at the age of 14 and became a member of the crowd that converged nightly at the Studio 54 nightclub in Manhattan. The nickname "Man" was given to Parrish by Andy Warhol, and first appeared in Warhol's Interview magazine.

== Career ==
Parrish's early live shows at Bronx hip-hop clubs were spectacles of lights, glitter, and pyrotechnics, which drew as much from the Warhol mystique as the Cold Crush Brothers. His first release was "Hip Hop, Be Bop (Don't Stop)" issued in 1982, which Parrish said faced a racial backlash from the African-American hip hop community: "I was making the music that they played, and then they found out I was white and gay they pulled it. It didn't hurt sales but it was shocking." His biggest chart success in the UK was his recording of "Male Stripper" with Man 2 Man, which peaked at No. 4 in the UK Singles Chart.

After his initial success, he signed with Elektra Records and hired Tony DeFries as his manager, but was dropped from the label in 1984, when they decided not to release his completed album over creative differences. Parrish went on to mix and produce music for artists such as Boy George, Michael Jackson and Gloria Gaynor, and served as the road manager for the Village People.

In 2018, three pieces of his musical works were accepted into the Museum of Modern Art's MoMA permanent collection in New York City. Film scores for Behive, (a modern dance film), The Jones's, (an indie art film) and his 1983 music video for "Hip Hop, Be Bop (Don't Stop)".

== Personal life ==
Parrish is gay. He lives in Port St. Lucie, Florida.

== Discography ==
=== Albums ===
- Man Parrish (Importe/12 Records, 1982)
- Boogie Down (Rams Horn Records, 1985)
- The Best of Man Parrish (Rams Horn Records, 1991)
- Dreamtime (Hot Records, 1996)
- Star (Parrish Digital, 2017)

=== Singles ===
Year	Single	Peak chart positions					Certifications
Year	Single	UK	US Dance	US R&B	AUS	NZ	Certifications
1982	"Man Made"	–	–	–	–	–	
1982	"Hip Hop Be Bop (Don't Stop)"	41	4	66	–	–	
1983	"Heatstroke"	83	–	–	–	–	
1984	"Boogie Down (Bronx)"	56	–	76	–	–	
1985	"Hey There, Home Boys"	–	–	–	–	–	
1986	"Male Stripper" (with Man 2 Man)	4	–	–	3	8	BPI: Silver
1987	"Brown Sugar"	–	–	–	–	–	
1991	"From Here to Eternity" (with Paul Parker)	–	–	–	–	–	
"–" denotes releases that did not chart.
