= The Times Square Show =

1980 art exhibition in New York City

The Times Square Show was an influential collaborative, self-curated, and self-generated art exhibition held by New York artists' group Colab (aka Collaborative Projects, Inc) in Times Square in a shuttered massage parlor at 201 W. 41st and 7th Avenue during the entire month of June in 1980. The Times Square Show was largely inspired by the more radical Colab show The Real Estate Show (that occurred in January 1980), but unlike it, was open 24 hours a day, 7 days a week, in what was then a Times Square full of porno theaters, peep shows, and red light establishments. In addition to experimental painting and sculpture, the exhibition incorporated music, fashion, and an ambitious program of performance and video. For many artists the exhibition served as a forum for the exchange of ideas, a testing-ground for social-directed figurative work in progress, and a catalyst for exploring new political-artistic directions.

== Historic significance ==
The Times Square Show's historic significance was established in The Times Square Show Revisited exhibition held at The Hunter College Art Galleries that was curated by Shawna Cooper, post-war art historian and graduate of the Hunter College Master’s Program in Art History, in association with Karli Wurzelbacher, also a Hunter alumnae and a PhD candidate in twentieth-century American art at the University of Delaware, that ran from September 14th to December 8th in 2012.The Times Square Show Revisited exhibition was accompanied by a catalogue and comprehensive website, which includes extensive interviews with the participants in the original exhibition.

Elena Martinique writes in WideWalls magazine that The Times Square Show was the first art exhibition to overtly transcended the trappings of class and culture by bringing together people who would not necessarily come together under any other circumstances.

The Times Square Show was featured in 2023 at the Centre Pompidou in a Nicolas Ballet curated No Wave exhibition entitled Who You Staring At: Culture visuelle de la scène no wave des années 1970 et 1980 (Visual culture of the no wave scene in the 1970s and 1980s).

== Promoting The Times Square Show ==
The New York art world first heard of The Times Square Show in the summer of 1980 through Colab's advertising on television and on the giant Spectacolor digital board in Times Square, made possible by Colab member Jane Dickson. Colab made three thirty-second TV spots that ran on Channel 5. The eccentric performer Jack Smith was featured in one of these ads that was created by Scott B and Beth B. Glenn O'Brien and Bomb magazine editor Betsy Sussler also appear in a video ad created by Coleen Fitzgibbon and Cara Perlman. Colab members also widely distributed street posters, placards, and flyers made by Colab artists. Also, Richard Goldstein wrote about The Times Square Show for the June 16th edition of The Village Voice a long article entitled The First Radical Art Show of the '80s. This article and Colab's DIY self-promotion drew a wide variety of audiences curious see an art show in the sordid Times Square area.

== Activities at The Times Square Show ==
The Times Square Show was an open access art show open twenty-four hours a day for thirty days. Most of the artists who participated in The Times Square Show came from Colab, White Columns, Fashion Moda or The Harlem Workshop. There were films, videos, poetry, music, and art performances and the audience would sometimes get into fights over whether it was a good performance or a bad performance. Some Colab artists would stay overnight.

Tom Otterness's half-skeleton/half-man painted plaster sculpture Symbolic Anatomy (1980) was placed in the front window next to where Jean-Michel Basquiat wrote Free Sex over the doorway (later somebody else spray-painted over it). Justen Ladda created a monumental installation drawing in the basement, Coleen Fitzgibbon and Robin Winters showed their collaboration Gun, Money, Plate wallpaper, Cara Perlman showed her large portrait paintings on paper, Jenny Holzer showed hand painted enamel on metal signs, like Living: Many Dogs Run Wild in the City, Keith Haring and Kenny Scharf showed their collaboration video The Sparkle End and David Hammons showed a spray of broken Night Train fortified wine bottles.

John Ahearn and Rigoberto Torres did live plaster casting sculptures of people off the street and occasionally made castings on the sidewalk, Jack Smith performed in a haze of hemp smoke in his Exotic Landlordism of the World one-man performance, Diane Torr (with filmmaker Ruth Peyser) did an art performance with a rubber inflatable porno doll and sex toys, and Sophie VDT and Mary Lemley organized fashion shows.

Also, The Times Square Show had a Fluxus-inspired Gift Shop area, that would come to be called The A. More Store, that sold low-priced multiples made by the participating Colab artists. Included were Bobby G's Money Talks pins, Becky Howland's Love Canal Potatoes, Kiki Smith’s Bloody-Hand Ashtrays, Joseph Nechvatal's Nuclear War Table Placemats, Charlie Ahearn’s Three Card Monte Times Square Advertisement poster, Robin Winters’s Plaster Colab Portraits and Jenny Holzer’s Manifesto posters. The A. More Store also appeared shortly after on Broome Street with the tag-line You won’t pay more at the A. More Store. Following The Times Square Show, other iterations of The A. More Store were presented at Barbara Gladstone Gallery, Jack Tilton Gallery, White Columns, and Printed Matter, Inc.

The Times Square Show also had a collectors’ night that invited the art world cognoscenti like Brooke Alexander Gallery, Mary Boone and Jeffrey Deitch. The art writers Richard Goldstein, Kim Levin and Lucy Lippard were among those who visited.

Bobby G, Mathew Geller, Mitch Corber and Julie Harrison made videotapes inside and outside the show, often interviewing spectators and Andrea Callard, Tom Warren, Francine Keery, Teri Slotkin and Lisa Kahane photographed the show and performance events. The No wave rock band The Raybeats performed live there.

== Participating artists ==
Participating artists included:

- Charlie Ahearn
- John Ahearn
- Peter Angermann
- Jean-Michel Basquiat
- Scott B and Beth B
- Andrea Callard
- Mitch Corber
- Jody Culkin
- Eva DeCarlo
- Jane Dickson
- Debby Davis
- Stefan Eins
- Peter Fend
- Carson Ferri-Grant
- Coleen Fitzgibbon
- Fab Five Freddy
- Bobby G (aka Robert Goldman)
- Matthew Geller
- Mike Glier
- Ilona Granet
- Rick Greenwald
- Mimi Gross
- David Hammons
- Duncan Hannah
- Keith Haring
- Julie Harrison
- Candace Hill-Montgomery
- Jenny Holzer
- Becky Howland
- Alex Katz
- Christof Kohlhofer
- Justen Ladda
- Mary Lemley
- Joe Lewis
- Aline Mare
- Alan W. Moore
- Joseph Nechvatal
- Group Normal
- Tom Otterness
- Cara Perlman
- Virge Piersol
- Uli Rimkus
- Judy Rifka
- Walter Robinson
- Christy Rupp
- Kenny Scharf
- Jane Sherry
- Teri Slotkin
- Jack Smith
- Kiki Smith
- Seton Smith
- Jolie Stahl
- Diane Torr
- Rigoberto Torres
- Sophie Vieille (aka Sophie VDT)
- Robin Winters

== See also ==
- Colab
- ABC No Rio
- Just Another Asshole
- No wave cinema
- Post-punk

== Sources ==
- Julie Ault, Alternative Art, New York, 1965-1985, University of Minnesota Press, 2002.
- David Little, Colab Takes a Piece, History Takes It Back: Collectivity and New York Alternative Spaces, Art Journal Vol.66, No. 1, Spring 2007, College Art Association, New York, pp. 60–74 (Article )
- Carlo McCormick, The Downtown Book: The New York Art Scene, 1974–1984, Princeton University Press, 2006.
- Alan W. Moore, Artists' Collectives: Focus on New York, 1975-2000 in Collectivism After Modernism: The Art of Social Imagination after 1945, Blake Stimson & Gregory Sholette, (eds) University of Minnesota Press, Minneapolis, 2007, pp. 193–221.
- Alan W. Moore and Marc Miller (eds), ABC No Rio Dinero: The Story of a Lower East Side Art Gallery, Collaborative Projects, NY, 1985.
- Max Schumann (ed.), A Book about Colab (and Related Activities) Printed Matter, Inc, 2016. pp. 100–119
- Francesco Spampinato, The Real Estate Show and The Times Square Show Revisited Colab Again - Stedelijk Studies
