= X Motion Picture Magazine =

Magazine

X Motion Picture Magazine (aka X Magazine) was an American No Wave newsprint arts magazine created in 1977 by the artist group Collaborative Projects (aka Colab), a certified non-profit organization in New York City.

X Magazine cover for Vol. 2, No. 2 & 3 (double issue)

Subjects included underground films, satellite networks, punk cut-up technique, S&M torture chambers, the films of Pier Paolo Pasolini and underground filmmaker Jack Smith. The magazine was published in three issues.

X Motion Picture Magazine was associated through Colab with the No wave cinema of New Cinema, a short-lived film screening room on St. Mark's Place in New York's East Village. The magazine's style is a seminal example of the raw cut-and-paste aesthetic of New York Punk visual art, Punk literature and No Wave anti-establishment sentiment that was flourishing downtown in the late-seventies.

== Vol. 1, No. 1 ==
The size of the 30 page Vol. 1 No. 1 (December 1977) was 11.5 x 7.5 inches and was assembled by Michael McClard, Eric Mitchell and Betsy Sussler. It had on the cover images from Jean-Luc Godard's 1976 film Ici et Ailleurs (Here and Elsewhere). Contributors included Diego Cortez, Terrence Severine (Sellers), Eric Mitchell, Kathy Acker, Michael McClard, Duncan Smith, Betsy Sussler, Jacki Ochs, Mitch Corber, Alan W. Moore, James Nares and Jimmy De Sana.

== Vol. 2, No. 2 & 3 (double issue) ==
Vo2. 1 No. 2 & 3 of X Magazine was published in February 1978 in 60 pages at the size of 11 ½ x 14 inches. It was assembled by Jimmy De Sana, Colen Fitzgibbon, Lindzee Smith, and Betsy Sussler. Contributors included Beth B, Charlie Ahearn, Keith Sonnier, Liza Bear, Rosa von Praunheim, Eric Mitchell, Lindzee Smith, Robert Cooney, Tim Burns, Andy Warhol, Jeremy Lipp, Kathy Acker, Leandro Katz, Jacki Ochs, and Duncan Smith.

For this issue Coleen Fitzgibbon and Alan W. Moore created a film in 1978 of a no wave music concert held to benefit Colab's X Magazine called X Magazine Benefit that documented a performance of Boris Policeband, DNA and James Chance and the Contortions. Shot in black and white super-8 the film captures the gritty look and sound of the music scene during that era. In 2013 it was exhibited at Salon 94, an art gallery in New York City.

== See also ==
- Underground film
- The Real Estate Show
- The Times Square Show
- No Wave Cinema
- Experimental film
- ABC No Rio
- Mudd Club
- super-8
