= Christy Rupp =

American artist and activist

Christy Rupp (born 1949) is an American artist and activist.

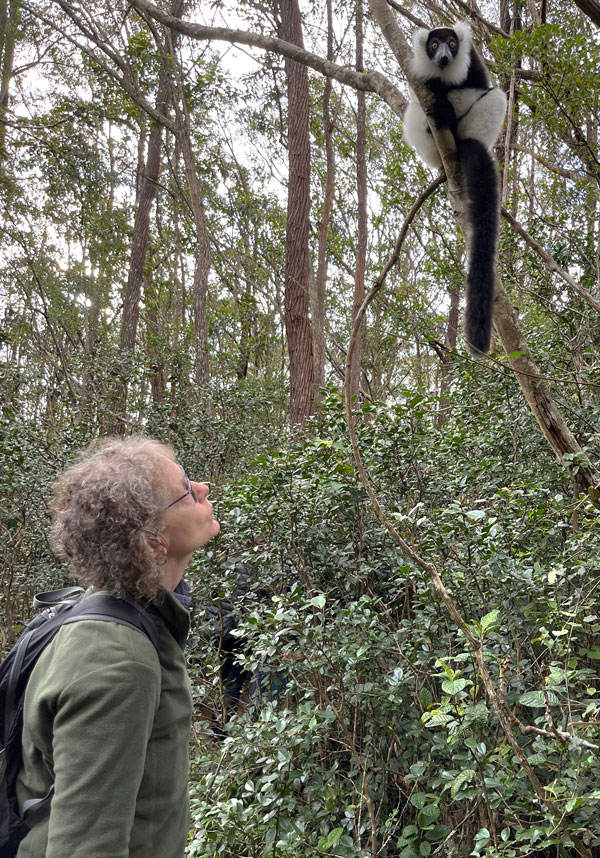
Christy with a friend.

== Early career ==
Rupp attended Colgate University (BA, 1974), Rhode Island School of Design - RISD (MAT 1974), and the Maryland Institute College of Art, Rinehart School of Sculpture (MFA 1977). As a resident of lower Manhattan in the late 1970s, Rupp exhibited in early artist-run spaces including Exit Art, 3 Mercer Street Store (a precursor to Fashion Moda, Franklin Furnace, the Kitchen, Artists Space, The Clocktower and PS1 International Studio Program, and ABC No Rio. During that time, she also worked as an artist under the Cultural Council Foundation Artist Project in New York City.

As a member of Collaborative Projects, she also participated in the illegal occupation of an abandoned city-owned building for the groundbreaking The Real Estate Show and also The Times Square Show. She also participated in the explosion of late-1970s artist generated activity which included Group Material, Artists Call Against US Intervention in Central America, (a nationwide mobilization of writers, artists, activists, artists organizations, and solidarity groups that began in New York in 1983), P.A.D.D.( Political Artists Documentation and Distribution), Artmakers, Ventana ( a collective of artists in Support of the Artists threatened by US aggression in the Contra wars of the 1980s in Central America). Her work appeared in early publications of The Soho News, East Village Eye, Heresies: A Feminist Publication on Art and Politics, World War 3 Illustrated

The first publicly visible work was "The Rat Patrol," which was an outdoor poster project of a life-size rat pasted where garbage accumulated, pointing out the fact the city is a living ecosystem with a delicate balance. Art critic Douglas Crimp reflected on this work by writing, "Surely a photograph of a rat borrowed from Health Department files and mechanically reproduced is not a creation of artistic imagination; it has no claim to universality; it would be unthinkable to see the picture on exhibition in a museum."

== Mid-career and recent work ==
In the mid-1980s, Rupp turned her attention to global ecological struggles, such as agribusiness and water contamination. One example being the Watershed Glassware, a set of glasses for drinking tap water, featuring printed images of "perfectly harmless" organisms like Giardia, Cryptosporidium, and Fluoride. She began to make public art works including Social Progress, a commission for the Public Art Fund. Recent works include sculptures of fake ivory and its association with commercial arms trade and oil extraction. In a statement, the artist explains that her work is less about animals than it is concerned with our attitudes towards habitat. Other recent works include the series "Extinct Birds Previously Consumed by Humans (From the Brink of Extinction to the Supermarket)," that was shown at the Museum of Art and Design's exhibition, Dead or Alive.

== Catalogue and book citations ==
- "Illegal America," Pub Exit Art, NYC, 1982
- "Content: A Contemporary Focus 1974-1984," Hirshhorn Museum and Sculpture Garden, 1984
- "A Decade of New Art," Artists Space publisher, 1984
- "Get the Message? A Decade of Art for Social Change," Lucy Lippard, E.P. Dutton, 1984. ISBN 0525480374 Publisher: E. P. Dutton, 1984
- "ABC No Rio Dinero: The Story of a Lower East Side Art Gallery," Alan Moore and Marc Miller, ABC No Rio with Collaborative Projects, 1985
- "Committed to print: social and political themes in recent American printed art," Deborah Wye, The Museum of Modern Art, 1988
- "Democracy: A project of Group Material," Dia Art Foundation: Discussions in Contemporary Art Number 5, Bay Press/Dia Art Foundation, 1990.“Artworks: Christy Rupp,” Williams College Museum of Art, 1991
- "The Artist Project Portraits of the Real Art World C: New York Artists 1981-1990," Peter Bellamy, IN Publishing, 1991
- “Natural Selection- The work of Christy Rupp,” Burchfield Penney Art Center, Buffalo, NY, essay Lucy Lippard, 1992
- "Signs Of Life: Kiki Smith, Rebecca Howland, Cara Perlman & Christy Rupp," University Galleries of Illinois State University, March 2, 1993
- "The Pink Glass Swan: Selected Feminist Essays on Art," The New Press, 1995
- “Christy Rupp, The Landscape Within," Castellani Art Museum, Niagara University, Niagara Falls, NY, 1999
- "Urban Mythologies: The Bronx Represented Since 1960's," Lydia Yee, The Bronx Museum, August 1999
- “Christy Rupp: Swimming in the Gene Pool,” MASS MoCA Kidspace, North Adams, MA, 2000
- "Welded Sculpture of the Twentieth Century," Judy Collischan, Hudson Hills; 1st edition, May 2, 2000
- "Paradise Now: Picturing the Genetic Revolution," Marvin Heiferman and Carole Kismaric, Tang, 2001
- "Alternative Art, New York, 1965-1985: A Cultural Politics Book for the Social Text Collective," Julie Aul, University of Minnesota Press, 2002
- “Nature In Pieces: The Environmental Sculpture of Christy Rupp,” Ulrich Museum of Art, Wichita State University, 2002
- "The Molecular Gaze: Art in the Genetic Age," Suzanne Anker & Dorothy Nelkin, Cold Spring Harbor Laboratory Press, 2003
- "City Art: New York's Percent For Art Program," Eleanor Heartney, Merrell, 2005
- "The Downtown Book: The New York Art Scene, 1974-1984," Marvin J. Taylor, Fales Library, Austin Museum of Art, Princeton University Press, 2006
- "Papermaking for Printmakers," A & C Black, London, 2006
- "Land Art," Tate Publishing, 2006
- "Espèces d’espace: The Eighties First Part,"Yves Aupetitallot, Le Magasin; CNAC, 2008
- "NextText," Anna Kress and Suellyn Winkle, Bedford/St. Martin’s, 2008
- "The Dorothy and Herbert Vogel Collection: Fifty Works for Fifty States," National Endowment for the Arts, 2008
- "Punk. No One Is Innocent," John Savage, Verlag fur moderne Kunst, 2008
- "Public Art for Public Schools," Michele Cohen, The Monacelli Press, 2009
- "Dead or Alive: Nature Becomes Art," David McFadden & Lowery Stokes Sims, pub Museum of Arts and Design, 2010
- "Mixed Use Manhattan: Photography and Related Practices, 1970s to the Present," edited by Lynne Cooke and Douglas Crimp for the Reina Sofia in Madrid. Co-published by the Museo Nacional Centro de Arte Reina Sofia and MIT Press, 2010
- "Trespass: A History Of Uncommissioned Urban Art," Carlo McCormick, Taschen, 2010
- "This Will Have Been: Art, Love & Politics in the 1980s," Helen Molesworth, Published by MCA Chicago in association with Yale University Press, 2012
- "American Dreamers: Reality and Imagination in Contemporary American Art," Bartholmew Bland, Franziska Nori, The Center for Contemporary Strozzina, Florence, 2012
- "On the Museum’s Ruins," by Douglas Crimp, V-A-C Foundation, Moscow, Russia, figure 55, p. 242, 2014
- "Talk About Street Art," Jerome Catz, Flammarion, 2014
- "Undermining: A Wild Ride Through Land Use, Politics, and Art in the Changing West," Lucy Lippard, The New Press, 2014
- “Carbon Mostly,” Christy Rupp, 2015
- "Politisierung der Kunst Avantgarde und US-Kunstwelt" (Politicization of Art Avant-garde and US Art World), Lutz Haber author, 2015
- "A Book About Colab" Edited by Max Schumann, Printed Matter, 2016
- "Exit Art: Unfinished Memories: 30 Years of Exit Art," Susan Harris (Editor), Mary Staniszewski (Editor, Foreword), Papo Colo (Preface), Holland Cotter (Foreword), Steidl, 2016
- "Openings: A Memoir from the Women’s Art Movement, New York City 1970-1992," Sabra Moore, Village Press, 2016
- "Copyright Protection of Street Art and Graffiti under UK Law," Intellectual Property Quarterly, Issue 2, 2017, Enrico Bonadio. City University London - The City Law School, Lecturer in Law, 2017
- "Magic City," From Here to Fame Books, 2017
- "Birds of the Northeast: Gulls to Great Auks," Fairfield University Art Museum, 2021
- "becoming - Feral" Object A- Creative Studio, 2021
- "D'Arcy Wentworth Thompson's Generative Influences in Art, Design, and Architecture: From Forces to Forms (Biotechne: Interthinking Art, Science and Design)" by Ellen K. Levy (Editor), Charissa N. Terranova (Editor, Series Editor), Meredith Tromble (Series Editor), 2021
- "Noisy Autumn: Sculpture and Works on Paper," by Christy Rupp, Simon & Schuster, Mandala Publishing, 2021
- "Dark Mountain," Issue 21, Spring 2022
- Scott Volz, "Deadly Circularity: Waste and Ecology in Art of the 1970s and 1980s," PhD Dissertation, 2022
- "Somewhere Downtown: Art in 1980s New York," UCCA Museum of Contemporary Art, Beijing, Catalog, 2023
