= Candace Hill-Montgomery =

Candace Hill-Montgomery (aka Candace Hill, born February 9, 1945, in Queens) is an African-American multi-disciplinary artist and writer. Lower Manhattan was the subject matter of much of her early work. She works in photography, mixed-media collage, and watercolors.

== Artist's career ==
Born and raised in Queens New York City she now resides in Sag Harbour. According to Hill-Montgomery, her mother was a strong supporter of her artistic development. She attended Fordham University (B.A., 1977) and Hunter College (M.A., 1981). While an undergraduate, in 1979, Hill-Montgomery was artist-in-residence at the Studio Museum in Harlem and exhibited her work at Artists Space. She was awarded a fellowship from the National Endowment for the Arts in 1981, and a Guggenheim Fellowship in 1985.

In the 1980s, she exhibited at Colab's The Times Square Show (her contribution Remembering Fred Hampton was an installation based on the murder of the Black Panther Fred Hampton), at the Bronx Museum of the Arts, the New Museum, Franklin Furnace, Fashion Moda, and the Maryland Institute College of Art. She made public installations across the city and publishing artist books of poetry, photography, and other texts in important publications like Wedge and Heresies: A Feminist Publication on Art and Politics. In 1985, Hill-Montgomery curated a solo exhibition of Lorna Simpson's work with Lucy R. Lippard titled Working Women/Working Artists/Working Together. She participated in the Race and Representation exhibition at the Hunter College Art Gallery in 1987 and has published essays in the Woman's Art Journal. Her work is now in The New Museum Digital Archive. In May 2019, Candace Hill-Montgomery's collection was exhibited at the Sag Harbor Whaling & Historical Museum. On November 11, 2026, was awarded an Anonymous Was A Woman grant.

== Artist's work ==
Candace Hill-Montgomery's art works use elements of fabric and poetry to convey social issues through the usage of humor and satire. The topics covered in her artworks are racism, poverty and feminism, migrants and refugee children. In particular, her art piece Free Dom with Purchase (a reference to Dom Pérignon, a famous brand of champagne) portrays a Harlem woman who runs a restaurant business to help her local community. For this particular art work, Hill-Montgomery utilized tablecloth and napkins with poetry written on them.

== Bibliography ==
- Short Leash Kept On (Materials / Materialien, 2022)
- Muss Sill (Distance No Object, 2020)
- Evening Tomorrow’s Here Today Since The Hornet Flies I Triangle (Wedge Press, 1983)
- Fire Escape Scrolls (Appearances Press, 1980)
- Historic Extinction (chapbook, 1979)
- Back to the Ash (chapbook, 1978)
