= Jane Dickson =

American painter

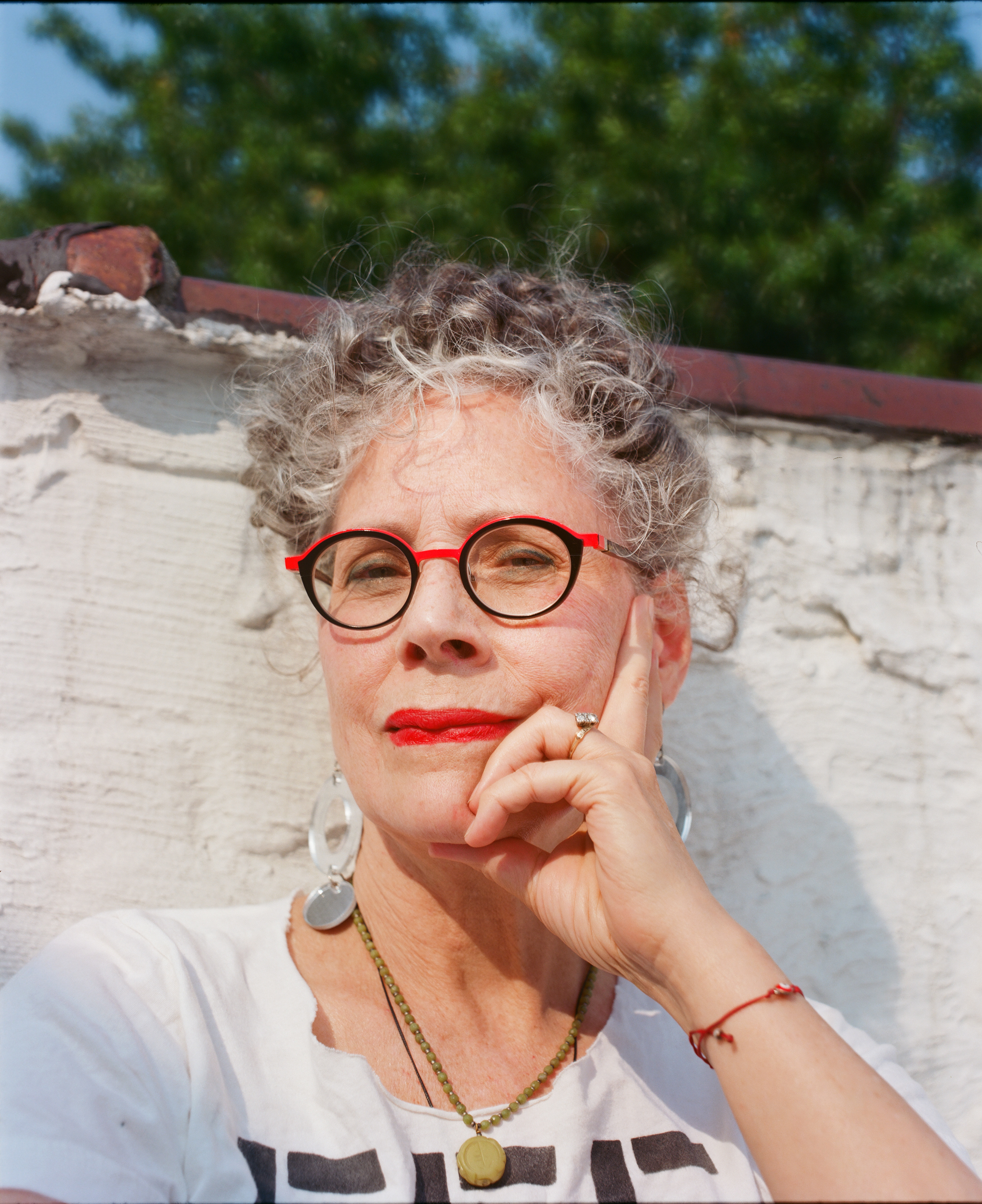
- Born: May 18, 1952 (age 73); Chicago, Illinois
- Known for: Painting, drawing
- Spouse: Charlie Ahearn

Jane Dickson (born May 18, 1952) is an American painter who lives and works in New York City. Her practice explores the psychogeography of American culture and was "forged in the crucible of New York’s late-seventies counterculture, where she participated in artist collectives like Fashion Moda, Collaborative Projects, ABC No Rio, and Group Material."

== Biography ==
Jane Dickson was born in Chicago in 1952. Upon graduation from high school in 1970, she enrolled in the École Nationale Supérieure des Beaux-Arts in Paris. Between 1971 and 1973 she studied at Radcliffe College and the School of the Museum of Fine Arts in Boston where she first met artist Nan Goldin. She received her B.A. from Harvard University in 1976, as well as a Studio Diploma from the School of the Museum of Fine Arts, Boston.

== Artwork ==
Dickson is known for her dark iconic images that examine "the constructed world, and its psychological freight, the social structuring of desire and its disruption by the uncanny". Deploying unusual materials such as AstroTurf, vinyl, sandpaper, felt and carpet, which resonate with their particular subject, Dickson's paintings express her "fascination with the power of artificial light, as well as...surreal and sexually transgressive environment[s]". Often depicting the spectacle in her work, her subjects include Times Square (where she lived and/or worked from 1978 to 2008, participating in the Colab organized The Times Square Show), demolition derbies, carnivals, suburban homes, and highways, among others.

In addition to her large body of paintings, the artist organized “Messages to the Public”, a Public Art Fund series which presented monthly artists’ projects created for Spectacolor's 1 Times Square Billboard. The project ran from 1982 to 1990 and the artists presented include Keith Haring and Jenny Holzer. In her most recent contribution to Times Square, Dickson designed 67 mosaics of New Year's Eve revelers that were installed within the Port Authority 42nd Street and Times Square subway stations. Commissioned by the MTA (Metropolitan Transit Authority) in 2008, the mosaics are composed of Murano glass, and as art historian Janetta Rebold Benton describes, the figures with their party hats and horns "seem able to elevate the moods of the actual people who hurry along the corridor."

== Exhibitions ==
Dickson's work has been featured in 40 solo exhibitions and almost 200 group exhibitions in the United States, Europe, and Asia. Her pieces are in the permanent collections of 25 museums such as The Metropolitan Museum of Art, The Museum of Modern Art (MoMA), The Whitney Museum of American Art, and The Art Institute of Chicago. She received The Joan Mitchell Painters and Sculptors Grant in 2013. She is married to American film director, Charlie Ahearn. Dickson is included in the 2022 Whitney Biennial.

== Bibliography of works by Jane Dickson ==
- Jane Dickson, Jane Dickson In Times Square. Brooklyn, NY: Anthology Editions. 2018. 272 pp. ISBN 978-1-944860-14-1
- Laura Brown, James Fuentes Press #4: Jane Dickson. New York, NY: James Fuentes Press. 2022. 151 pp. ISBN 978-1-7365415-4-8
