= Andrea Callard =

American painter

Andrea Callard (born 1950 in Chicago) is an American media artist connected with the artists group Colab in New York City.

== Biography ==
=== Early life ===
Andrea Callard was born in Chicago in 1950 and grew up in Muncie, Indiana. She graduated from high school at Kingswood School Cranbrook in 1968, continued her education at St. Louis School of Fine Arts at Washington University (1968–1970) and graduated from the San Francisco Art Institute with a BFA in painting in 1972. In San Francisco, Callard found an artistic community that included Jim Vincent, Bonnie O'Neill, Baylor Trapnell, Mac Becket, Carol Williams, Reese Williams, and Robin Winters.

=== 1970s ===
In 1973, Callard moved to New York City and into a raw loft building at 150 Chambers St. Again, Callard found a community of artists including Daisy Youngblood, Joe Haske, Robert Israel and Cara Perlman who lived in the same building and Bernice Rubin who lived in the neighborhood. In 1976 Callard moved to the top floor of 40 Lispenard St. She, Cara Perlman, and Bernice Rubin acquired a net lease for the upper three floors and renovated the building.

Callard's involvement in creating the artist group Collaborative Projects Inc., (known as Colab) was one of her strongest contributions to the New York art community. The organization mimicked corporate structure in an attempt to garner grant support that the organization then redistributed among its members or used for collaborative projects such as television programs. In addition, Colab organized several group art exhibitions from 1979 to 1985, and it actively sought to collaborate with other fringe art groups, most notably Fashion Moda in the South Bronx, resulting in what Lucy Lippard called unprecedented and "fragile cross-class, cross cultural alliances". Colab embodied a rough and highly political art scene that deviated from contemporary art spaces and production practices. Andrea Callard served as Secretary to the group from 1978 to 1980. She and a small group of others produced the Times Square Show of 1980 in an unrented four-story building at Times Square. Her photographs thoroughly document the artworks of the event, a show that challenged many minds about art and culture.

Andrea Callard's professional career also developed during this time period. She made numerous contributions to Colab shows and created many of individual artworks including field recordings, super 8mm films, videos, photographs, drawings, and watercolors. Her artwork centered on issues of environmentalism, which is particularly evident in her Ailanthus series. Additionally, her work attended to issues of cultural change evident in her contribution to the 1979 Custom and Culture II show at the NYC Customs House. In 1977, the National Endowment for the Arts (NEA) awarded her an Individual Artist's Fellowship for Drawing. She also participated in several art residencies beginning in 1978 at the Cummington Community for the Arts in Cummington, Massachusetts. With Reese Williams, Theresa Hak Kyung Cha, and Mark Thompson, Callard started the LINE organization to raise and distribute money for artists' books.

=== 1980s ===
In the 1980s, Callard gradually separated from Colab but continued to look for opportunities to collaborate with other artists. This desire manifests in her 1980 Site, Cite, Sight show with Bonnie O'Neill in San Francisco, her collaboration with Kathy High on a street poster for Colab, her contributions to Steve Ning's film Freckled Rice and her work with Sam Sue on The Tenement: Place for Survival, Object of Reform in 1988. These projects are notable but represent only a portion of Callard's collaborations throughout the 1980s.

In 1985, she founded the Avocet Portfolio with Jollie Stahl at Art Awareness, a multi-arts center in the Catskill Mountains. They worked with Vince Kennedy as he developed his nontoxic water-based inks for Createx Ltd. From 1985 to 1991, Avocet published 48 editions of screenprints by 33 artists from Colab and the wider artworld, many who have become well known since then.

Additionally, Callard participated in numerous art education residencies sponsored by the New York Foundation for the Arts including ones in Malone, New York, at the Hecksher Museum, at the Huntington Public Library, at Carthage Central Schools in Black River, New York, at Rockland Center for the Arts, the Baldwinsville Schools and Studio in a School. Over the years, she has lectured at Williams College, Wake Forest University, the Virginia Commonwealth University, and others.

=== 1990s ===
During the 1990s, she exhibited in solo and group shows including The Waste Stream: at the Storefront for Art and Architecture and a show of master printer's portfolios titled Multiple Connections at the Bronx River Art Center. She also participated in several residencies and visiting artist positions including one at the American Academy in Rome, Italy. Finally, she took on leadership roles as Art Coordinator for the National Council of Jewish Women, Director of Arts and Crafts at Brant Lake Camp, and a Project Arts Coordinator at the New York City Board of Education.

=== 2000s ===
In 2008, Callard earned an MFA in Integrated Media Arts, Department of Film & Media at Hunter College.

In 2010, preservation efforts began on Callard's films, resulting in international screenings of her work. In 2012, Callard compiled many short films and slide shows to create Talking Landscape, Early Media Work 1974-1984. It includes her work on super 8mm film and early video formats.

Working with digital media, she continues to make videos, photographs, texts, and audio compositions.

Between 2008 and 2019, Callard produced over 150 industrial, marketing films for a recycling company based in Oakland, CA.

== Personal life ==
Callard is the mother of Callard Luke Geller who was born in 1988, also an artist. Her parents were Patricia and Charles G. Callard. Andrea Callard continues to live and work in New York City.

== Filmography ==
- Talking Landscape, Early Media 1974-1984 includes:
  - Fragments of a Self Portrait (video, Sony Portapak, sound, black & white, 1974–1975)
  - Drawers (video, Sony Portapak, sound, black & white, 1974–1975)
  - Window Open/Close (Super 8, sound, color, 1974–1975)
  - Balls with Club (Super 8, sound, color, 1974–1975)
  - Sweep (Super 8, sound, color, 1974–1975)
  - Rubber Shoes (Super 8, sound, color, 1974–1975)
  - Delaware Stone Throw (Super 8, sound, color, 1976)
  - Fluorescent/Azalea (Super 8, sound, color, 4 min, 1976, preserved by National Film Preservation Foundation)
  - Lost Shoe Blues (Super 8, sound, color, 4 min, 1976)
  - Flora Funera (for Battery Park City) (Super 8, sound, color, 4 min, 1976)
  - Contact Mics with Cara (Super 8, sound, color, 1977)
  - Lispenard Ladder (Super 8, sound, color, 1977)
  - 11 through 12 (Super 8, sound, color, 11 min, 1977, preserved by National Film Preservation Foundation)
  - The Customs House (35mm slides transferred to video, silent, color, 1977/2012)
  - Notes on Ailanthus (Super 8, sound, color 1978–1979)
  - Commuting from Point to Point (35mm slides transferred to video, silent, color, 1980/2012)
  - The Times Square Show 1980 (35mm slides transferred to video, silent, color, 1980/2012)
  - Pus Factory 1984 (Computer animation on Via Video, 8" floppy disk transferred to 3/4" Umatic, silent, black & white, 1984)
- Other films
  - Some Food May Be Found in the Desert (Super 8, color, sound, 8 min., 1976, preserved by New York Women in Film & Television)
  - Utah Movie Road Map (Super 8, color, silent, circa 1976)
  - Standard Adult Wheelchair (Super 8mm, sound, color, 1977)
  - Sample Map #1 (digital video, sound, color, 13 min., 2013)
  - Something Medical (digital video, animated brain scans, silent, black & white, 2015)

== Bibliography ==
- Magasin. Especes D'Espace, The Eighties First Part. 2008, pp. 178–9.
- Marvin Taylor, ed. The Downtown Book. Princeton University Press. 2006, pp. 13, 34, 86, inner leaves.
- Lisa Phillips. The American Century, Art & Culture 1950–2000. Whitney Museum, photos: pp. 298, 291.
- Holland Cotter. "Way Up In the Bronx a Hardy Spirit Blooms", NY Times. May 7, 1999.
- Robert Kahn, ed. City Secrets Florence, Venice & the Towns of Italy. The Little Bookroom 2001, pp. 292, 296, 320, 340, 346.
- Robert Kahn, ed. City Secrets Rome. The Little Bookroom 1999, pp. 17, 25, 83, 85, 97, 169, 219
- Peter Bellamy. The Artist Project. IN Publishing, NY 1991, pp. 51.
- Roni Henning. Screenprinting: Water-Based Techniques. Watson Guptill Publications 1994, pp. 9, 24, 42, 55, 67, 81, 87, 103, 125.
- Brian Wallis, ed., If You Lived Here...The City in Art, Theory, and Social Activism. The Dia Art Foundation Bay Press 1991, pp. 300–306.
- Andrea Callard & Sue Darmstedter. "The Idea of Pretty," Artists in Residence - Partners In Education. The New York Foundation for the Arts, 1989, pp. 25–26.
- Andrea Callard & Sam Sue. "The Tenement; Place for Survival, Object of Reform", Real Life Magazine. Winter 88/89, pp. 17–20.
- Andrea Callard. Terminal Clusters, drawing, Bomb Magazine #6, 1983, pp. 74.
- John Howell. "Synesthetics", Art Forum, 1985.
- Geurt Imanse. "Colab, Kunst en de Lower Eastside", Metropolis M. Nov.1984, pp. 5–6.
- Sarah Booth Conroy. "Art in Raw", Washington Post. May 4, 1983, pp. 87.
- Sylvia Falcon. "Inside/Out", East Village Eye. June 1983, pp. 33.
- Peter Halley. "Beat, Minimalism, New Wave & Robert Smithson", Arts Magazine. May 1981, pp. 120.
- Jeffery Deitch. "Report from Time Square", Art in America. 9:80. pp. 61–3.
- Grace Glueck. New York Times, May 30, 1980.
- Grace Glueck. New York Times, May 4, 1979.
- John Perrault. "Custom Made" Soho Weekly News. May 17, 1979.
- Willoughby Sharp. Impulse Magazine. Summer 1979, pp. 39.

== Sources ==
- andreacallard.com
- AND - Artists Network Database: Andrea Callard
- The Fales Library guide to the Andrea Callard papers
- Andrea Callard. Flypaper, 1986.
- The biography was originally written by Jessica Shimmin while processing the papers of Andrea Callard for the Fales Library & Special Collections at New York University.
