= Alan W. Moore =

Chicago-born art historian and writer

Alan W. Moore (born 1951, in Chicago) is an art historian and activist whose work addresses cultural economies and groups and the politics of collectivity. After a stint as an art critic, Moore made video art and installation art from the mid-1970s on and performed in the 1979 Public Arts International/Free Speech series. He has published several books and runs the House Magic information project on self-organized, occupied autonomous social centers. His partial autobiography was published in 2022 in The Journal of Aesthetics & Protest as Art Worker: Doing Time in the New York Artworld. Moore lives in Madrid.

== Colab ==
Alan W. Moore worked with the no wave artists' group Colab and helped start the cultural center ABC No Rio in New York City after participating in Colab's The Real Estate Show (1980), one of the best-known artist squat actions in New York history, and the famous The Times Square Show.

Along with Coleen Fitzgibbon, Moore created a film in 1978 (finished in 2009) of a no wave concert to benefit Colab's X Motion Picture Magazine called X Magazine Benefit that documents a performance of Boris Policeband, DNA and James Chance and the Contortions. Shot in black and white super-8 the film captures the gritty look and sound of the music scene during that era. In 2013 it was exhibited at Salon 94, an art gallery in New York City.

In 2017 Moore participated in The Real Estate Show Extended/Berlin: Group exhibition on the subject of Gentrification, Real Estate Speculation and Selling out the City at Kunstpunkt Berlin. This show included many Berlin artists along with four original members of the Real Estate Show (1980): Moore, Becky Howland, Peter Mönnig and Joseph Nechvatal. Howland, Mönnig, Moore and Nechvatal also participated in a panel discussion on Real Estate and Art on June 3, 2017 that was moderated by sculptor Howard McCalebb of Dada Post, Berlin.

== MWF Club ==
Moore created MWF Club in 1986 as a distribution company for Potato Wolf and All Color News COLAB television programs that aired on public access TV. MWF Club expanded to include programs from various other groups such as Communications Update, Downtown TV, Glenn O'Brien's TV Party, New Cinema, Cinema of Transgression, Naked Eye Cinema and numerous artists and filmmakers.

Moore co-curated an exhibition workshop in 2013 entitled XFR STN (Transfer Station) that was held at the New Museum. The opening night featured "Moving Image Artists' Distribution Then & Now" an ersatz assembly of participants in the MWF video club, introduced by Moore, Andrea Callard, Michael Carter, Nick Zedd and Coleen Fitzgibbon.

== After PhD ==
In the early 1990s he went back to school to study an art history PhD. He has written on artist collectives, cultural districts, and cultural economies. The PhD was released in book form as Art Gangs : Protest and Counterculture in New York City in 2012.

Moore has published five issues of the House Magic Bureau of Foreign Correspondence.

Moore was awarded a grant from the Andy Warhol Foundation for the Visual Arts in 2012.

== Selected works ==
=== Books ===
- 2022: Alan W. Moore Art Worker: Doing Time In The New York Artworld published by the Journal of Aesthetics & Protest Press
- 2015: (eds) Alan W. Moore and Alan Smart Making Room: Cultural Production in Occupied Spaces Journal of Aesthetics & Protest/Other Forms Barcelona 978-0979137792 PDF
- 2015: Alan W. Moore Occupation Culture: Art & Squatting in the City from Below Minor Compositions/Autonomedia Brooklyn, NY 9781570273032 PDF
- 2012: Alan W. Moore Art Gangs : Protest and Counterculture in New York City Autonomedia Brooklyn, NY 9781570272370
- 1985: (with Marc Miller) ABC No Rio Dinero: The Story of a Lower East Side Art Gallery ABC No Rio/Collaborative Projects New York

=== Chapters ===
- 2007: 'Artists' Collectives Mostly in New York, 1975-2000' in (eds) Blake Stimson and Gregory Sholette Collectivism after Modernism University of Minnesota Press.
- 2006: 'Welcome to our Resistance' in (ed) Clayton Patterson Resistance: A Political History of the Lower East Side Seven Stories Press.
