= Judy Rifka =

American artist

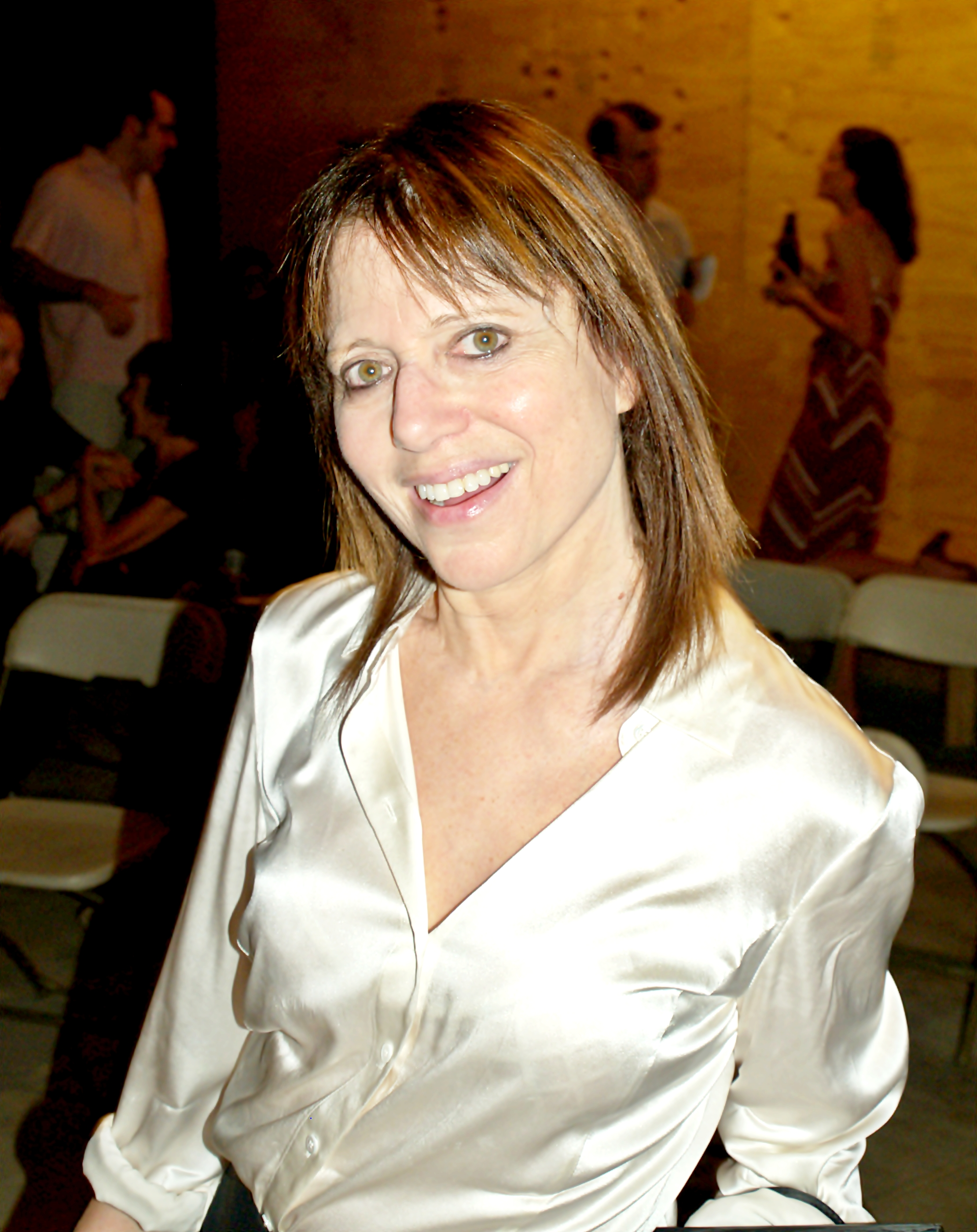
- Judy Rifka (2010)
- Born: September 25, 1945 (age 80); New York City
- Education: New York Studio School
- Known for: Painting

Untitled by Judy Rifka, 1974, acrylic on plywood, 48 x 48 in., Honolulu Museum of Art

Judy Rifka (born 1945) is an American artist active since the 1970s as a painter and video artist. She has worked in New York City's Tribeca and Lower East Side and has been associated in the 1970s and 1980s with the artist's group Colab and the East Village art gallery scene.

== Work ==
Rifka took part in the 1979 Public Arts International/Free Speech art performances, the 1980 Colab The Times Square Show, in two Whitney Museum Biennials (1975, 1983), in Documenta 7, participated in the 1981 Just Another Asshole project, and received the cover of Art in America in 1984 for her series, Architecture. These works employed three-dimensional stretchers that she adopted in exhibitions dating to 1982. In a 1985 review in the New York Times, Vivien Raynor noted Rifka's shift to large paintings of the female nude, which also employed the three-dimensional stretchers.These works were exhibited at Brooke Alexander Gallery. In a 1985 episode of Miami Vice, Bianca Jagger played a character attacked in front of Rifka's three-dimensional nude still-life, Bacchanaal, which was on display at the Museum of Art Fort Lauderdale.

Rene Ricard said of Rifka in his influential December 1987 Art Forum article about the iconic identity of artists from Van Gogh to Jean-Michel Basquiat and Keith Haring,The Radiant Child, "We are that radiant child and have spent our lives defending that little baby, constructing an adult around it to protect it from the unlisted signals of forces we have no control over. We are that little baby, the radiant child, and our name, what we are to become, is outside us and we must become “Judy Rifka” or “Jean-Michel” the way I became “Rene Ricard.” The untitled acrylic painting on plywood, in the collection of the Honolulu Museum of Art, demonstrates the artist's use of plywood as a substrate for painting. Artist and writer Mark Bloch called her work "imaginative surfaces that support experimental laboratories for interferences in sensuous pigment." According to artist and curator Greg de la Haba, Judy Rifka's irregular polygons on plywood "are among the most important paintings of the decade".

In 2013, Rifka's daily posts on Facebook garnered a large social media audience for her imaginative "selfies," erudite friendly comments, and widely attended solo and group exhibitions, both in Manhattan and as far afield as art6 Gallery in Richmond, Virginia and beyond. Judy Rifka's pop figuration is noted for its nervous line and frenetic pace. Joseph Masheck described Rifka in his 1993 book, Modernities, saying that "Rifka’s wit, which luckily keeps up with her anxious agitation, entails putting high care into a ‘careless’ look. And in a world charged with contending impersonal forces, this is like advertising in reverse, ‘pushing’ the individual consciousness in all its brave fragility."

In the January 1998 issue of Art in America, Vincent Carducci echoed Masheck, “Rifka reworks the neo-classical and the pop, setting all sources in quotation for today’s art-world cognoscenti.” Rifka, along with artists like David Wojnarowicz, helped to take Pop sensibility into a milieu that incorporated politics and high art into Postmodernism; Robert Pincus-Witten stated in his 1988 essay, Corinthian Crackerjacks & Passing Go that "Rifka’s commitment to process and discovery, doctrine with Abstract Expressionist practice, is of paramount concern though there is nothing dogmatic or pious about Rifka’s use of method. Playful rapidity and delight in discovery is everywhere evident in her painting."

In 2016, a large retrospective of Rifka's art was shown at the Jean-Paul Najar Foundation in Dubai. In 2017, Gregory de la Haba presented a Rifka retrospective at the Amstel Gallery in The Yard, a section of Manhattan described as "a labyrinth of small cubicles, conference rooms and small office spaces that are rented out to young entrepreneurs, professionals and hipsters". In 2019 her video Bubble Dancers New Space Ritual was selected for the International Istanbul Bienali.
