= Brooke Alexander Gallery =

Art gallery in New York City

The Brooke Alexander Gallery was an art gallery in New York City founded in 1968 by Brooke and Carolyn Alexander in a storefront on East 68th Street. It was a member of The Art Dealers Association of America and the International Fine Print Dealers Association. It closed permanently in December of 2022.

== History ==
Brooke Alexander Gallery began by publishing artists' prints and multiples in the fall of 1968. Since then, Brooke Alexander Gallery published over 1,500 editions. The Alexanders moved the gallery twice in the next few years and in 1972 opened at 26 East 78th Street. The gallery located to 57th Street in 1975 and regularly exhibited both paintings and prints. In 1985 it moved to 59 Wooster Street, in the downtown area of New York City, into an art neighborhood that had been named SoHo and included 83 other art galleries. The art dealer David Zwirner got his start in the art business there.

The Alexanders separated in the early 1990s, and Mr. Brooke Alexander, whose brother was the artist Peter Alexander, became the sole owner/director of the gallery. In 1995, Carolyn Alexander joined with prior Brooke Alexander Gallery director, Ted Bonin (1958-2023), to create the Alexander and Bonin Gallery. In 1997, Alexander and Bonin moved to a three-story building in Chelsea, and in 2016 moved to 47 Walker Street in Tribeca.

Mr. Brooke Alexander died on May 23rd, 2022. He was a member of the International Fine Print Dealers Association and the Art Dealers Association of America and was a board member of the Foundation for Contemporary Arts and the Chinati Foundation. Carolyn Alexander closed the Alexander and Bonin Gallery in 2024 following the death of Ted Bonin in 2023.

== Notice and influence ==
The Brooke Alexander Gallery has been noted for its influence on the late-20th century art scene in New York. Recognizing this, in 1994, 25 years of work at the Brooke Alexander Gallery was honored at the Smithsonian Institution. Wendy Weitman, from the Department of Prints and Illustrated Books at the Museum of Modern Art has said that "Brooke Alexander began publishing prints and multiples in the fall of 1968. [...[ Surveying his publications thus offers a particularly dynamic view of American printmaking of the last quarter century".

== Artists ==
Besides for the publication of Minimalist art prints, the gallery is known for the Colab artists (and friends) it represented in the 1980s and whose careers it helped launch, including:

- John Ahearn
- Richard Bosman
- Jane Dickson
- Jenny Holzer
- Robert Longo
- Matt Mullican
- Joseph Nechvatal
- Tom Otterness
- Raymond Pettibon
- Judy Rifka
- Walter Robinson
- Kiki Smith
- Paul Thek
- Robin Winters

In addition to these artists, Brooke Alexander Gallery also published and handled work by:

- Donald Judd
- Sol LeWitt
- Bruce Nauman
- Barnett Newman
- Claes Oldenburg
- Robert Rauschenberg
- Ed Ruscha
- Fred Sandback
- Sean Scully
- Richard Tuttle
- Lorna Simpson
- Lawrence Weiner
- Josef Albers
- Richard Artschwager
- John Baldessari
- Joseph Cornell
- Sam Francis
- Philip Guston
- Jasper Johns
- Ellsworth Kelly
- Robert Mangold
- Richard Long
