= Ann Messner =

American artist

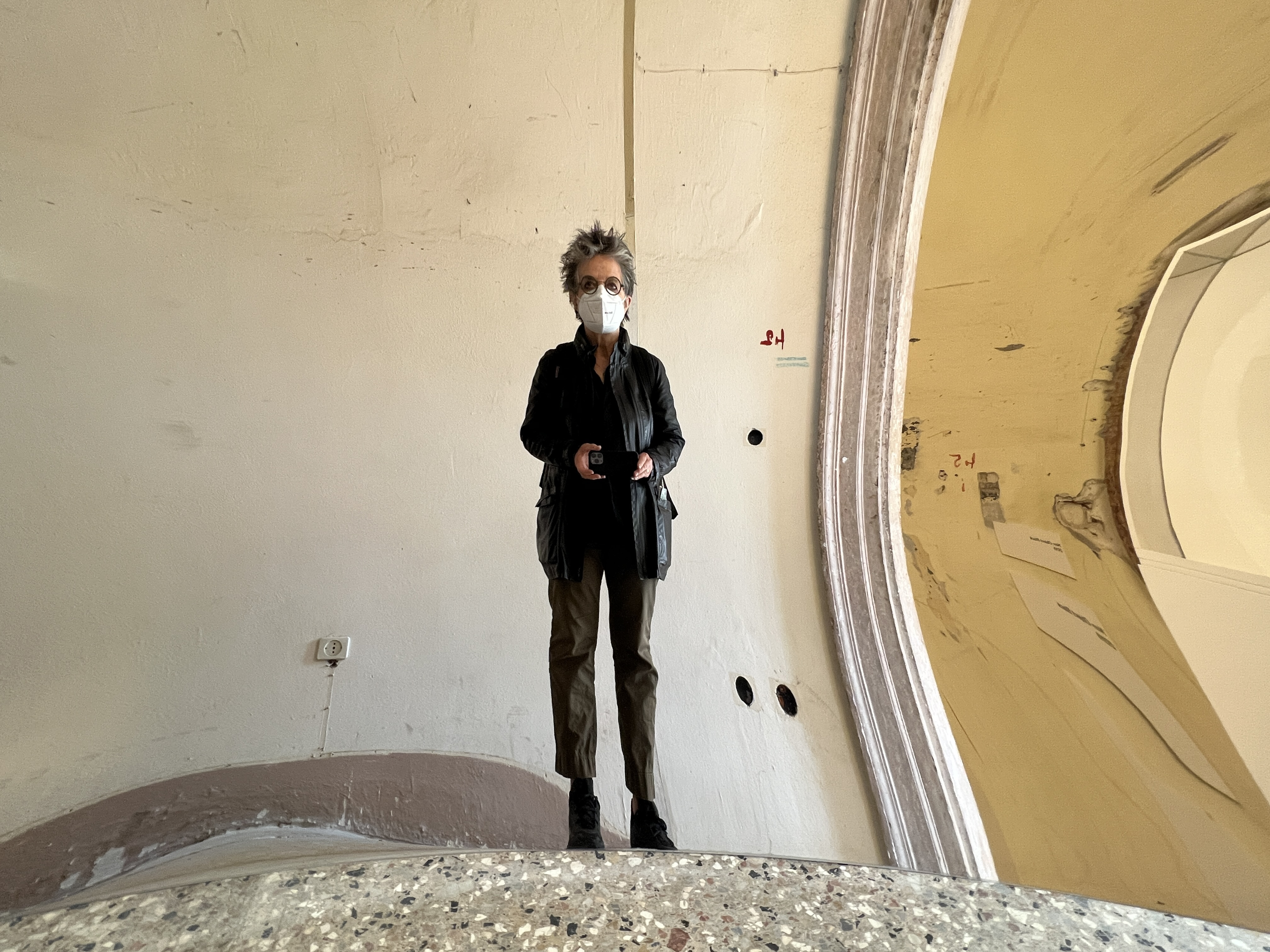
Ann Messner in 2022

Ann Messner (born 1952) is an artist, activist, and a professor of fine arts at the Pratt Institute. Messner received her B.F.A. from the Pratt Institute in 1973.

== Activism ==
Messner was a member of Artists Against the War (AAW), The Critical Voice, and the Activist Response Team (A.R.T.), political action coalitions dedicated to non-hierarchical collective response to political events, specifically the American involvement in Iraq.

Messner is also known for her activism bringing attention to real estate inequalities in New York, especially as a participant in The Real Estate Show, an extra-legal artist occupation of a vacant New York City building (125 Delancey St) beginning on December 30, 1979, in order to mount an exhibition. The show was reconstructed at James Fuentes gallery in 2014 in order to highlight the city's ongoing housing issues; Messner's work for the show consisted of a printed multiple with a souvenir image of a woman in front of the original show marquee board.

Ann Messner, in collaboration with Carole Ashley, Elaine Angelopoulos, Debra Werblud and Larilyn Sanchez created and directed the documentary, Disarming Images, produced by Artists Against the War. The documentation, covering the years 2001-2005, focused on protest groups who inventively spread their word against the U.S. invasions of Afghanistan and Iraq.

== Career ==
Messner's work centers on issues of publicness, transference, and the dynamics of the crowd. In the Subway Series (shown for the first time in 2007 at Dorsky Gallery), works performed on the New York City subway in 1977-79, Messner made a series of interventions into the motion and space of the city. In Frogman, she donned a diving suit, mask, and oxygen tank to make her way through the length of a train. In Balloon, she slowly inflated a large balloon in a subway car during rush hour, forcing fellow riders to shift to make room.

Messner's art practice has included several large-scale public sculptures that are aimed at urban pedestrian spaces. Meteor, installed in New York City's Times Square 1987-1988, comprised five welded steel sculptures with various visual affinities to technology, satellites, and more domestic manufactured items like ironing boards. Amniotic Sea, installed in Foley Square in 1998, consisted of a steel platform, a large resin sac sculpture, and a newspaper vendor cabinet distributing Amniotic Sea tabloids with images of New York metropolitan beaches.
