= Carlo McCormick =

American art historian (born 1960)

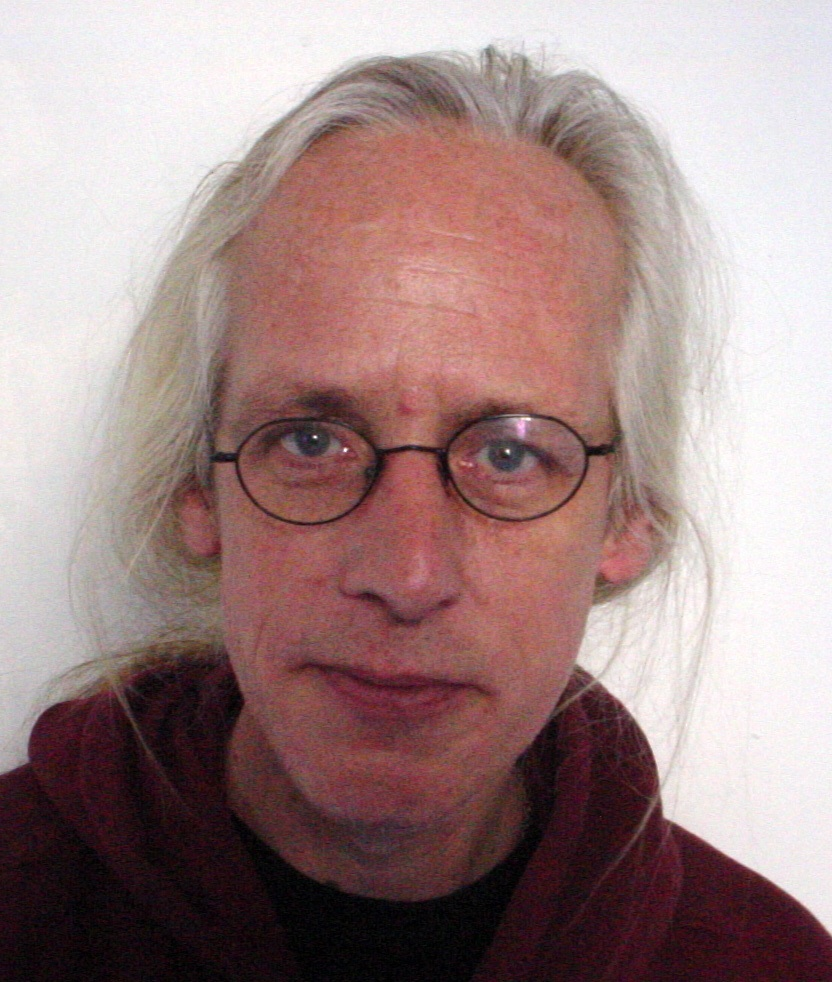
- McCormick in 2012
- Born: 1960 (age 65–66)
- Occupations: Critic and curator
- Notable work: Trespass: A History of Uncommissioned Urban Art
- Spouse: Tessa Hughes-Freeland

Carlo McCormick is an American culture critic and curator living in New York City. McCormick was Senior Editor of Paper. He is the author of numerous books, monographs and catalogues on contemporary art and artists. He lectures and teaches extensively at universities and colleges around the United States on popular culture and art. His writing has appeared in Effects : Magazine for New Art Theory, Aperture, Art in America, ArtNews, Artforum, Camera Austria, High Times, Spin, Tokion, Vice and other magazines.

== Career ==
=== Curatorial work ===
In 1985, McCormick curated the Tellus #8 USA/Germany issue of Tellus Audio Cassette Magazine. McCormick was guest curator of the exhibition The Downtown Show: the New York Art Scene from 1974 to 1984 (in consultation with Lynn Gumpert, and Marvin J. Taylor) that was held at New York University's Grey Art Gallery and Fales Library in 2006. The exhibition examined the rich cross-section of artists and activities that coexisted and often overlapped in Lower Manhattan between 1974 and 1984. Emerging out of the deflated optimism of the Summer of Love (and energized by the enactment of the loft laws that made it legal for artists to live in Downtown New York's industrial spaces) the Downtown no wave scene attracted painters, dancers, sculptors, photographers, musicians, performance art, filmmakers, and writers who could afford the then low rent lofts and Lower East Side tenement apartments.

The Downtown Show: the New York Art Scene from 1974 to 1984 show traveled to the Andy Warhol Museum in Pittsburgh, Pennsylvania (May 20 to September 3, 2006) and the Austin Museum of Art, in Austin, Texas (November 18, 2006, to January 28, 2007). It was chosen as first place winner by the International Association of Art Critics/USA (AICA USA) for best thematic show in New York City in 2005–2006.

McCormick has also curated art shows for the Bronx Museum of Art, the Queens Museum of Art and the Woodstock Center for Photography, and collaborated with The Museum of Sex on their exhibition Punk Lust: Raw Provocation 1971–1985, featuring visuals chronicling the emergence of punk subculture and punk music.

=== Film and media ===
He appears in an on-camera interview in the 2017 documentary film Boom for Real: The Late Teenage Years of Jean-Michel Basquiat by Sara Driver that contains extensive coverage of Colab, The Real Estate Show, The Times Square Show and ABC No Rio.

== Publications ==
- McCormick, Carlo (2006). The Downtown Book: The New York Art Scene, 1974–1984. Princeton University Press. ISBN 978-0-691-12286-1.
- McCormick, Carlo; Schiller, Marc; Schiller, Sara (2010). Seno, Ethel (ed.). Trespass: a History of Uncommissioned Urban Art. Taschen. ISBN 3836509644.
- Corcoran, Sean; McCormick, Carlo, eds. (2013). City as Canvas: New York City Graffiti from the Martin Wong Collection. Skira Rizzoli. ISBN 9780847839865.
- McCormick, Carlo, Magic City: The Art of The Street (2017). From Here to Fame, Berlin. ISBN 3937946705.
- McCormick, Carlo, Reed, Martyn; Hansen, Susan (eds.) (2023) Revisiting 'Trespass: A History of Uncommissioned Urban Art'. Nuart Journal. 4 (1). ISSN 2535-549X.
