= Gregory de la Haba =

American painter

Gregory de la Haba (born 1979) is an American interdisciplinary artist, writer, curator and cultural producer. His work explores themes of addiction, contemporary notions of masculinity and duende.

== Biography ==
De la Haba was born in Astoria, Queens. He received a BLA from Harvard University in 1993 where he graduated cum laude. In 1998 de la Haba married Teresa Maher, heiress to the legendary pub McSorley's Old Ale House. De la Haba was commissioned to paint Maher's portrait by her father Matty Maher to commemorate her being the first female bartender in the bar's 165-year history. De la Haba continues McSorely's long tradition of attracting notable artists and writers like John Lennon, e.e. Cummings, Robert Henri, John Sloan and George Bellows by hosting literary events with contemporary writers like Pulitzer Prize-winning poet Franz Wright, Micah Ling, Douglas Light, Kevin O'Hara, Rob Sedgwick, Jack Brown, TJ English, John Reed, Jeffrey Wright, Joseph O'Connor, and Richard Stratton, among others.

== Career ==
De la Haba's work has been exhibited at galleries and art fairs world-wide, including META Gallery, Monaco, France; East End Collected4, Southampton Arts Center; Design Week Milan; Elga Wimmer Gallery, New York, NY; Mykonos Biennale 2014; Salzach Biennial, Salzburg Arts Festival; Queens International 4, Queens Museum; Kunsthaus Tacheles, Contemporary Istanbul; SCOPE Art Show; Art Basel, Miami and Art Southampton. In 2009 De la Haba was the Artist-in-Residence at Jack the Pelican Presents. In 2004 de la Haba exhibited his McSorley's Sketchbook Series at New York University's Glucksman Ireland House, with an accompanying exhibition catalogue essay written by Pulitzer Prize-winning author Frank McCourt. De la Haba is represented by Geuer & Geuer Art GmbH, Düsseldorf, Germany. A philosophical explication of de la Haba's work can be seen in cultural theorist Bryan Reynolds's book The Transversality of Gregory de la Haba: The Future of Art and Myth Are upon Us.

== Projects ==
Since 2008, de la Haba has produced art-related ventures through his creative platform Bodega de la Haba. Curatorial projects include, Danny Minnick: Liquefied Troubles, 2018, Geuer & Geuer Art GmbH, Düsseldorf, Germany; Frieze Frame: Important Paintings by American Artist Judy Rifka, A 40 Year Retrospective: Paintings from 1974-2016, 2016, Amstel Gallery at The Yard; Leon Löwentruat: Träumereien, 2016, Avant Garde LES in New York, NY; John Havens Thornton: 50 Years of Painting: 1964-2014, 2016, Amstel Gallery, New York, NY; Who Shot Natalie White?, 2016, Featuring Peter Beard, Olivier Zahm, Michael Dweck, Max Snow, Will Cotton, Anna Bloda, Spencer Tunick, and Natalie White, ROX Gallery, New York, NY; Magnificent Obsession: The Early Paintings of Abstract Expressionist Joann Gedney (1948-1963), 2014, ROX Gallery, New York, NY; Pacific/Current, 2014, Featuring Andy Moses, Michael Torquato de Nicola, Martin Durazo, Gregory Siff, and Casper Brindle; (e)merge Art Fair, Washington, DC; What Rules: Featuring Kathy Grayson, Laura O’Reilly, Gregory de la Haba, & Lee Wells, 2014, Cutlog, New York, NY; and Colette Lumiere, Justine’s Reverse Pop Series, 1978-1983, 2013, The Yard, New York, NY. As a patron of the arts, de la Haba sponsored The Beatles Complete On Ukele Awards with David Barrett, 2011 at Bowery Hotel, New York, NY, and in 2009 he established the Carlos Collazo Scholarship at Artes Plasticas in San Juan, PR, in honor of the artist who died of AIDS in 1989.

=== Film and Theater ===
Theater productions include, Hazel: Made In Belfast, 2014 by Terrence Browne, which premiered at Carnegie Hall; Fishing for Paradise, 2014, by Michael Gorman, painting and sculpture by Gregory de la Haba, La MaMa; How And Why I Robbed My First Cheese Store, 2011, by Michael Gorman with Installation by Gregory de la Haba, La MaMa. Film productions include Water Time: Surf Travel Diary of a Madman, 2014 by Allan Weisbecker.

== Writing ==
De la Haba's writings and artworks have been featured in The New York Times, Southampton Review, Rizzoli’s Irish America, NY Arts Magazine, Whitehot Magazine and Quiet Lunch. From 2014 to 2018 the artist co-owned and published Whitehot Magazine and Quiet Lunch. Currently, de la Haba is the international editor for the art and culture magazine, Portray. In the summer of 2020, his memoir, Curriculum Vitae: A Journey from Montauk, Elsewhere and Back, will be published by C&R Press. As a publisher, De la Haba has worked with several contemporary art writers, including Anthony Haden-Guest, Shana Nys Dembrot, Paul Laster and Kara Rooney.
