= Wild Style =

1982 film by Charlie Ahearn

- VHS cover
- Directed by: Charlie Ahearn
- Written by: Charlie Ahearn
- Produced by: Charlie Ahearn
- Starring: Lee Quiñones; Fred Braithwaite; Patti Astor; Sandra "Pink" Fabara
- Cinematography: Clive Davidson; John Foster
- Edited by: Steven C. Brown
- Music by: Fab Five Freddy; Chris Stein
- Production companies: Wild Style Productions, Inc.
- Distributed by: First Run Features
- Release dates: November 1982 (Festival du nouveau cinéma); November 23, 1983 (United States)
- Running time: 82 minutes
- Country: United States
- Language: English
- Budget: $500,000
- Box office: $15,122 (US)

Wild Style is a 1982 American hip hop film written, produced and directed by Charlie Ahearn. Regarded as the first hip hop motion picture, it includes appearances by seminal figures such as Fab Five Freddy, Lee Quiñones, Lady Pink, The Rock Steady Crew, The Cold Crush Brothers, Rammellzee with Shockdell, Queen Lisa Lee of Zulu Nation, Grandmaster Flash, and ZEPHYR.

Filmed in 1981 and completed in 1982, Wild Style premiered in November 1982 at the Festival du nouveau cinéma in Montreal, followed by its theatrical release in the United States on November 23, 1983. The film was later released on VHS by Rhino Home Video in 1997. In 2007, it was released on DVD for its 25th anniversary. A 30th anniversary collector's edition was released on Blu-ray in 2012.

== Plot ==
Wild Style centers around a Bronx teenager named Raymond (Lee Quiñones), who under the pseudonym "Zoro" is a celebrated but anonymous graffiti artist. Raymond scorns a group of graffiti artists, known as the Union Crew, who have turned their talents to legitimate, commissioned murals on the walls of playgrounds and business establishments. Their graffiti murals attracted the attention of Virginia (Patti Astor), a journalist, who brings the uptown hip-hop culture to the downtown art world. There are a series of encounters with graffiti artists, rappers and breakers, leading up to a giant rap-break concert in a Lower East Side band shell decorated by Raymond.

== Cast ==
- Lee Quiñones ("Lee") as Raymond "Zoro"
- Frederick Brathwaite ("Fab 5 Freddy") as Phade
- Sandra Fabara (Lady Pink) as Rose "Lady Bug"
- Patti Astor as Virginia
- Andrew Witten ("Zephyr") as Zroc
- Carlos Morales as Raymond's Brother
- Alfredo Valez as Boy with Broom
- Jason Lopez as MERIT
- Niva Kislac as Art Patron
- Bill Rice as TV Producer
- Joe Lewis as Community Art Organizer
- Glenn O'Brien as Art Dealer

== Production ==
Fab Five Freddy (Fred Brathwaite) approached Ahearn about making a film focusing on what would become known as hip-hop culture and they began working together in late 1981. The idea was a hybrid of narrative musical and documentary, having hip-hop pioneers play themselves in a loosely scripted story shot entirely in the South Bronx, the Lower East Side, and MTA subway yards. Freddy eventually stepped back from co-writing and co-directing with Ahearn ("Freddy didn’t have the focus at that particular time to write or direct," Ahearn said), but helped Chris Stein of rock band Blondie produce the soundtrack. An early version of the Wild Style logo appeared in 1981, when Ahearn hired graffiti artist Dondi to paint the "window down" subway car piece that appears in the film. The Dondi piece was the inspiration for the film's animated title sequence, designed by artist Zephyr and animated by Joey Ahlbum in 1982. The Wild Style mural was painted by Zephyr, Revolt and Sharp in 1983.

== Music ==
Chris Stein of Blondie worked on the soundtrack and score of Wild Style. The original 1983 soundtrack was released by Animal Records. It consisted of 13 tracks recorded by various artists included in the film. A 25th anniversary edition expanded this to 17 tracks, plus a bonus disc of remixes, instrumentals and DJ tools. The album has been described by Allmusic as "one of the key records of early 1980s hip-hop".

== Release ==
Wild Style was first shown at the Festival du nouveau cinéma in Montreal in November 1982. The film had its US premiere as part of the New Directors/New Films Festival at the 57th Street Playhouse in New York on March 18, 1983. Interestingly, the film was shown in theaters in Tokyo a month before it opened at Embassy 46th Street Theatre on Broadway on November 23, 1983. By January 1984, it was being shown in other major cities.

== Reception ==
Vincent Canby wrote for The New York Times that Wild Style "never discovers a cinematic rhythm that accurately reflects and then celebrates the rare energy and wit of the artists within the film." However, he noted that the "subjects are appealing, especially Mr. Quinones, a graffiti artist in real life, and Frederick Brathwaite as a very cool artist promotor."

On Rotten Tomatoes, the film has an approval rating of 90% based on 21 reviews. Metacritic, which uses a weighted average, assigned the film a score of 63 out of 100, based on 10 critics, indicating "generally favorable" reviews. Phelim O'Neill of The Guardian noted that despite the low production values, "nothing else comes close to capturing the atmosphere of the early days of hip-hop and spraycan art..." Reviewing the film for BBC, David Mattin wrote that "Wild Style is a cult classic - indisputably the most important hip hop movie, ever."

== Legacy ==
The plot of Wild Style is fairly loose and the film is more notable for featuring several prominent figures from early hip hop culture such as Busy Bee Starski, Fab Five Freddy, The Cold Crush Brothers and Grandmaster Flash. Throughout the movie, there are scenes depicting activities common in the early days of hip hop. These include MCing, turntablism, graffiti and b-boying. The film demonstrates the interconnections between music, dance and art in the development of hip hop culture.

The film has received a large cult following over the years after its initial release. Highly regarded hip hop albums such as Illmatic by Nas, Midnight Marauders by A Tribe Called Quest, Black Sunday by Cypress Hill, Resurrection by Common, Big Shots by Charizma, Mm..Food by MF Doom, Check Your Head by Beastie Boys, Beat Konducta by Madlib, Jay Stay Paid by J Dilla and Quality Control by Jurassic 5 have used samples from the film.

In 2007, the VH1 Hip Hop Honors paid tribute to Wild Style in recognition of its influence upon the culture. The film was also voted as one of the top ten rock and roll films of all time by the Rock and Roll Hall of Fame. In 2012, Wild Style was ranked No. 1 on Billboard's list of the Top 10 Best Hip-Hop Movies Ever. The film was exhibited as part of a 1980s art retrospective at the Museum of Contemporary Art, Chicago and the Institute of Contemporary Art, Boston in 2012. In 2021, it was shown at the Museum of Fine Arts, Boston to celebrate the closing weekend of the exhibition "Writing the Future: Basquiat and the Hip-Hop Generation."

== See also ==
- Style Wars
- Beat Street
- List of hood films
- The Times Square Show
- No wave cinema
- New Cinema
- Graffiti
- Breakdancing
