= John Ahearn =

American sculptor

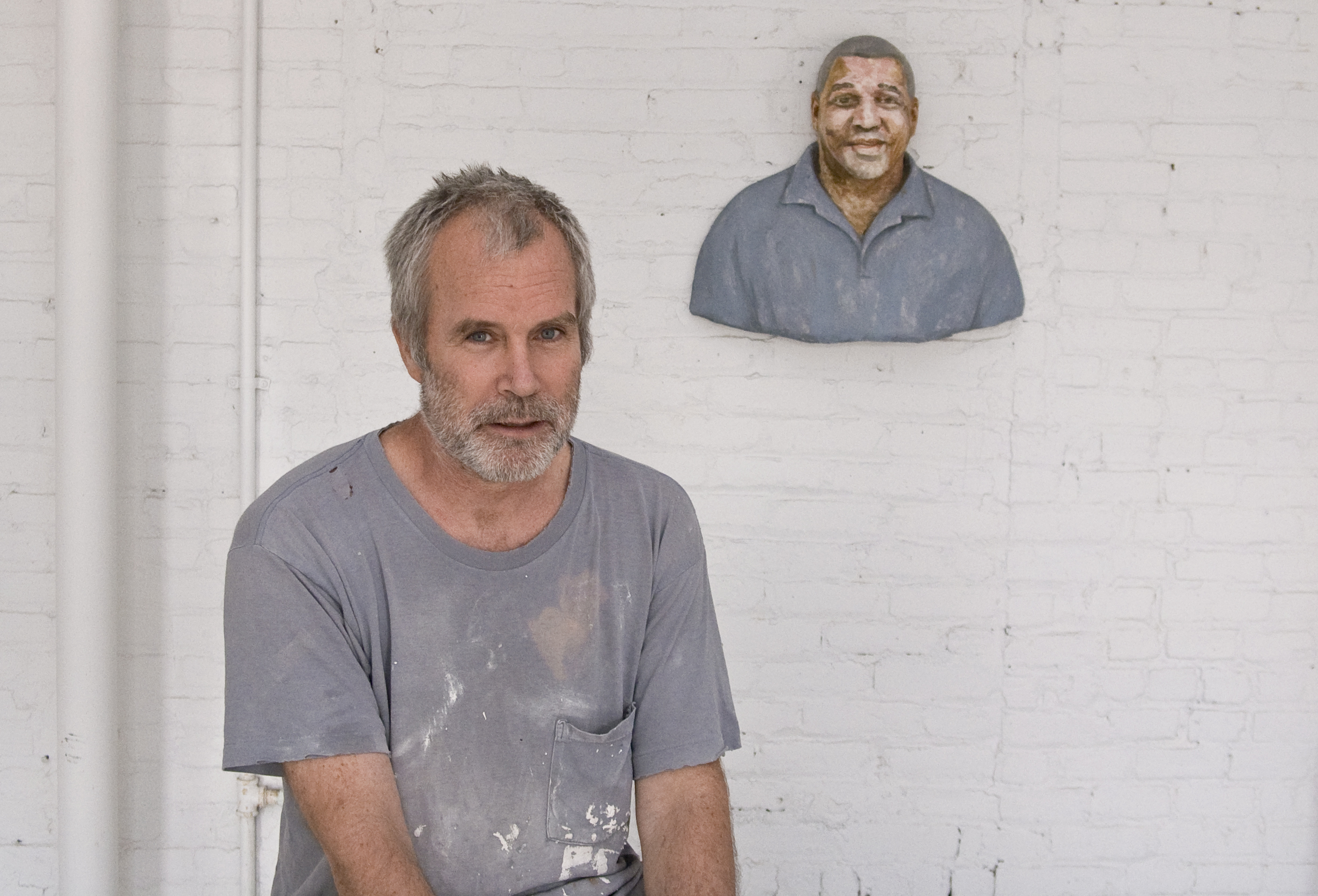
- Born: 1951 (age 74–75); Binghamton, New York, US
- Known for: Plaster casts
- Notable work: South Bronx bronzes
- Movement: Public art; Street art
- Awards: Guggenheim Fellowship (2026)

John Ahearn (born 1951) is an American sculptor. He is best known for the public art and street art he made in South Bronx in the 1980s. On April 14, 2026, Ahearn was named a Guggenheim Fellow.

== Life and art ==
Ahearn grew up in Binghamton, New York, with his twin brother Charlie Ahearn, who is a film director. John went to Cornell University where he discovered art. After trying painting, he started making life casts in 1979 while with Colab, a Manhattan artists’ collective. He made some live life casts at The Times Square Show in 1980. In the 1980s, while he participated in art world venues like Brooke Alexander Gallery and Colab, he also focused his art and life on The Bronx after going to the South Bronx and working on the sidewalk in front of Fashion Moda, casting whoever volunteered. He made two copies of every cast: one for himself and the other for the sitter/subject.

Ahearn has regularly worked with Rigoberto Torres. Torres first assisted Ahearn and then became his equal collaborator. After a decade of intense cooperation, they have been occasionally working together and sometimes alone. Between 1981 and 1985, Ahearn, together with Torres, created four sculptural murals for the sides of tenement buildings: We Are Family, Life on Dawson Street, Double Dutch, and Back to School. They depict everyday life in the neighborhood. Ahearn and Torres's collaborations are included in museum collections across the United States. For instance, the artwork Double Dutch (1981/2010), previously cited, is featured in the holdings of Pérez Art Museum Miami, Florida.

Ahearn's 1991 survey of portraits of ordinary people was called South Bronx Hall of Fame. In 2017, his recent casts were installed on walls on the Lower East Side. He is represented by Alexander and Bonin Gallery in New York City.

== Public Art ==
=== The Bronx ===
John and Rigoberto have sculpture installed on the exterior walls of buildings throughout The Bronx.

- "Double Dutch," 1981-2 is located on Kelly Street and Intervale Ave.
- "Life on Dawson St.," 1981–82 on Longwood Ave and Dawson St.
- "We Are Family" is on Southern Blvd. facing 156th St.
- There are also other casts installed outside The POINT Community Development Corporation at 940 Garrison Ave.

=== The South Bronx bronzes ===
In 1989, Ahearn received the commission to make sculptures for the 44th Police Precinct in Bronx. He thought of Paseo de la Reforma, but instead of heroes, he decided to immortalize people he knew. Ahearn made bronze statues of three black people from his South Bronx neighborhood: Raymond and his pit bull, Daleesha and her roller skates, and Corey and his boom box and basketball. The statues were installed in 1991.

Faced with protests from black bureaucrats on one hand and black neighbors on the other, who believed that the subjects did not adequately represent the community, Ahearn removed the statues five days after their installation. The South Bronx bronzes inspired Jane Kramer to write a long essay in The New Yorker about Ahearn and others involved in the controversy, about art, race and society, which she expanded into a book, Whose Art Is It?, in 1994. The bronzes now stand in the Socrates Sculpture Park in Queens.

== See also ==
- The Rodriguez Twins
