= Coleen Fitzgibbon =

American film producer

Coleen Fitzgibbon (born 1950) is an American experimental film artist associated with Collaborative Projects, Inc. (a.k.a. Colab), including its 1977-78 X Motion Picture Magazine. She worked under the pseudonym Colen Fitzgibbon between the years 1973–1980.

== Career history ==
Fitzgibbon was a student of 1960s Structuralist cinema at the School of the Art Institute of Chicago and the Whitney Independent Study Program where she studied with Owen Land (aka “George Landow”), Stan Brakhage, Yvonne Rainer, Carolee Schneemann and Vito Acconci. Fitzgibbon worked on film and sound projects for Dennis Oppenheim, Gordon Matta-Clark and Les Levine.

Fitzgibbon formed the collaborative X&Y project with Robin Winters in 1976 and helped form the conceptual art project called The Offices of Peter Fend, Fitzgibbon, Jenny Holzer, Peter Nadin, Richard Prince and Robin Winters in 1979 (the same year she performed at Public Arts International/Free Speech). She co-founded the New York-based Collaborative Projects, Inc. (Colab) in 1977, along with forty plus artists. She was president of Colab during the formation of The Times Square Show.

Fitzgibbon and Alan W. Moore created an 11:41-minute film in 1978 (finished in 2009) of a No Wave concert to benefit Colab's X Motion Picture Magazine called X Magazine Benefit, documenting performances of DNA, James Chance and the Contortions, and Boris Policeband in NYC in the late 1970s. Shot in black and white Super 8 and edited on video, the film captures the gritty look and sound of the music scene during that era. In 2013 it was exhibited in 2009 at the Salon 94 art gallery in New York City.

Fitzgibbon has also screened her work at international film festivals, museums and galleries, including: the New Museum, Vienna International Film Festival, Hunter College, Toronto International Film Festival, Museum of Modern Art, Gene Siskel Film Center in Chicago, Palais des Beaux Arts, Brussels, Institute of Contemporary Arts London, Anthology Film Archives, Light Industry in New York City, De Appel in Amsterdam, Exit Art, and Subliminal Projects Gallery in Los Angeles.

Fitzgibbon appears in an on-camera interview in the 2017 documentary film Boom for Real: The Late Teenage Years of Jean-Michel Basquiat by Sara Driver that contains extensive coverage of Colab, The Real Estate Show, The Times Square Show and ABC No Rio.

== Filmography ==
- Land of Nod (1992/2013)
- SYBAR (1975/2012)
- Der Spiegel (1976/2011)
- Document (Public Records) (1976/2011)
- Lower East Side (LES) (1976/2011)
- Dictionary (1975/2011)
- Daily News (1974/2011)
- I.S. Migration (1974/2010)
- Money (C. Perlman and Coleen Fitzgibbon) (1996)
- Restoring the Appearance to Order in 12 Min. (1975)
- TIME (Cover to Cover) (1975)
- FM/TRCS (1974)
- Internal System (1974)
- Beach (2012)
- Rose Selavee (2012)
- Make A Movie (1974/2011)
- Trip to Carolee (1973/2011)
- Portraits 71 -72 (1972/2011)
- Found Film Flashes (1973)
- Gym (1973)

== Documentaries ==
- East Village Artists (1990/2012, video)
- Peter Fend at Essex Street Gallery (1990-2012)
- X-Magazine Benefit (1978/2009)
- Far East Memories: Interview With Hiroshi Teshigahara (1990) (Complete)
- L.M. (1990)
- Virgin Beauty On Ludlow (1989)
