= Colab =

New York City artists group

Collaborative Projects

Colab is the commonly used abbreviation of the New York City artists' group Collaborative Projects, which was formed after a series of open meetings between artists of various disciplines.

== History ==
Colab members came together as a collective in 1977, first using the name Green Corporation, and initially received a National Endowment for the Arts (NEA) Workshop Grant through Center for New Art Activities, Inc., a small not-for-profit organization formed in 1974. In 1978, Collaborative Projects was incorporated as a not-for-profit of its own. By raising its own sources of funding, Colab was in control of its own exhibitions and cable TV shows.

Advocating a form of cultural activism that was purely artist driven, the group created artworks, negotiated venues, curated shows, and engaged in discourse that responded to the political themes and predicaments of their time, among them the recessions of the 1970s, the Reagan era of budget cuts and nuclear armament, the housing crisis and gentrification in New York City, and other pressing social issues.

In order to become a member, an artist had to attend three consecutive meetings. Artists who proposed artistic projects for funding needed at least two Colab members involved in the project.

Colab's administrative structure mimicked that of a corporation or democratic government with elected president, vice-president, treasurer and secretary. The presidents of Colab were Beth B (1977), Coleen Fitzgibbon (1978-1979), Walter Robinson (1980), Kiki Smith (1981), Ann Messner (1982) and Sophie Vielle (1983-1984).

== Projects ==
Colab poster for No Wave band benefit concert for X Motion Picture Magazine including The Contortions, Boris Policeband, Theoretical Girls, DNA, Terminal and Erasers

From November 1978, different artist members organized and installed original one-off group shows in their own studios or other temporary sites, such as The Batman Show, (591 Broadway 1979), Income and Wealth Show (5 Bleecker Street Store 1979), Doctors and Dentists Show (591 Broadway 1979), The Manifesto Show (5 Bleecker Street Store 1979), The Dog Show (591 Broadway 1979), Just Another Asshole Show (5 Bleecker Street Store), The Real Estate Show (Delancey Street, Jan. 1980), Jay Street Film Shows (1979), Exhibit A (93 Grand Street, 1979), Island of Negative Utopia (The Kitchen, 1984) and The Times Square Show (201 W 41st, June 1980): a large open exhibition near the center of New York's entertainment (and pornography) district (Times Square) that was put on with Bronx-based Fashion Moda.

Seed money from the first Colab (Green Corp.) workshop grant through Center for New Art Inc. led to the creation of the Colab artists' TV series on Manhattan Cable (1978–1984) that included All Color News, Potato Wolf and Red Curtain, and New Cinema - a screening room on 8th Street and St. Mark's Place for new wave Super 8 films transferred to video and projected on an Advent screen - the continued publication of X Motion Picture Magazine (1977-8) (a No Wave band benefit concert for X Motion Picture Magazine included The Contortions, Boris Policeband, Theoretical Girls, DNA, Terminal and Erasers); support and inspiration for the ABC No Rio cultural center (1980-82 - ongoing) that was created as a result of The Real Estate Show; support of Tellus Audio Cassette Magazine (1983), NightShift Theater 1979, Spanner Magazine (3 issues 1979), MWF Video Club (established in 1986) and Bomb Magazine (1981). Membership in Colab shifted and evolved over the years, and some members of the original group are still highly visible active making art. In 1980, artists emulating 1970s Puerto Rican activists seized a building on New York's Lower East Side and opened it as a collectively run cultural center. ABC No Rio was passed on to successive managements until today it is an anarchist cultural center run by a collective with close ties to the publishing group Autonomedia."

== A Book About Colab (and Related Activities) ==
In 2016 the organization Printed Matter, Inc published A Book About Colab (and Related Activities). Edited by Max Schumann, the director of Printed Matter, the publication contained a foreword and afterword by art writer and Colab member Walter Robinson. The book traces the output of Collaborative Projects from the late 1970s through the mid 1980s and a provides testimonial about their particular practice of collaboration, social collectivity, and social engagement, while reflecting an iconic period of NYC cultural history. In keeping with the democratic "by and for artists" ethos of Colab, the publication places this material alongside newly solicited texts from many of the group's members – a mix of reflections and anecdotes, statements, manifestos, and excerpts from the ‘Colab Annual Report’, which provide a close perspective on the meaning of Colab for those who came into its orbit.

== Exhibitions ==
In 2011, Printed Matter, Inc. presented an exhibition entitled A Show about Colab (and Related Activities).

In 2012, The Hunter College Art Galleries presented Times Square Show Revisited, an in-depth look at the original Times Square Show (1980). Times Square Show Revisited was the first focused assessment of the landmark exhibition organized by the artist group Collaborative Projects, Inc.

In 2013, an exhibition workshop entitled XFR STN (Transfer Station) was held at the New Museum.

In early 2014, there were four concurrent art exhibitions in New York City around The Real Estate Show: at James Fuentes Gallery, ABC No Rio, the Lodge Gallery, and Cuchifritos Gallery/Essex Street Market. The Real Estate Show Revisited. That year Art International Radio also featured an interview and conversation between Jane Dickson, Coleen Fitzgibbon, and Becky Howland about Colab and the 1980 The Real Estate Show which birthed the ABC No Rio cultural center.

From April 15 to May 15, 2016, Printed Matter, Inc presented a restating of The A. More Store, a Colab-sponsored artists’ outlet for low-priced multiples from the early 1980s The selling exhibition included over 100 artworks from over 50 participating Colab members, including works on loan from historic A. More Stores. The first A. More Store evolved from the Gift Shop at the legendary Colab-organized The Times Square Show and appeared shortly after on Broome Street in 1980 with the tag-line “You won’t pay more at the A. More Store”. Other iterations of the store were later presented at Barbara Gladstone Gallery, Jack Tilton Gallery, White Columns, and Printed Matter, Inc.

The 2017 documentary film Boom for Real: The Late Teenage Years of Jean-Michel Basquiat by Sara Driver contains extensive coverage of Colab, The Real Estate Show, The Times Square Show and ABC No Rio through on-camera interviews with once Colab president Coleen Fitzgibbon and art critic Carlo McCormick. In April 2025, Allied Productions, Inc. co-presented with Colab an exhibition called ABC No Rio 45 Years at the Emily Harvey Foundation in New York City.

== Notable members ==
- Charlie Ahearn
- John Ahearn
- Scott and Beth B
- Cara Brownell
- Andrea Callard
- Ellen Cooper
- Mitch Corber
- Diego Cortez
- Jane Dickson
- Stefan Eins
- Coleen Fitzgibbon
- Bobby G
- Matthew Geller
- Jenny Holzer
- Becky Howland
- Becky Johnston
- Christof Kohlhofer
- Joe Lewis
- Ann Messner
- Eric Mitchell
- Alan W. Moore
- Jamie Nares
- Joseph Nechvatal
- Tom Otterness
- Cara Perlman
- Virginia Piersol
- Judy Rifka
- Walter Robinson
- Christy Rupp
- Teri Slotkin
- Bebe Smith
- Kiki Smith
- Robin Winters
- Sophie Vielle
