= Charlie Ahearn =

American film director and creative cultural artist

- Born: 1951 (age 74–75); Binghamton, New York, U.S.
- Known for: Film, Painting
- Spouse: Jane Dickson

Charlie Ahearn (born 1951) is an American film maker living in New York City. Although predominantly involved in film and video art production, he is also known for his work as an author, freelance writer, member of Colab, and radio host. He is married to the painter Jane Dickson and is the twin brother to the sculptor John Ahearn.

== Career ==
Charlie Ahearn moved to New York City in 1973 to attend the Whitney Museum of American Art Independent Study Program (Studio Program). Later he was joined by his brother John and joined the artists' group Colab (aka Collaborative Projects) which was a group determined to go beyond the traditional art world gallery system and find a way to "be creative in a larger sense".

For several years during the 1970s Ahearn, then living in downtown Manhattan, concentrated on making 16 millimeter art films. In 1977, he went to the Alfred E. Smith Projects on the Lower East Side to film local youths practising martial arts with his Super 8 camera, which exposed him to hip-hop for the first time. Ahearn was approached by some of these local youths who wanted to make a martial arts film, and Ahearn agreed despite never having attended film school and not knowing how to make a feature-length film. Yet he took inspiration from some of his favorite kung fu films, such as 36 Chambers, Mad Monkey Kung Fu, and Five Deadly Venoms; as well as the films of Bruce Lee.

Ahearn showed this martial arts film as part of The Times Square Show in an abandoned massage parlor that Colab had taken over on the corner of 7th Avenue and 41st Street in the Times Square area. Ahearn soon after was living nearby on 43rd Street and 8th Avenue (from 1981 to 1993).

As of 2023, Ahearn is a faculty member at the School of Visual Arts in Manhattan.

=== ’‘Wild Style’’ ===
In the summer of 1980, Ahearn began working with Fred Braithwaite and Lee Quiñones on what was later to become a classic Hip Hop feature-length film: ‘’Wild Style’’. The film took its name from the graffiti painting style of the same name: a style that is very symbolically described as an “energetic interlocking construction of letters with arrows and others that signify movement and direction”.Cooper, Martha & Chalfant, Henry, ‘‘Subway Art’’/ Owl/Holt/Macmillan, 1988. Also in the movie was karate instructor Nathan Ingram (karate). ‘‘Wild Style’’ premièred in 1983 in Times Square, breaking records by selling out at all screenings in the three weeks it played.Cooper, Martha, ‘‘The Hip Hop Files’’. From Here To Fame Publishing, 2004 The highly successful soundtrack of the film, which was composed entirely from scratch to avoid copyright clearances, was produced by Fred Braithwaite, in collaboration with Chris Stein of chart-topping rock act Blondie. Grandmaster Theodore mixed the album and Grandmaster Caz wrote the lyrics.

‘‘Wild Style’’ and its soundtrack have since been regarded as the most accurate portrait of Hip Hop culture and has been cited as the definitive Hip Hop film.Emery, Andrew, ‘‘The Book of Hip Hop Cover Art’’. Octopus Publishing, 2004 Its popularity quickly spread throughout the world.

Ahearn transferred his Hip Hop archive, including detailed ‘’Wild Style’’ production notes, artwork, photographs, and audio and video recordings, to the Cornell University Hip Hop Collection in 2012.Cornell University Hip Hop Collection

The National Hip Hop Museum in Washington, D.C. held a ceremony in Brooklyn in June 2023 honoring ‘‘Wild Style’’.

=== Musical shorts ===
Ahearn has worked on a series of musical shorts. They include:

- Bongo Barbershop (8 minutes, 2005) starring Grandmaster Caz in a battle with Balozi Dola, a Tanzanian emcee.
- Busy on the Beach (4 minutes, 2006) that features Busy Bee Starski taking the audience on a tour of his Baltimore neighborhood.
- Brothers Fantastic (7 minutes, 2007) featuring Master Rob and Waterbed Kevie Kev from the Fantastic Freaks.

(These shorts were included on the 25-year anniversary edition of the Wild Style DVD, released in 2007 from Rhino Entertainment)

- Busy On The Autobahn (11 minutes, 2008) featuring Busy Bee Starski and Ahearn himself.

=== Books and radio programs ===
Yes Yes, Y'all is an oral history of the first decade of hip-hop book by Ahearn published in 2002 by Da Capo Press with over 100 photos.

To celebrate the 25th anniversary of Wild Style, Ahearn also wrote the book Wild Style: The Sampler, published by Powerhouse Books in 2007.

In 2005, Ahearn hosted a weekly talk-music internet radio show on New York's Museum of Modern Art's WPS1.org called Yes Yes, Y'all, with guests such as Biz Markie, Afrika Bambaataa, Rammellzee, Grandmaster Caz, and many more hip-hop icons from 1970 to 1990.

== Bibliography ==
- Carlo McCormick, The Downtown Book: The New York Art Scene, 1974–1984, Princeton University Press, 2006.
