= Fashion Moda =

Art space in South Bronx, New York

Fashion 时髦 Moda МОДА, whose name comes from “fashion” in English, Chinese, Spanish and Russian, colloquially referred to as Fashion Moda, started as a cultural concept guided by the idea that art can be made by anyone, anywhere. Fashion Moda was an art space located in the South Bronx, New York founded by Stefan Eins in 1978. As a museum of science, art, invention, technology, and fantasy, it was an alternative art space that combined aspects of a community arts center and a worldwide progressive arts organization until its closing in 1993.

== History ==
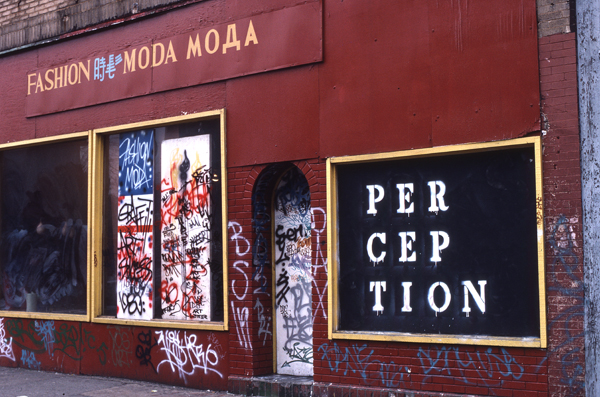
Fashion Moda 1981, South Bronx, NY

Fashion Moda was an art space founded by Stephen Eins in 1978 after closing his previous project, the 3 Mercer Store. Eins was soon joined by artist, poet and musician, Joe Lewis and William Scott, a nineteen year-old from the neighborhood as co-directors. The gallery was located in the South Bronx, outside the traditional art gallery district which was emerging in Soho at the time. Despite this, Fashion Moda quickly became a strong voice in the New York art world during the late 1970s and the 1980s. The venue provided a platform for exchanges between downtown Manhattan artists, graffiti writers, and Bronx residents. The space encouraged the production of creative art, unhampered by the contemporary art market and academic art training. As such, it was a center for many downtown and local South Bronx artists, writers, and performance artists to workshop their ideas and first display their works. Fashion Moda received funding annually with grants from the National Endowment for the Art and the New York State Council of the Arts. In addition to art shows, the space held auctions, performances, seminars, and other events.

With the South Bronx location, Fashion Moda was closely tied to the global emergence of Hip Hop. Wild Style, a documentary by Charlie Ahearn on the manifesto of hip hop used Fashion Moda as studio and subject. Exhibitions and events were usually accompanied by musical performances including those from talents ranging from Afrika Bambaataa or Rammellzee to jazz musicians such as Jerome Cooper and Rasul Siddik.

Fashion Moda played a major role in legitimizing graffiti as an art form by presenting one of the first graffiti gallery exhibitions in October 1980. Curated by the 19-year-old John “Crash” Matos, the Graffiti Art Success for America show featured artists such as Fab 5 Freddy, Futura 2000, Lady Pink, and Lee Quinones. It was one of the first spaces to allow artists to paint directly on the walls and facade of the gallery. This influential show opened up new possibilities for the art form by allowing street artists to connect with critics, collectors, and curators.

Fashion Moda introduced and exhibited a wide range of artists. Fashion Moda facilitated many exhibitions and collaborations between artists. John Ahearn and Rigoberto Torres utilized Fashion Moda as a meeting place and collaborated to create life casts of Bronx locals which were exhibited in the South Bronx Hall of Fame show.

In addition to highlighting new talent, Fashion Moda was a major force in establishing new venues. In 1980, Fashion Moda collaborated with the downtown progressive artist collective, Colab (Collaborative Projects Inc.), on The Times Square Show, which introduced uptown graffiti-related art to the downtown art and punk scenes. Set up in an abandoned massage parlor in Manhattan's Times Square, the Times Square Show included a mock store, performances, graffiti, a punching bag, peep shows, protest actions, and parodic manifestos. The goal of this shows was to legitimize an art form outside of the traditional art scene and exhibit it to the mainstream art world.

In 1982, Fashion Moda was invited to participate in Documenta 7, a quinquennial contemporary art exhibition held in Kassel, Germany. At this event, a store was set up like the Times Square Show where shirts, prints, and novelty items from participating artists could be bought. A video lounge was also set up so that artists’ videos could be watched and purchased. The exhibition reflected the idea of art as a commodity and its power to spread social messages. Joe Lewis left Fashion Moda in 1982, but it continued a program of exhibitions until its official closing in 1993.

== Location ==
Fashion Moda was located in a building at 2803 Third Avenue in the South Bronx. The space was established in a former Salvation Army which was ransacked during the 1977 blackouts. The art space was near 147th Street and the Hub, a shopping center. During the time of Fashion Moda's existence, the South Bronx was a rougher area. The area was stricken by poverty, drugs, and violence. However, during this time, the South Bronx was also an area of intense creativity. The South Bronx location allowed the space and artists who participated in it the freedom to explore the questions "What is art?" and "Who defines it?". In the area, boundaries were being broken and communities were being untied. The location of Fashion Moda allowed it to be a successful art space for many years.

== Bibliography ==
- American culture in the 1980s By Graham Thompson. Edinburgh University Press, 2007. ISBN 0-7486-1910-0
- New York Open to the Public By Cheri Fein. 1982. ISBN 0-941434-26-5
