= Stefan Eins =

- Birth name: Stefan Eins
- Born: April 27, 1940; Prague
- Occupation: Artist / Gallerist
- Website: http://www.oneunoeins.com/

Stefan Eins is an Austrian-American artist whose artwork has been exhibited since 1970. His belief that art and scientific experimentation are one and the same significantly impacted art and society. He is most known for founding the art gallery Fashion Moda that is located in South Bronx, New York.

== Early life and career ==
Stefan Eins was born in Prague during the Occupation of Czechoslovakia in 1940. Eins grew up in Vienna and Gresten, Austria. He graduated from the University of Vienna with a degree in Theology in 1965. From 1964 to 1967 he attended the Academy of Fine Arts in Vienna where he focused most of his studying on Sculpture. In 1967, he moved to New York City.

After Stefan Eins settled in New York City, he began working with all types of media including painting, collage, sculpture, and photography. He ran art spaces, Mercer Street and Fashion Moda. Eins' most well known contribution to the art world was his creation of the gallery Fashion Moda in 1978. Before Fashion Moda, Eins ran the downtown art space Mercer Street from 1971 to 1978. During his time spent curating Fashion Moda, Eins' work was mostly in the form of graphic design of posters and signage. However, he did produce a number of personal pieces in exhibitions. While running art spaces and creating artwork, Eins was also a member of the artist collaborative group Colab.

Eins' work has been exhibited in galleries and museums, as well as New York City streets, night clubs, and parks.

== 3 Mercer Store ==
In 1973, Stefan Eins founded 3 Mercer Store art space where he sold and exhibited his artwork.

== Honors ==
- National Endowment for the Arts, 1980, 1987
- New York Foundation for the Arts 2002
- Adolph and Esther Gottlieb Foundation 2004

== Exhibitions ==
Startin in 1977, Stefan Eins' work has been exhibited internationally. Eins art was exhibited in shows in the National Gallery in Vienna (1991), MoMA PS1 in New York (2007), Now Gallery and other museums and galleries in US and Europe. Eins's exhibit in MoMA PS1 was a collection of digital pictures of splotches.

- 2014 'OTHER DIMENSION', Installation, [New Museum], New York City
- 2013 'NO WAR', in collaboration with Leonardo da Vinci and Peter Paul Rubens, ARTFORUM Magazine
- 2009 'Looking at Music', Museum of Modern Art, New York City
- 2009 'The Picture Generation', Metropolitan Museum, New York City
- 2009 X-TREME Exterior, New York City, Istanbul, Gresten
- 2008 Centre National d'art Contemporain de Grenoble, Grenoble
- 2007 Museum of Modern Art, PS.1, New York City
- 2007 National Kyrgyz Fine Arts Museum, Bishkek, Kyrgyz Republic, Central Asia
- 2006 'The Downtown Show', Grey Art Gallery, New York City
- 2006 Modernist, Büyükada Island, Istanbul
- 2002 Galerie Ariadne Vienna, Austria
- 2002 O.K. Centrum für Gegenwartskunst, Linz, Austria
- 2001 MUSA – Museum auf Abruf, Vienna, Austria
- 1991 Austrian National Gallery, Vienna, Austria
- 1985 Now Gallery, New York City, US
- 1980 Lisson Gallery, London, UK
