= Robin Winters =

American artist (born 1950)

Robin Winters (born 1950 in Benicia, California) is an American conceptual artist and teacher based in New York. Winters teaches at the School of Visual Arts (SVA), in New York City.

== Early life and education ==
Winters was born in Benicia, California, in 1950 to lawyer parents. Winters attended Benicia High School until the end of his sophomore year after which he traveled to British Columbia to a take part in a Quaker school work-study program. After traveling briefly to Alaska, Winters returned to Benicia in 1968 and worked in the Weldon Leather Tannery, the Allied Products Wire Wonder Utility Factory making laundry baskets, and the Clearwater Ranch in Cloverdale, California, where he was a counselor for autistic children.

Also in 1968, Winters had his first art performance entitled Norman Thomas Traveling Museum in which Winters drove a Volkswagen bus decorated in collage which had many images relating to current events and current politics. Inside the bus was what Winters described as a "reliquary" containing many objects, including a bottle collection.

== Art career ==
Winters is known for creating solo exhibitions containing an interactive performance art component to his installations. As an early practitioner of Relational Aesthetics, Winters has incorporated such devices as blind dates, double dates, dinners, fortune telling, and free consultation in his performances. Throughout his career he has engaged in a wide variety of media, such as performance art, film, video art, the writing of prose and poetry, photography, installation art, printmaking, drawing, painting, ceramic sculpture, bronze sculpture, and glassblowing.

Recurring imagery in his work includes faces, boats, cars, bottles, hats, and the fool. Winters has been quoted as saying, "My work is about the interplay between the artist and viewer."

=== 1970s ===
In 1974, Winters performed The Secret Life of Bob-E or Bob-E Behind the Veil eight hours a day, five days a week for a month in his studio apartment. Behind a one-way mirror the audience could watch Winters play the character of Bob-E, whose goal was to make a monument for everyone in the world in the form of blue and yellow rubber top hats. By the end of the month the artist had constructed 262 hats.

The following year, Winters was invited to take part in the Whitney Museum's 1975 Biennial Exhibition. Entitled W.B. Bearman Bags a Job or Diary of a Dreamer, Winters' piece for the Biennial was the first durational performance in the museum where he traveled by subway to the museum, sometimes in a bear or other masks. There he would punch into a time clock and enter a self-made box divided into two parts, one part for the artist and the smaller part for the audience. The two sections were divided by a one-way mirror which the artist used to give the audience occasional glimpses of his environment.

Winters could also play music, speak to the audience, and even tell their fortune through a microphone installed in the box. Throughout the rest of 1975 and 1976 Winters traveled throughout Europe and North Africa, showing a solo exhibition entitled Dedication to the Man Whose Main Job Was Testing Whistling Tea Kettles in 1975 at the Konrad Fischer Gallery in Düsseldorf, West Germany.

Also in 1976, Winters formed the partnership "X&Y" with fellow artist Coleen Fitzgibbon that would last two years. Together they performed a series of shows in the Netherlands, most notably a show entitled Take the Money and Run. Performed at De Appel in Amsterdam, the show involved the artists robbing their audience. The following day the audience was given an apology, as well as the opportunity to retrieve any valuables and participate in a lottery to win the artists' services. They also made a Super 8 film in NY called Rich-Poor, in which they asked people on the streets their thoughts on the rich and poor.

As they became more involved in their own work and producing Colab group exhibitions, Winters and Fitzgibbon ended their partnership as X&Y.

Winters produced several early Colab exhibitions at his studio, including The Doctors and Dentists Show, The Dog Show, and The Batman Show, which was organized by Diego Cortez.

=== 1980s ===
In 1980 Winters participated in Colab's The Times Square Show, The Real Estate Show and in Absurdities at ABC No Rio. That same year he and artists Peter Fend, Coleen Fitzgibbon, Peter Nadin, Jenny Holzer, and Richard Prince also formed The Offices of Fend, Fitzgibbon, Holzer, Nadin, Prince & Winters. This short-lived collective was based out of an office on lower Broadway and offered "Practical Esthetic Services Adaptable to Client Situation", as stated on their business card. Their goal was to offer their art as "socially helpful work for hire".

In June of that year Winters participated in The Times Square Show, Colab's most well-known exhibition. The month-long show took place in a four floor building on West 41st Street and was densely packed with art. To cap off a busy year, Winters also became one of the first artists to join the Mary Boone Gallery, showing a successful solo exhibition in 1981. In 1982, Winters had his first solo exhibition in Los Angeles at the Richard Kuhlenschmidt Gallery

At the Mo David Gallery in 1984, Winters created an installation piece that consisted of a floor of plaster tiles. Underneath each tile, hidden from view, was a drawing. The same year, Winters performed Please Don't Disturb me While I'm Drawing in the Perfo 2 festival at Lantaren/Venster in Rotterdam in the Netherlands. While there, he offered his aesthetic services to all of the other artists in attendance and he designed the stage sets for the musician Nico, and assisted French artist Orlan, American artist Stuart Sherman, and American poet Gregory Corso.

Two years later Winters was invited to take part in Chambres d'Amis (In Ghent there is Always a Free Room for Albrecht Durer) in Ghent, Belgium. In it, 51 artists created installations in 50 different sites, mostly private homes. Winters chose the home of a local art historian. Winters made 90 drawings based on images found in the large collection of art books in the home's library. He made two copies of each drawing and placed the originals in the books themselves. One set of copies was exhibited in the sponsoring museum, Museum van Hedendaagse, as "The Ghent Drawings". The drawings were also on display at Winters' solo exhibition at Luhring Augustine & Hodes Gallery in New York City in 1987.

In 1986, Winters had a solo exhibition at Maurice Keitelman Gallery in Brussels, Belgium, and the following year a solo exhibition at the Centre Régional d'Art Contemporain Midi-Pyrénées in Toulouse, France. Also in 1986, Winters' Playroom was held at the Institute of Contemporary Art, Boston. The exhibition was part of Think Tank, a retrospective of Winters' work which traveled to the Stedelijk Museum in the Netherlands, the Centre Regional d'Art Contemporain in France, and the Contemporary Arts Center in Ohio.

Winters spent a month in 1989 working with students at the San Francisco Art Institute. Also that year, Winters was a visiting artist at the Pilchuck Glass School.

=== 1990s ===
In the summer of 1990, Winters interviewed fellow artist Kiki Smith for her eponymous book, which was published later that year. That same year (1990), Winters was invited by the Val Saint Lambert glass factory in Belgium to create glassworks in their facility that were exhibited in 1990 at the Centre d'Art Contemporain Geneve in Geneva, Switzerland. Later in the year they were included in his solo exhibition at Brooke Alexander Gallery in New York City. They were also shown at Facts and Rumours, an exhibition at the Witte de With Center for Contemporary Art in Rotterdam, the Netherlands in 1991.

== Awards ==
- 1978 New York State Council on the Arts Grant
- 1980 National Endowment for the Arts Grant
- 1985 Engelhard Foundation Grant
- 1991 New York Foundation for the Arts Grant
- 1998 John Simon Guggenheim Memorial Foundation Fellowship in Fine Arts

== Collections ==
- Museum Boijmans Van Beuningen
- Brooklyn Museum
- Centraal Museum
- Groninger Museum
- List Visual Arts Center
- MacArthur Foundation
- Metropolitan Museum of Art
- Museum of Modern Art
- National Gallery of Art
- New Museum
- Princessehof Ceramics Museum
- Philadelphia Museum of Art
- San Francisco Museum of Modern Art
- Stedelijk Museum
- The Arts Club – Chicago, IL
- Berkeley Art Museum and Pacific Film Archive
- Whitney Museum of American Art
- Williams College Museum of Art
