= Charles G. Callard =

American businessman

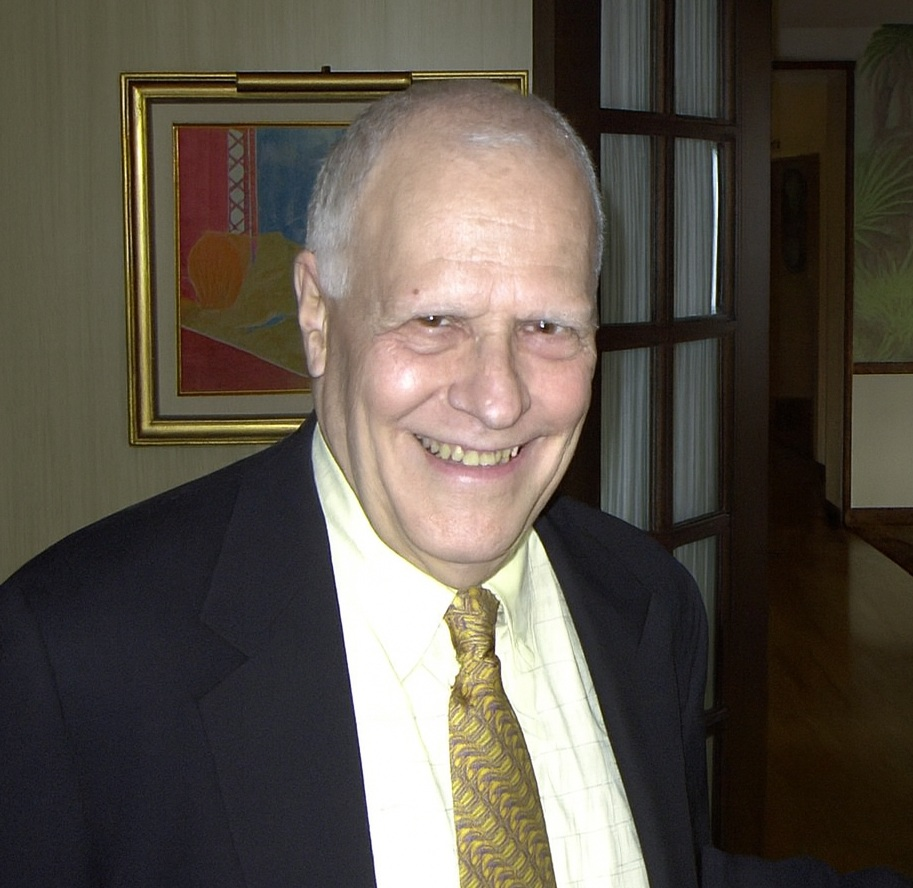
Chuck Callard birthday party May 31, 2003

Charles "Chuck" Gordon Callard (2 June 1923 – 1 May 2004) was a prominent figure in the financial community due to his innovative application of mathematics and statistics to stock analysis. Born in Lansing, Michigan, he was a Corsair fighter pilot on an aircraft carrier while serving in the United States Navy during World War II. After his military service, Callard earned his MBA at the University of Chicago Graduate School of Business in 1943. He then taught statistics at Miami University in Oxford, Ohio for several years.

Callard worked as a securities analyst in Chicago. He then held marketing and planning positions at Armour & Co. and Ball Brothers. In 1969, Callard left the corporate sector and started Callard, Madden & Associates. The insights that he developed became a bridge between academic finance and the worlds of corporate finance and asset management. Callard was the first in the inflationary 1970s to adjust standard accounting data so that they would conform with the financial concepts then being developed at the Graduate School of Business. He recognized the flaws in the traditional accounting measures and developed alternative economic measures of corporate performance. He used this approach to demonstrate that the effective corporate tax rates were much higher than the legislated rates and differed greatly among firms that otherwise appeared to be subject to the same tax rates.

One of Callard's greatest contributions was to develop a systematic explanation of the cost of capital for individual firms. The cost of capital for all firms varied in response to changes in the national inflation rate and to changes in corporate tax rates. The cost of capital for individual firms was affected by the levels and the rates of growth of their anticipated profits and by the variability of their cash flows. Similarly a cost of capital could be assigned to each of the business units within a firm.

Callard's insights extended to capital structure; he distinguished between the costs of debt capital and the costs of equity capital, which varied extensively relative to each other over the phases of the business and economic cycle. While each firm was a price-taker in the capital market, each could affect its aggregate cost of capital by altering the shares of debt and of equity in its capital structure. Some firms were too extensively leveraged and could reduce their costs of capital by reducing the debt component of their capital structure while other firms could reduce their costs of capital by increasing the debt component.

Chuck Callard died in 2004.

A group study room was dedicated in his memory at the Booth School of Business.
