= Janetta Rebold Benton =

American art historian

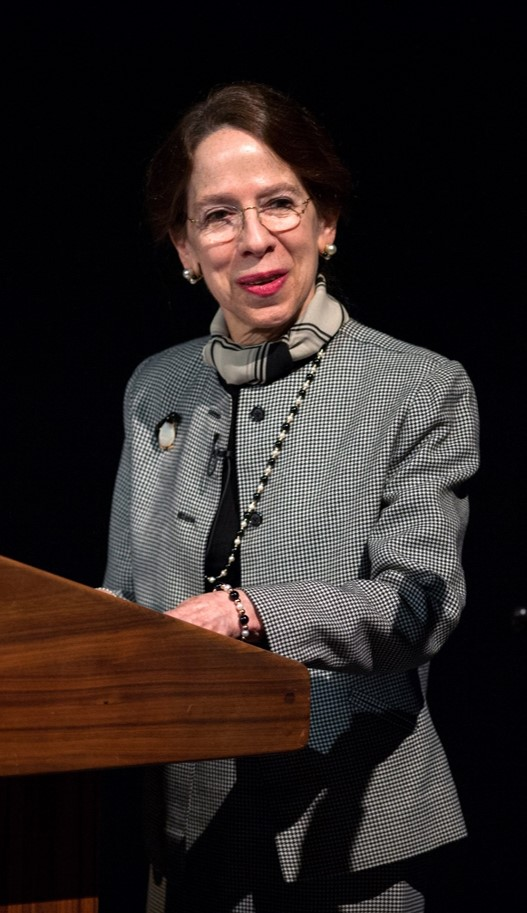
Janetta Rebold Benton lecturing at the Schimmel Center for the Arts, 2014. Photograph by Kevin Yatarola. Used with permission.

Janetta Rebold Benton is an American art historian. She is currently Distinguished Professor of Art History at Pace University in New York.

== Education ==
Benton received a Bachelor of Fine Arts from Cornell University in 1967 and a Master of Arts degree from George Washington University in 1969. She received a PhD from Brown University in 1980. She also earned an MDP diploma from the Management Development Program at the Harvard University Graduate School of Education.

== Career ==
Her main focus of study is the art of the medieval and Renaissance periods. She has a particular interest in iconography, including images of animals, especially fantastic fauna and gargoyles.

In 2012 she received a Fulbright Senior Scholar Award to teach at the Graduate School of Art History, European University, St. Petersburg, Russia.

In 2018 Benton received a second Fulbright award to teach at the Graduate School of Art History of the China Academy of Art, Hangzhou.

She taught art history courses at the American Embassy in Paris, 1981–85.

Benton has presented subscription lecture series for the Smithsonian Associates in Washington, DC, 1988–today, and at the Metropolitan Museum of Art in New York every season 1988–2011. She serves as the Expert on trips abroad for Smithsonian Journeys and the Metropolitan Museum of Art.

In 1995 she was the guest curator and catalog author for an exhibition on "Medieval Monsters: Dragons and Fantastic Creatures" at the Katonah Museum of Art.

== Bibliography ==
=== Books ===
- Janetta Rebold Benton, The History of Western Art (2022, ISBN 978-0-500-29665-3), editions in Latvian, German, Spanish
- Janetta Rebold Benton, How to Understand Art (2021, ISBN 978-0-500-29583-0). editions in French German, Italian, Spanish, Latvian, Chinese
- Janetta Rebold Benton and Robert DiYanni, Handbook for the Humanities (2014, ISBN 978-0205161621). edition in Chinese
- Janetta Rebold Benton and Robert DiYanni, Arts and Culture: An Introduction to the Humanities. 4th edition (2012, ISBN 978-0132134965), edition in Chinese
- Janetta Rebold Benton, Materials, Methods and Masterpieces of Medieval Art (2009, ISBN 978-0275994181)
- Janetta Rebold Benton, Medieval Mischief: Wit and Humour in the Art of the Middle Ages (2004, ISBN 978-0750927734)
- Janetta Rebold Benton, Art of the Middle Ages (2002, ISBN 978-0500203507)
- Janetta Rebold Benton, Holy Terrors: Gargoyles on Medieval Buildings (1997, ISBN 978-0789201829), edition in French
- Janetta Rebold Benton, Medieval Monsters: Dragons and Fantastic Creatures (1995, ISBN 0-915171-38-4)
- Janetta Rebold Benton, The Medieval Menagerie: Animals in the Art of the Middle Ages (1992, ISBN 978-1558591332), edition in French

=== Other publications ===
- Contributor to The Encyclopedia of Humor Studies
- Contributor to The Metropolitan Museum of Art’s exhibition catalog, Set in Stone: The Face in Medieval Sculpture
