= Matty Maher =

Irish hurler

Personal information
- Native name: Maitiú Ó Meachair (Irish)
- Nickname: Matty
- Born: 1854 Thurles, County Tipperary, Ireland
- Died: 14 October 1931 (aged 77) Thurles, County Tipperary, Ireland
- Occupation: Mason

Sport
- Sport: Hurling
Club
- Years: Club
- Thurles
Inter-county
- Years: County
- 1887-1894: Tipperary
Inter-county titles
- Munster titles: 0
- All-Irelands: 1

Matthew Maher (1854 – 14 October 1931) was an Irish hurler who played for the Tipperary senior team.

Maher made his first appearance for the team during the 1887 championship and was a regular member of the panel at various times until his retirement after the 1894 championship. During that time he won one All-Ireland medal.

At club level, Maher was a one-time county club championship medalist with Thurles.
