= The Real Estate Show =

Artistic exhibition in New York City

Coordinates: 40.7182°N 73.9881°W

The Real Estate Show poster by Becky Howland

The Real Estate Show was a short-term occupation art exhibition held on New Year's Day (January 1, 1980) in a vacant city-owned building at 123 Delancey Street on the Lower East Side of Manhattan, New York City by New York artists' group Colab. As stated in “The Real Estate Show Manifesto or Statement of Intent”, the subject of the exhibition was resistance to abusive landlord speculation within the real estate industry.

== Exhibition ==
The Real Estate Show art occupation followed a year of campaigning to rent the property for an exhibition space from officials of the New York City Department of Housing Preservation and Development (aka HPD). Having no success in renting the abandoned space, Colab members broke in and installed an art group show. The Real Estate Show was to be a two-week occupation/exhibit, free to the public, but was quickly closed down by the police.

This brief exhibition went on to inspire a much larger and longer lasting Colab exhibition called The Times Square Show.

== Eviction ==
On the morning of January 2, the Colab artists discovered the storefront padlocked shut and their work locked inside. Phone calls revealed it to be the doing of HPD. The Real Estate Show had been open exactly one day.

On January 8, the artists, accompanied by art dealer Ronald Feldman and German conceptual artist Joseph Beuys, at the invitation of Art Corp. Inc. co-founder John DiLeva-Halpern, assembled at the site to protest its closing in the company of reporters from the New York Times, SoHo Weekly News, and the East Village Eye. There was a photograph taken of Beuys at the front door of The Real Estate Show standing with John DiLeva-Halpern, Ronald Feldman, Alan W. Moore and Joseph Nechvatal taken that day.

On January 11 city workers swept into 123 Delancey, cleared out the exhibited work and trucked it to an uptown warehouse. It was not until a few days later that artists were granted entry into the warehouse to take their artworks home.

== ABC No Rio ==
On January 16, a deal was reached with the city that gave birth to ABC No Rio when the artists were given control of nearby 156 Rivington Street as a compromise.

== The Real Estate Show Revisited ==
In early 2014, there were four concurrent art exhibitions in New York City around The Real Estate Show: at James Fuentes Gallery, ABC No Rio, the Lodge Gallery, and Cuchifritos Gallery/Essex Street Market.

In June 2017, Becky Howland & Matthias Mayer curated The Real Estate Show at Spor Klubu in Berlin, drawing from documentation of the original Real Estate Show (1980) from the Archive Collection of the extant project space ABC No Rio. Included in the show were Robert Cooney, Mitch Corber, Peter Fend, Coleen Fitzgibbon, Bobby G (aka Robert Goldman), Ilona Granet, Becky Howland, Christof Kohlhofer, Gregory Lehmann, Ann Messner, Peter Mönnig, Alan W. Moore, John D Morton, Joseph Nechvatal, Cara Perlman, Scott Pfaffman, Christy Rupp and Robin Winters. In conjunction with this show, another exhibition called The Real Estate Show Extended/Berlin: Group exhibition on the subject of Gentrification, Real Estate Speculation and Selling out the City was presented at Kunstpunkt Berlin. This show included many Berlin artists along with four original members of the Real Estate Show (1980): Becky Howland, Peter Mönnig, Alan Moore, and Joseph Nechvatal. Howland, Mönnig, Moore and Nechvatal also participated in a panel discussion on Real Estate and Art on June 3, 2017 that was moderated by Howard McCalebb of Dada Post, Berlin.

== See also ==
- Colab – New York City artists group
- Mudd Club – Former nightclub in New York City
- Just Another Asshole – American mixed media project (1978 -1987)
- No Wave Cinema – American film movement from the 1970s and 1980s
- Post-punk – Subgenre and period of rock music
- The Times Square Show – 1980 art exhibition in New York City
