= Joe Lewis (artist) =

American artist and academic (born 1953)

- Born: Joseph S. Lewis III; 1953; New York City
- Known for: Digital art, Photography, Performance Art, Art Education, Fashion Moda, African American History, community-based art-making, Digital Dye-sublimation printing, Post-conceptual art
- Awards: Phi Kappa Phi, Thomas J. Watson Fellowship Academy of American Poets Award, National Endowment for the Arts, Design Annual Award of Excellence for Public Service Communication Arts

Joe Lewis (Joseph S. Lewis III; born 1953 in New York City) is a post-conceptual non-media specific American artist, musician, writer and art educator. Lewis was co-founding director of Fashion Moda in New York, where he curated and mounted numerous exhibitions and performance events. He also early on has been associated with Colab and ABC No Rio and appeared in the 1982 seminal American hip hop film Wild Style.

Lewis received his bachelor’s in 1975 from Hamilton College, and then his M.F.A. in 1989 from Maryland Institute. He served as a faculty member at California Institute of the Arts (CalArts) from 1991 to 1995, and then as chair of the Department of Art at California State University, Northridge from 1995 to 2001. In 2001, he became the Dean of the School of Art & Design at the Fashion Institute of Technology in New York City. In 2004, he was appointed Dean of the School of Art & Design in the New York State College of Ceramics at Alfred University in New York State. He became the Dean of Claire Trevor School of the Arts at the University of California, Irvine in 2010 until resigning. He remains on the faculty of UCI.

Currently, he is president of the Noah Purifoy Foundation located in Joshua Tree, California and is on the Board of Directors for Project Hope Alliance (whose mission is to end homelessness) and California Lawyers for the Arts. Lewis has been active in the National Association of Schools of Art and Design, the College Art Association, Bronx Museum of the Arts and has written art criticism for Art in America, Contemporânea, LA Weekly and Artforum.

== Collections ==
- Museum of Modern Art, New York
- Studio Museum in Harlem, Harlem New York
- Contemporary Arts Center, Cincinnati, Cincinnati
- Los Angeles County Museum of Art, Los Angeles
- Spencer Museum of Art, Lawrence, Kansas
- University of Colorado Boulder Art Museum, Boulder, Colorado

== Awards, commissions & fellowships ==
- 2017 Paradise AIR, Matsudo City, Chiba, Japan
- 2016 Fragrance Research Fellow, Soley Organics, Reykjavík, Iceland
- 2015 Fljótstunga Residency Grant, Iceland
- 2011 Named Orange County’s Hot 25, OC Metro Magazine
- 2011 Curatorial Grant, Let’s Get Lost: Polaroids form the Coast LAX Airport, Department of Cultural Affairs, Los Angeles
- 2008 Inducted into Phi Kappa Phi Honor Society
- 2008 Deutsche Bank Fellow Photography Fellowship, New York Foundation for the Arts
- 1998 Listed in Who’s Who in American Art
- 1996 Award of Excellence, Design Annual, Public Service, Communication Arts
- 1995 Commission, California Towers Project, Riverside, CA
- 1993 National Endowment for the Arts, Exhibitions Grant, Hillwood Museum, Long Island University, NY
- 1992 Commission, Art for Rail Transit, METRO/BLUE LINE, LACTC, Los Angeles, CA
- 1999 Lead Artist, Commission, Chandler Outdoor Gallery Project, 4/5ths of a mile of murals produced in the Chandler Corridor, 14 artists and a local middle school, North Hollywood Community Redevelopment Agency, CA
- 1991 Maryland State Arts Council, Fellowship, New Genres
- 1990 Mid-Atlantic Arts Foundation, Artist in Residence Grant
- 1989–90 Commission, Mayor's Advisory Committee on Art and Culture, Baltimore, MD
- 1988–89 Ford Foundation Fellowship
- 1987 Listed in Outstanding Young Men of America
- 1983 National Endowment for the Arts, Urban Studies Fellow
- 1982 National Endowment for the Arts, Conceptual Art, Fellowship C.A.P.S., Multi-Media Fellowship
- 1976 American Music Fellow, Salzburg Seminar, Austria
- 1975 Thomas J. Watson Fellowship Academy of American Poets Award
