= Rigoberto Torres =

Puerto Rican sculptor

- Born: 1960 (age 65–66); Aguadilla, Puerto Rico

Rigoberto Torres (born 1960) is a sculptor who was born in Aguadilla, Puerto Rico and worked in New York City, before moving to Florida where he currently lives and works. Torres began working in a factory where religious figures were cast, producing religious statuary. He also considers himself to be a community based artist.

== Sculptures ==
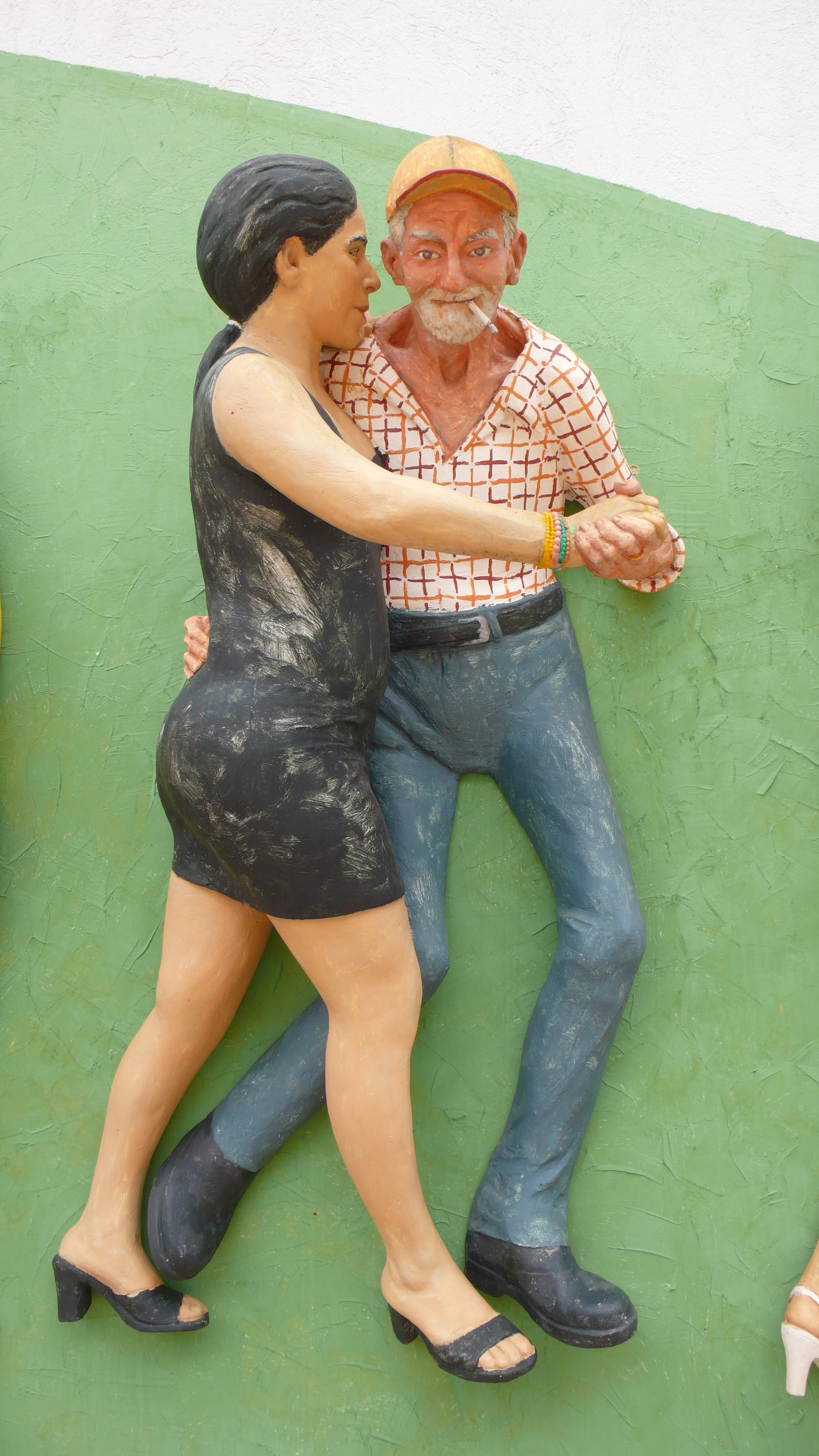
Centro de Arte Contemporânea Inhotim, Brumadinho, Brazil

Torres is known in part for the sculptures in plaster and fiberglass that he created of his neighbors in the Bronx, together with his partner John Ahearn. Between the years 1981 and 1985, they collaborated on four murals. These were We Are Family, Life on Dawson Street, Double Dutch, and Back to School. The mural Double Dutch (1981/2010), for example, was acquired by the Pérez Art Museum Miami, city in which Torres lives. The sculptures, like much of Torres' work, were displayed in public attached to buildings, free standing and in street events as an element of performance art. On many occasions, Torres would prompt Ahearn to move their studio to the sidewalk along Walton Avenue so that neighborhood children could watch and also volunteer as subjects.

Torres' sculptures show an instinctive drive to create tableaux from single figures and are included in the field of humanistic naturalism because they accurately portray people. He met frequent collaborator Ahearn in 1980, when Torres was working in a factory casting religious statues. They worked together on the Bronx sculptures, sometimes known as the South Bronx Hall of Fame, creating monuments to ordinary people as a response to the practice of enshrining famous, heroic figures in public places.

== Public Art ==
=== The Bronx ===
Rigoberto and John have sculpture installed on the exterior walls of buildings throughout The Bronx.

- "Double Dutch," 1981-2 is located on Kelly Street and Intervale Ave.
- "Life on Dawson St.," 1981-82 on Longwood Ave and Dawson St.
- "We Are Family" is on Southern Blvd. facing 156th St.
- There are also other casts installed outside The POINT Community Development Corporation at 940 Garrison Ave.

== Biography ==
Torres was born in Aguadilla, Puerto Rico, in 1960. At age four, he moved to New York, first in upper Manhattan and then to the Bronx.

In 1990 he returned to Puerto Rico where he produced twenty-two works over the course of a year, including Ruth Fernandez in 1991.
