= Mitch Corber =

New York City neo-Beat poet, an eccentric performance artist, and no wave videographer

Mitch Corber is a New York City neo-Beat poet, an eccentric performance artist, and no wave videographer known for his rapid whimsically comical montage and collage style. He has been associated with Collaborative Projects, Inc. (aka Colab), participated in Public Arts International/Free Speech and The Times Square Show, and is creator-director of cable TV long-running weekly series Poetry Thin Air in New York City and its on-line poetry/video archive. He has worked closely with ABC No Rio, Colab TV and the MWF Video Club and his audio art (often musique concrète collages) have been published on Tellus Audio Cassette Magazine three times. He is a recipient of a NY Foundation for the Arts Fellowship grant (1987) in the field of emerging artforms.

== Education, performance, and video history ==
Corber graduated from UCLA School of Theater, Film and Television in 1971 and shortly thereafter moved to New York City's Lower East Side, became influenced by the slide show performances and films of Jack Smith, and became an early member of Colab. Corber contributed to All Color News, Just Another Asshole and X Magazine.

During this period he became known as a performance artist with his Corber/Jolson Goes to Harlem performance. Riding the subway in blackface, Corber sang My Mammy crouched on one knee in true Al Jolson style. Lines include, "I'd walk a million miles For one of your smiles, My Mammy!"

He also appeared in James Nares's 1978 well-known no wave 82-minute color Super-8 film entitled Rome 78. The narrative is about the Roman emperor Caligula now set in a shabby 1978 downtown Manhattan apartment. As such, it proposes an analogy between ancient Rome and modern America as cultural empires. Despite its large cast in period costumes, the work is never made out to be a serious undertaking, with actors who interject scenes with self-conscious laughter, and deliver seemingly improvised lines with over the top bravado.

In 1988 Corber conducted a taped interview with Leonard Cohen that was purchased by the New York Public Library for its collection. He also produced a documentary on the New York Microtonal music group that was founded by Johnny Reinhard.

Corber is an awardee of a New York Foundation for the Arts grant as producer of Poetry Thin Air Cable Show and for founding the Thin Air Video Poetry DVD Archives: which includes material on Allen Ginsberg, Gregory Corso, John Ashbery, Diane di Prima, and John Cage.

He has created a DVD called John Cage: Man and Myth (1990) with appearances by David Antin, Glenn Branca, Jackson Mac Low and others. On August 24, 2006, Corber presented Cage Live Mix: Four Hours and 33 Minutes at A Gathering of the Tribes, impresario Steve Cannon's legendary venue. It was a multi-screen, multi-speaker, multi-room, ambient music mix of John Cage: Man and Myth material, that included video, audio, interview, poetry and various inserts, some chance-oriented with some audience participation. The title Four Hours and 33 Minutes refers to Cage's notorious silent piano sonata 4′33″. Spread through different areas of Tribes Gallery, it was, said the artist, "an opportunity for chance events and audience participation." The program included interview sequences with Cage and the many avant-garde artists who contributed homage interviews, including David Antin, Philip Glass, Richard Kostelanetz, Jackson Mac Low, Alison Knowles, Allen Kaprow, pianist Grete Sultan, Marjorie Perloff, and microtonalist Johnny Reinhard. In 2015, Corber created a short documentary video called Ludlow Street with Clayton that features Clayton Patterson walking down the street, discussing its cultural demise due to gentrification.

== Poetry history ==
Corber is the author of the poetry collections Weather's Feather and Quinine. Since the early 1980s Corber has read his poetry throughout New York City. His poems have appeared in Columbia Poetry Review, Vanitas, Nedge, Mirage, BlazeVOX, Blackbox Manifold 4, Listenlight, Polarity and tight.

He resides in East Village, Manhattan.
