= Peter Fend =

American artist

Peter Fend is an American artist born in 1950. In 1980, he founded Offices and the Ocean Earth Construction and Development Corporation with Colen Fitzgibbon, Jenny Holzer, Peter Nadin, Richard Prince, and Robin Winters, which was a "corporation" invented for a group of artists. In 1994, the organization changed its name to Ocean Earth Development Corporation (OCEAN EARTH).

== Work ==
The Offices and the Ocean Earth Construction and Development Corporation firm has come to be a vehicle for gathering authoritative evidence, such as detailed maps and satellite images, for what is described in the 1989 scientific conference Global Monitoring and Assessments: Towards the 21st Century as "ocean-basin monitoring and management." Precise maps mosaiced from aeronautical charts have been produced to include what UNEP documents call "land-based sources of pollution", or all possible terrain for drainage, for each regional sea. This would include, as shown in Documenta in 1992, the Black Sea, Baltic Sea, North Sea, and both the entire Mediterranean Sea and subsets thereof, like the Adriatic. The practice of basin mapping has been continued with bays, relying on an Irish law from 1959 defining "hydrometric areas" as any drainage basin for a bay including all bay waters extending out six miles beyond the outermost points of the bay. Such detailed hydrometric-area mapping has been conducted for the British Isles, New Zealand, Italy, parts of the Eastern Europe and both North and South America.

Plans for the Adriatic Basin were presented in the Venice Biennale Aperto of 1993, under the label "Oil-Free Corridor." These were pursued further with "On Board", in the 1995 Biennial, curated by Jerome Sans with action in the Venice Lagoon. Specifics were presented in the Architecture Biennail of 2008. In 2000, he was part of the three person show Ecologies at the Smart Museum of Art in Chicago with Mark Dion and Dan Peterman. Each artist "explored interrelationships between organisms and their surrounding" and Fend's featured work was titled China Basin Plans: The River Dragon Breathes Fire.

== Bibliography (selection) ==
- "Kunst im Weltmaßstab“. Thomas Bauer, Henning Christiansen, Joseph Beuys, Peter Fend, Gloria Friedmann, Ingo Günther, Ingold Airlines, Irwin, Paul Isenrath, Kazuo Katase, Raffael Rheinsberg, Kunsthalle Kiel, published by Hans-Werner Schmidt, 1993, ISBN 3-923701-61-6.
- "Ocean Earth 1980 bis heute.“ Peter Fend, Neue Galerie am Landesmuseum Joanneum, Graz, in collaboration with K-Raum Daxer, Munich, Oktagon-Verlag, Stuttgart, herausgegeben von Peter Weibel with Thomas Donga, Heike Tekampe und Peter Fend, 1994, ISBN 3-927789-72-0.
- "AFRICA-ARCTIC FLYWAY PHYSIOCRATIC STATES.“ Peter Fend with a foreword by Eve Vaterlaus and Joan Waltemath, Sternberg Press, Berlin, edited by Elisa R. Linn and Lennart Wolff, 2022, ISBN 978-3-95679-632-6.

== Reviews ==
The New York Times has called his work "A blend of Conceptual art, activism and entrepreneurship, it proposed tackling environmental problems through an application of art-as-design."
