= Just Another Asshole =

American mixed media project (1978 -1987)

Just Another Asshole was a no wave mixed media publication project launched from the Lower East Side of Manhattan from 1978 to 1987. Barbara Ess organized and edited seven issues of Just Another Asshole, which formed thanks to an open, collaborative submission process. Issues 3 and 4 were co-edited by Jane M. Sherry and issues 5 through 7 were co-edited by Glenn Branca. Issue formats include: zine, LP record, large format tabloid, magazine, exhibition catalog, and paperback book.

== Just Another Asshole #1 and #2: The Zines ==
Barbara Ess edited the first two installments of Just Another Asshole alone; these photocopied zines utilized intermingling high contrast compositions of apocalyptic warnings, celebrity close-ups, helicopters, and tabloids. The title for these works came from the first zine, which contains an alarming juxtaposition of the image of a deaf boy killed by an attack that he could not hear alongside the handwritten words just another asshole, a coupling which drops both cynical subjectivity and objectivity in the viewer's lap. The materiality of the zines, taped together with electrical tape and overlaid with red writing, heightened the boldness of the aesthetic.

== Just Another Asshole #3: Tabloid Format Magazine ==
This issue was co-edited by Jane M. Sherry and was born out of an open call for work, where anything would be accepted for publication. The final product included contributions from Jenny Holzer, Barbara Kruger, Carla Liss and as many as forty others.

== Just Another Asshole #4: Artforum Catalog Spread ==
The fourth installment of this project lived as a four-page spread included in the February 1980 issue of Artforum.

== Just Another Asshole #5: The LP ==
Just Another Asshole 1981 LP cover

Just Another Asshole #5 (1981) was a compilation anthology LP of 84 artists' and musicians' work. The LP was released with the help of White Columns. Only two of the tracks are longer than a minute. A CD reissue was released in 1995 on Atavistic Records.

=== Track listing ===
1. Larry Simon – "Eggs Benedictus" – 0:52
2. Dara Birnbaum – "Kojak/Wang" – 0:56
3. Carla Liss – Untitled – 0:52
4. Bobby G – excerpt from "Times Sq. Show Audio" – 0:38
5. Wharton Tiers – "Incantation" – 0:48
6. Carol Parkinson – "True Confessions" – 0:53
7. Nina Canal – untitled – 0:50
8. Lee Ranaldo – "Shift" – 0:45
9. Jenny Holzer – untitled – 0:46
10. Annea Lockwood – "Sound Stroke" – 0:56
11. Michael Smith / A. Leroy – "The Smith-Leroy Comedy Team" – 0:45
12. Chris Nelson – "Dinner Time" – 0:48
13. Willie Klein – untitled – 0:48
14. Mitch Corber – "Simply Riding a Dream" – 0:52
15. Mark Abott – untitled – 0:53
16. Dan Graham – untitled – 0:42
17. Michael Shamberg – "On the Promontory" – 0:47
18. Anne DeMarinis – "Radio Song" – 0:46
19. Thurston Moore – "The Fucking Youth of Today" – 0:50
20. Andy Blinx / Don Hünerberg – "Red Ants" – 0:47
21. Vikky Alexander – "Calvin Klein" – 0:27
22. John Howell – "Dear John" – 0:53
23. Salvatore Principato – untitled – 0:50
24. Nigel Rollings – "Penumbra" – 0:40
25. Peggy Katz – "Grand Central Station" – 0:42
26. Eric Bogosian – "Highway Patrol" – 0:43
27. Herr Lugus – "Happy Police Horn" – 0:43
28. Amy Taubin – "Door Stop" – 0:46
29. Remko Scha – excerpt from "The Machines" – 0:53
30. Susan Russell – "Talking Art" – 0:34
31. Bill Buchen – untitled – 0:45
32. Verge Piersol – "Well, Alice" – 0:43
33. David Hofstra / Lynne Tillman – "Tell the Story" – 0:49
34. D. Brown – "K-4" – 0:42
35. Sandra Seymour – "Dogs" – 0:45
36. Phill Niblock – "Index Circa Seventy" – 0:46
37. Barbara Kruger – "United Technology" – 0:51
38. John Rehberger – "Fetish" – 0:51
39. Paul McMahon / Nancy Radloff – "Turtles Travel Slower on Asphalt" – 0:45
40. Bruce Tovsky – "Dub Bums" – 0:46
41. Martha Wilson – untitled – 0:19
42. Ned Sublette – excerpt from "Slowly I Turn, Step By Step, Inch By Inch ...." – 0:41
43. Glenn Branca – "Faspeedelaybop" – 1:01
44. Gail Vachon – "You Will Start Out Standing" – 0:47
45. B. Conan Piersol – "Deutschland Etude" – 0:47
46. Gregory Sandow – "A Natural Death" – 0:43
47. Stephan Wischerth – "Dirty Tape" – 1:04
48. Bob George – "Warhead in the Forehead" – 0:48
49. Judy Rifka – It's True" – 0:44
50. David Garland – "Long Song" – 0:45
51. Mark Bingham – "32 Bad Movies" – 0:41
52. Michael Byron – excerpt from "Strangers in a Strange Land" – 0:48
53. Glenda Hydler / Susan Fisher – "It's Hot Love" – 0:46
54. Laurie Spiegel – untitled – 0:51
55. Barbara Ess – "Entrada" – 0:50
56. Kiki Smith – untitled – 0:44
57. Shelley Hirsch – untitled – 0:45
58. Peter Gordon – "Foreign Waters" – 0:46
59. Arleen Schloss – "Watch Out - Verse 5" – 0:51
60. Tod Jorgensen – "Sweden - Den Mother" – 0:47
61. David Rosenbloom – "Voices and Chambers" – 0:47
62. Doug Snyder – untitled – 0:45
63. Jon Rubin – "Floating Cinema Excerpt" – 0:42"
64. Thomas Lawson – untitled – 0:45
65. Harry Spitz – "Pipe Music" – 0:46
66. Rhys Chatham / David Linton – excerpt from "64 Short Stories" – 0:55
67. Isa Genzken – "Salutations Roma" – 0:48
68. Daile Kaplan – "New Sneakers" – 0:25
69. Kim Gordon and Miranda – "Working Youth" – 0:50
70. Sally A. White – untitled – 0:50
71. Joseph Nechvatal – "Crown of Thorns" – 0:46
72. Steven Harvey – "Friend Heart Alarm" – 0:49
73. Sammy Marshall Harvey – "Radio Off" – 0:35
74. Brian Doherty – untitled – 0:51
75. Rudolph Grey – "Evelyn McHale" – 0:45
76. Richard Morrison – "Die" – 0:46
77. Z'EV – excerpt from "Metal and Plastic" – 0:54

== Just Another Asshole #6: The Book ==
Just Another Asshole book cover

Anthologies played a major part in defining the various attitudes of downtown no wave work. Just Another Asshole #6 is often cited as one of these seminal writing compilations. Edited with Glenn Branca, the sixth issue of this downtown magazine outlines the variety of styles and aesthetics that were developing in the early 1980s. Included in the issue are works by Kathy Acker, Aline Mare, Eric Bogosian, Mitch Corber, Brian Buczak, Jenny Holzer, Cookie Mueller, Richard Prince, Joseph Nechvatal, Judy Rifka, David Rattray, Arleen Schloss, Kiki Smith, Tod Jorgenson, Lynne Tillman, Anne Turyn, Ann Rower, Reese Williams, David Wojnarowicz, Barbara Kruger, and others.

== Just Another Asshole #7: Thought Objects ==
This final installment of the Just Another Asshole project was co-edited by Glenn Branca and published in 1987. This publication includes photographs by Alice Albert and others as well as essays by Rosetta Brooks, Tricia Collins & Richard Milazzo, John Hilliard, Gary Indiana, Cookie Mueller, David Grey Rattray, Carol Squiers, Amy Taubin, and Lynne Tillman.
