= New York Film Festival Downtown =

Film festival, 1984–1988

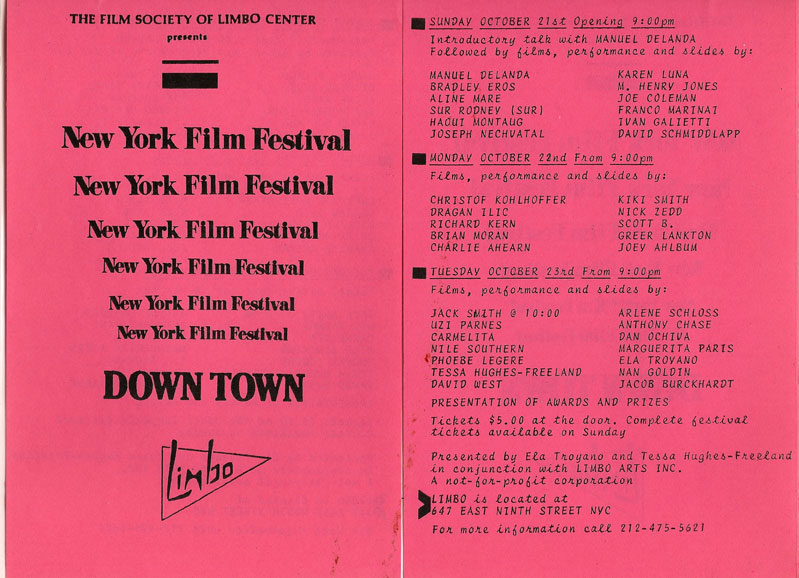
- First program for the New York Film Festival Downtown held during October 1984 at the Limbo Lounge
- Location: New York City, United States
- Established: October 1984
- Founded by: Tessa Hughes-Freeland, Ela Troyano
- Disestablished: 1988

New York Film Festival Downtown was a New York-based film festival founded by Tessa Hughes-Freeland and Ela Troyano in 1984. With independent and "positively avante-garde" programming, it came to prominence in the East Village art scene and ran for five years, ending in 1988.

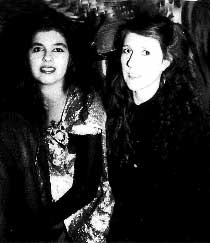
Festival directors Ela Troyano (left) and Tessa Hughes-Freeland at 8BC for the 1985 New York Film Festival Downtown

== 1984 ==
- Judgment Day (Directed by: Manuel DeLanda)
- Between Two Fires (Directed by: Bradley Eros)
- Blind Love (Directed by: Aline Mare)
- Bargain Slide Show (Directed by: David Schmiddlapp)
- Confidential (Directed by: Joseph Nechvatal)
- Bored (Directed by: Karen Luna)
- Chant Chant Amour Amour (Directed by: Haoui Montaug)
- Sur Reel Selections (Directed by: Sur Rodney (Sur))
- Soul City (Directed by: M. Henry Jones)
- Go go girl (Directed by: M. Henry Jones)
- Someplace in Nowhere (Directed by: Joe Coleman)
- Home Move of Warhol Shooting Unreleased Movie (Directed by: Taylor Mead)
- Blue Pleasure (Directed by: FrAnco Marinai)
- David Crocker as Venus (Directed by: Ela Troyano)
- Pompeii: New York Pt. 1: Pier Caresses (Directed by: Ivan Galietti)
- Slides (Directed by: Christof Kohlhöfer)
- Electric Pencil Performance #13 (Directed by: Dragan Ilic)
- Show of Force - Blood Boy (Directed by: Richard Kern and Brian Moran)
- No Guilt (Directed by: Nick Zedd)
- Contortionist (Directed by: Greer Lankton)
- Bandits (Directed by: Joey Ahlbum)
- Invasion of the Amazons (Continued Erosion) (Directed by: Penelope Wehrli)
- Joker (Directed by: Tessa Hughes-Freeland)
- August 13th 1961 (Directed by: Kiki Smith)
- City Maze (Directed by: Jane Dickson)
- The Specialist (Directed by: Scott B)
- The Deadly Art of Survival (Directed by: Charlie Ahearn)
- Not Quite Love (Directed by: David Schmiddlapp)
- The Ballad of Sexual Dependency (Directed by: Nan Goldin)
- Exotic Landlordism of Crab Lagoon (Directed by: Jack Smith)
- Dagmar Poisoned the Pizza (Directed by: Anthony Chase)
- Teddy Foot Beach Grov. (Directed by: Nile Southern and Phoebe Legere)
- Priapic Violations (Directed by: Uzi Peres with Carmelita Tropicana)
- Poppo at 8BC (Directed by: Tessa Hughes-Freeland)
- Portrait of Glenn Branca, Symphony #4 (Directed by: Arleen Schloss)
- Kate Mannheim and Jack Smith (Directed by: Dan Ochiva)
- A Walled City Documentary (Directed by: David West)
- Mares (Directed by: Alex Steyermark)
- Excerpts from Bubble People (Directed by: Ela Troyano)
- This Object (Directed by: Jacob Burckhardt)

== 1985 ==
- Slide Performance (Directed by: Stephen Holman and Torture Chorus)
- The Ballad of Sexual Dependency (Directed by: Nan Goldin)
- Pyrotechnics (Directed by: Erotic Psyche (Aline Mare & Bradley Eros))
- The Outsiders (Directed by: Dan Ochiva)
- Fall In A Faint (Directed by: Sokhi Wagner)
- Last Nights (Directed by: Sandy Tate and Gretchen Bender)
- Spectre Woman - On the Road (Directed by: Ellen Fisher, Mary Schultz, Tone Blevins and John Van Wagner)
- Work At Nine (Directed by: Julius Klein)
- Frankie Teardrop (Directed by: Edit DeAk and Walter Robinson)
- Spills & Thrills (Directed by: Sur Rodney Sur)
- The Agent (Directed by: Mary Bellis)
- A La Vueltecita (Directed by: Ileana Maria Montalvo)
- The Day Koch gets Electrocuted (Directed by: David Schmidlapp)
- Dead On My Arm (Directed by: Casandra Stark)
- Worm Movie (Directed by: Lung Leg)
- Slight Show (Directed by: Christof Kohlhofer)
- Simonland (Directed by: Tommy Turner)
- Live Ammo (Directed by: Terry Stacey)
- Chett Grant: A Portrait of the Man (Directed by: Fabio P. Roberti for DirectArt Productions Ltd.)
- Thrust In Me (Directed by: Nick Zedd and Richard Kern)
- Submit To Me or From Sex to Death (Directed by: Richard Kern)
- Manhattan Love Suicides (Directed by: Richard Kern)
- Tender HB1 (Directed by: Dragan Ilic)
- It Don't Pay To Be An Honest Citizen (Directed by: Jacob Burckhardt)
- Pompeii New York, Part 1 (Directed by: Ivan Galietti)
- Asparagus (Directed by: Suzan Pitt)
- Excerpts From Apple, Heart, Daisy Film (Directed by: M. Henry Jones and Susan Tremblay)
- Henry VIII (Directed by: Susan Tremblay)
- Ism Ism (Directed by: Manuel De Landa)
- Cyanide Time (Directed by: David West)
- White Rabbit (Directed by: Andy Somma)
- MasterRay (Directed by: Ruby Ray)
- Loisada Lusts (Directed by: Uzi Peres and Ela Troyano)
- Stars & Stripes (Directed by: Uzi Peres and Ela Troyano)
- Revenge of the Dearest (Directed by: Anthony Chase)
- Rhonda Goes To Hollywood (Directed by: Tessa Hughes-Freeland)
- Mime 2 Mind (Directed by: Arleen Schloss)
- Voyage To The Wall (Directed by: Johan Donner and Ulf Nilsson)
- Rome '78 (Directed by: James Nares)

== 1986 ==
- A Presentation of 3D slides (Directed by: M. Henry Jones)
- Parade (Directed by: Joey Ahlbum)
- C'est la Guerre (Directed by: Karen Mandelbaum)
- Alive With Pleasure (Directed by: Anthony Chase and the Avenue A Ladies' Auxiliary)
- Demeter & Persephone (Directed by: Leslie Lowe)
- Witness Chamber (Directed by: Ruby Ray)
- 8D (Directed by: Nile Southern)
- White Rabbit (Directed by: Andy Soma)
- Monsieur Albet's Kaleidoscope EROTICON (Directed by: Stephen Holman)
- Corrective Measures: Politically Speaking (Directed by: Peter Cramer)
- Titere (Directed by: Ileana Montalvo)
- Bath House (Directed by: Ira Abromowitz)
- I Ride a Pony Named Flame (Directed by: Peggy Ahwesh)
- Performance (Directed by: Julius Klein)
- A Suicide (Directed by: Richard Klemann)
- Vampire Terror Party (Directed by: David Wicked)
- Memorias De La Revolucion (Performance) (Directed by: Carmelita Tropicana)
- The Black Monster (Directed by: Lung Leg)
- Bad Blood for the Vampyr (Directed by: Lis-san Tibodo)
- Coney Island (Directed by: Max Henry)
- Parental Guidance Suggested (Performance) (Directed by: Amy Turner and Tommy Turner)
- You Killed Me First (Directed by: Richard Kern)
- Submit To Me (Directed by: Richard Kern)
- Go To Hell (Directed by: Nick Zedd)
- Kiss Me Goodbye (Directed by: Nick Zedd)
- Human Waste (Directed by: Mark Zero)
- The Deal (Directed by: Mad Max)
- Pus (Directed by: John Spencer)
- a place to beware (Directed by: David Schmidlapp)
- Mild Seven: Cowboy Stories (Directed by: Kembra Pfahler)
- Good Luvin' Guitar Man (Directed by: Direct Art Ltd.)
- Heterosexual Love (Directed by: Direct Art Ltd.)
- The Wages of Sin (Directed by: David Rutsala)
- Devil's In The Dish (Directed by: Jo Andres)
- The Girls Can't Help It (Directed by: Uzi Peres)
- Police Sexuality (Directed by: Manuel DeLanda)
- Black Cat Tea (Directed by: Marzy Quazar)
- Pure War (part two of Amor Amore) (Directed by: Erotic Psyche)
- Where Evil Dwells (Directed by: Tommy Turner and David Wojnarowicz)
- Rat Trap (Directed by: Tessa Hughes-Freeland and Tommy Turner)
- Wrecked on Cannibal Island (Directed by: Cassandra Stark)
- Dumb Blond (Directed by: Ela Troyano)
- Stone Age Lament (Directed by: Tony Caplan)
- Tattoo Suite (Directed by: R.S. Wolkstein)
- Fantasmagoria (Directed by: Richard Bruce Byron)

== 1987 ==
- Elusive Butterfly (Directed by: Andy Soma)
- Dancenoise with Anthony Chase (Directed by: Dancenoise and Anthony Chase)
- Catwalk (Directed by: Sue Graef)
- Memento Mori (Directed by: Michael Brynntrup)
- Pending (Directed by: Alyson Mead)
- Rush (Directed by: Mary Patierno and Mo Angelus)
- Butter Film (Directed by: Kiki Smith)
- Un Pas Deux (Directed by: Cassandra Stark and Haldor Enard)
- You'll Get Yours (Directed by: Jonathan Quinn)
- Electramorphic (Directed by: Erotic Psyche)
- Whipoorwill, Whip-or-will, Whip-poor-will (Directed by: Carl George)
- The Escape (Directed by: Philly)
- Siegfried (Directed by: Jack Waters)
- Untitled (Directed by: Cheryl Dyer)
- The Invasion of Thunderbolt Pagoda (Directed by: Ira Cohen)
- Shadows (Directed by: Brad Taylor)
- Moxie (Directed by: Adrienne Altenhaus)
- Pay To Live (Directed by: Richard Klemann)
- Police State (Directed by: Nick Zedd)
- Bloodlust (Directed by: Michael Gabriele and Ghislaine Chantel Jourden)
- Astroturf (Directed by: Jourdan Schwartze and David Markey)
- Fingered (Directed by: Richard Kern)
- Death Valley '69 (Directed by: Richard Kern)
- Film/Performance (Directed by: Julius Klein)
- Marilyn (Directed by: Nile Southern)
- The Doorman (Directed by: Dee D. Bache)
- Berlin New York (Directed by: Penelope Wehrli)
- Getting Over Getting Over (Directed by: David Schmidlapp)
- Coney Island (Directed by: Peter Cramer)
- Fifth, Park and Madison (Directed by: Dragan Ilic)
- A presentation of 3D slides (Directed by: M. Henry Jones, Joey Ahlbum and Robert Munn)
- Nocturnes (Directed by: Leslie Lowe and Jack Waters)
- Film Performance (Directed by: Ellen Fisher)
- Perils (Directed by: Abigail Child)
- Bali 1930's (Directed by: Suzanne Pillsbury)
- A-B-City (Directed by: Dieter Hormel and Brigitte Buhler)
- Der Elvis (Directed by: Jon Moritsugu)
- Maneaters (Directed by: Uzi Peres)
- Fire in my Belly (Directed by: David Wojnarowicz)
- Or Beautiful People (Directed by: David Wojnarowicz)
- Hollow Be Thy Name (working title) (Directed by: Tommy Turner)
- Craftmatic Dreamin (Directed by: Kembra Pfahler)
- Going Jane (Directed by: Tessa Hughes-Freeland)
- Blonde Voodoo (Directed by: Ela Troyano)

== 1988 ==
- Flag (Directed by: Jonathan Quinn)
- Go-Go Girls (Directed by: M.Henry Jones and Joey Ahlbum)
- Pachanga En Dos Medios (Directed by: Marian Soto)
- The Circle Game (Directed by: Andy Soma)
- Hollow Be Thy Name (Directed by: Tommy Turner)
- Son of Craftmatic Dreamin' 1988 Sequel (Directed by: Kembra Pfahler)
- Untitled (Directed by: Anthony Chase)
- Spectre Woman Chronicles- Involuntary Possession (Directed by: Spectre Woman)
- Trash/Mull (Directed by: Lisa Lacquer)
- Candela (Directed by: Carmelita Tropicana, Uzi Peres and Ela Troyano)
- Betaville (Directed by: Alyce Wittenstein)
- Café Notre Y Sur (Directed by: Maria Victoria Maldonado)
- Family Jewels (Directed by: Leslie Lowe and Jack Waters)
- The Golden Bowl or Repression (Directed by: Chris Krauss)
- Wishes (Directed by: Alessandra Bergero)
- Welcome To The Jungle (Directed by: Mark Zero)
- Which Turn? (Directed by: Sandy Tait)
- Bloodbath (Directed by: Ghislaine Jourden)
- Submit To Me Now (Directed by: Richard Kern)
- Film from performance piece Lucid Possession (Directed by: Jo Andres)
- Maneaters 3 - Squalid Salad (Directed by: Uzi Peres)
- Sleazy Rider (Directed by: Jon Moritsugu)
- Exploding Limo Show (Directed by: Nile Southern)
- Untitled (Directed by: Steve Gallagher)
- What I did this Summer (Directed by: John Whitehead)
- Plastered (Directed by: Lorraine Llamas)
- Frannie (Directed by: Adrienne Altenhaus)
- Mayhem (Directed by: Abigail Child)
- 900 Pounds (Directed by: Alan Abrams)
- Apartment Eight (Directed by: Matthew Harrison)
- Politics of Deed (Directed by: Cheryl Dyer)
- Perry (Directed by: Cheryl Dyer)
