= Manhattan Love Suicides (film) =

1985 film series

- Directed by: Richard Kern
- Written by: Richard Kern
- Produced by: Richard Kern
- Starring: Bill Rice; David Wojnarowicz; Nick Zedd; Tommy Turner; Amy Turner
- Music by: JG Thirlwell; Wiseblood; The Dream Syndicate
- Release date: 1985
- Running time: 35 minutes
- Country: United States
- Language: English

The Manhattan Love Suicides is a 1985 American underground comedy film series written, produced and directed by Richard Kern. It consists of four short films: Stray Dogs, Woman at the Wheel, Thrust in Me, and I Hate You Now.

Shot in Manhattan's Lower East Side in the mid-1980s, a turbulent time when the HIV/AIDS epidemic was at its height, and poverty, crime, violence, prostitution and drug consumption were running rampant in New York City, Kern's anthology film is a part of the Cinema of Transgression movement (a term coined by Nick Zedd who also appears in the Woman at the Wheel and Thrust in Me segments). It was shot in Super 8mm film.

The UK-based rock band The Manhattan Love Suicides took its name from the film.

== Synopsis ==
=== Stray Dogs ===
A love-sick fan stalks an artist and when he’s refused attention, he literally comes apart.

=== Woman at the Wheel ===
A woman takes each of her boyfriends —one poor and one rich— for a drive in her new car. Each argues with her and insists on taking the wheel. She beats one of them up, before crashing into a group of youths and, finally, a wall.

=== Thrust in Me ===
A woman reads Suicide, by French sociologist Émile Durkheim, and contemplates slitting her wrists in her NY apartment. Her boyfriend returns home to find her corpse in the bathtub and takes his sexual pleasure from it. Filmmaker Nick Zedd plays both the female and the male lead roles.

=== I Hate You Now ===
A drug peddler and his girlfriend severely disfigure themselves out of love and betrayal.

== Cast ==
"Stray Dogs"

- Bill Rice as The Artist
- David Wojnarowicz as Mad Fan
- Robin Renzi

"Woman at the Wheel"

- Adrienne Altenhaus
- Nick Zedd
- Gary Ray

"Thrust in Me"

- Nick Zedd
- Don Houston as Pimp

"I Hate You Now"

- Tommy Turner as Peddler
- Amy Turner as Peddler's girlfriend

== Background ==
Similarly to other New York underground films of the Reagan era, Manhattan Love Suicides is deliberately seeking to outrage and violate morals and sensibilities, as well as to break boundaries. The film also clearly pays tribute to earlier revolutionary filmmakers, such as Kenneth Anger, Paul Morrissey, Andy Warhol and John Waters.

Richard Kern has admitted in interviews that during the time he was filming Manhattan Love Suicides he was using heroin and other drugs. He and his films are prominently mentioned in Jack Sargeant's book Deathtripping: The Cinema of Transgression (1995).

Performance artist and activist David Wojnarowicz, who is featured in the first segment of the anthology, died of AIDS seven years after the film was released.

Between December 1, 2017, and March 26, 2018, Manhattan Love Suicides was screened at the MoMA as part of the "New York Film and Video: No Wave–Transgressive" survey on New York's post-punk period.
