= Gordon Kurtti =

New York City theatrical writer and performer

Gordon Stokes Kurtti
- Born: May 4, 1960; Yonkers, New York
- Died: April 18, 1987 (aged 26)
- Occupations: artist, writer, illustrator and performer
- Known for: East Village art scene

Gordon Stokes Kurtti (May 4, 1960 - April 18, 1987) was an American artist, writer, illustrator and performer. He was a seminal figure in the early East Village art scene of New York City's Lower East Side.

Kurtti's output – his crossing of visual art with literature, performance, and cinema – along with his connection to and activity within the nightclub milieu of the post punk "downtown" culture of New York City in the 1980s, when culture merged with entertainment – is illustrative of the period.

Kurtti was a member of Allied Productions, a not-for-profit arts organization based in New York City. With Allied's collective umbrella as a resource and guide for social and aesthetic experimentation, he collaborated on performances, films and Arts in education workshops. Though his life was brief his output was relatively prolific - like many figures in this history of the fervent, feverish climate of New York City's Lower East Side in the '80s. He exhibited at ABC No Rio, Club Armageddon, Pyramid Club, 8BC and Life Café – the East Village hangout featured in Rent.

== Background ==
Kurtti was one of seven children born to Claire Marie Kurtti (née Stokes) and Jeremiah Joseph Kurtti in Yonkers, New York. He was shy and somewhat introverted but known for his love of reading and early artistic abilities. Gordon had a vivid imagination and an affinity for comic book art, monster movies and outer space. He grew up drawing elaborate spaceships complete with flight instructions and statistics. He admired and drew mythical heroes like Prince Valiant and was inspired by the first existentialist, Hamlet. He graduated from Yonkers Preparatory High School and was accepted into New York's School Of Visual Arts at a time when alumni such as Keith Haring were exploding onto the downtown New York scene. There he met and formed a lifelong friendship and artistic collaboration with classmate Kembra Pfahler.

== Career ==
Kurtti collaborated on various art projects with many of his peers placing him within the circle of second generation of co-directors at Abc No Rio that included Jack Waters, Peter Cramer, and Carl George, and Colab predecessors Bradley Eros and Aline Mare - then performing as the partnership Erotic Psyche. This circle also included the artists Valerie Caris, Leslie Lowe, Brad Taylor, Leslie Lowe, Richard Hofmann, and Tony Pinotti among others. With this grouping Kurtti frequently performed and presented his work at the Pyramid Club and Danceteria. In 1984 Pfahler and Kurtti organized The Extremist Show at ABC No Rio . This was a watershed exhibition that coincided with the introduction of many of New York's sub-culture artists and groups. Included in the Extremist Show curation was the resident dance company of the Pyramid Club P.O.O.L., The performance series Church of the Little Green Man, The Cinema of Transgression featuring the films of Nick Zedd, Lydia Lunch and Richard Kern, Borbetomagus and Redtape Magazine. Kurtti was influenced by all of these, and he in turn contributed to their impact through his creative activities and his presence in their fomentation.

== Fashion ==
After art school he began training as an illustrator for advertisers and the fashion industry for burgeoning designer Diane Pernet and worked in the art department of The Limited Company. He collaborated with Carl George on a showroom design for Yumi Katsura, Japan's pre-eminent wedding gown designer and again collaborated on the fashion show launch event featuring a young Brooke Shields. Kurtti designed the stage and room decor one of the first AIDS fund-raising events for the Henry Grethel menswear line in 1986.

== Theater ==
Gordon worked with theatrical producer Liz Dunn to create °∞One Night Stands°± at La Mama Cabaret in Ellen Stewart's legendary La MaMa Experimental Theatre Club. He adopted the pseudonym Sketch Louis for his on site illustrations capturing performers like Hapi Phace, Edgar Oliver, Lypsinka (AKA John Epperson), Samoa, the theater group Watchface, Taboo! (AKA Stephen Tashjian), Kimberly Flynn among others. Kurtti also drew a spot-on caricature of Sam Shepard for the 1984 La Mama presentation of Shepard Sets, a series of three short plays: Suicide in B Flat, Angel City and Black Bog Beast. Kurtti proved himself to be a master of realist drawing with a wry sense of humor. Kurtti created and performed his work The Bearded Bride in the 1985 production Foho Tell Dreams at Danspace Project at Saint Mark's Church.

== Film ==
Gordon was an early collaborator on many experimental film works by Carl George, Jack Waters, Bradley Eros and Leslie Lowe and Brad and Brian Taylor. Like most of his art friends, he wore many hats from cameraman to set designer to lead actor. Sets often consisted of whatever was found on the street and easily painted, hung or reconfigured. Costumes were assembled from thrift shop racks, flea market finds or abandoned closets. The preferred medium was Super-8 film easily cut and edited on a kitchen table. Screenings were organized through Naked Eye Cinema, the media branch of Allied Productions and took place at The Film-Makers' Cooperative, Millennium Film Workshop, Anthology Film Archives, ABC No Rio, abandoned lots, alleys and nightclubs. Many of the films including The Lost 40 Days and La Belle Fleur and DHPG Mon Amour by Carl M. George and Nocturnes and The Blond Leading The Blond by Jack Waters now reside in the permanent collections of The New York Public Library, The Library of Congress, The Museum of Modern Art, NYC, and other important collections and archives.

The film and moving image works in which Kurtti appears and in whose production to which he principally contributed are in the collections of Anthology Film Archives, The Film Makers Cooperative, the Reserve Film and Video Collection of the New York Public Library for the Performing Arts and the Downtown Collection of New York University's Fales Library.

Kurti's life and work are the subject of an archival, preservation, and distribution project by Allied Productions, Inc.

== Filmography ==
- La Belle Fleur (Actor, Set/Prop Designer) dir. Carl M. George 1985
- Brains By Revlon (Co-Writer, Costume/Set Designer, Storyboard Artist) dir. Jack Waters 1986
- The Blond Leading The Blond [unproduced] (Co-Writer Costume/Set Designer, Storyboard Artist) dir. Jack Waters 1986
- The Lost 40 Days (Actor, Art Director, Set/Prop Designer) dir. Carl M. George 1986
- Whippoorwill (Art Director, Set/Prop Designer) dir. Carl M. George 1986
