= Tessa Hughes-Freeland =

British-born experimental filmmaker

- Occupations: Filmmaker, writer, curator
- Years active: 1982–present
- Spouse: Carlo McCormick (m. 1985)
- Website: tessahughesfreeland.com

Tessa Hughes-Freeland is a British-born experimental filmmaker, writer living in New York City. Her films have screened internationally in North America, Europe and Australia and in prominent museums and galleries, including the Museum of Modern Art (MOMA); the Museum of Contemporary Art, Los Angeles; the Whitney Museum of American Art; the New Museum of Contemporary Art in New York; and the KW Institute of Contemporary Art in Berlin. She has collaborated on live multi-media projects with musicians like John Zorn and J. G. Thirlwell.

Hughes-Freeland works in a variety of formats and mediums, and her films have been shown in diverse venues, ranging from internationally prominent museums to seedy bars in gritty neighborhoods. Her work frequently confronts conventional perceptions of reality in daring and sometimes provocative ways. Hughes-Freeland's website describes her work as "confrontational, transgressive, provocative and poetic". The critic Jack Sargeant wrote that Hughes-Freeland "approaches filmmaking in a multiplicity of styles, ranging from classic narrative to experimental 'performances' and even a documentary."

Hughes-Freeland was part of the No Wave Cinema movement that began in the mid-1970s on New York City's Lower East Side, which included Scott B and Beth B, Richard Kern, Nick Zedd, Jim Jarmusch, Tom DiCillo, Steve Buscemi, and Vincent Gallo. In the 1980s, this morphed into the Cinema of Transgression, in which she and other Lower East Side artists and filmmakers created no-budget films and art that contravened prevailing conventions of American society and challenged established, "correct" cultural norms.

== Early life and education ==
Hughes-Freeland earned a BA in Art History from University College London and an MA in Cinema Studies from New York University. Among the earliest admirers of her work were the controversial, celebrated late artist and activist David Wojnarowicz, who bought her a super 8 camera for her filmmaking, and the writer, critic and curator Carlo McCormick.

== Career ==
=== Film criticism and festival organizing ===
Hughes-Freeland wrote a stream of articles on the burgeoning No Wave underground film scene in the East Village, Manhattan in the early to mid-1980s in publications like PAPER Magazine, the East Village Eye and the Underground Film Bulletin. She also organized numerous film nights at local clubs and bars in lower Manhattan, like Danceteria and the Reel Club at Club 57, showings that culminated in the creation of the annual New York Film Festival Downtown in 1984. Together with Ela Troyano, Hughes-Freeland founded and ran the annual New York Film Festival Downtown from 1984–1990. Hughes-Freeland later served as President of the Board of Directors of The Film-Makers' Cooperative in New York City from 1998–2001. She has published articles in numerous books, including Jack Sargeant's 2008 Naked Lens: Beat Cinema and Kari-Lynn Winters's 2006 No Focus: Punk Film, and in periodicals including PAPER Magazine, Filmmaker magazine, GQ, the East Village Eye, and Film Threat.

=== Filmmaking ===
A prolific filmmaker, Hughes-Freeland often screened her own films in the 1980s at nightlife venues and in emerging East Village art galleries, such as her 1982 film, "Baby Doll," which documented the seedy urban demi-monde of strippers working at the Baby Doll Lounge in Tribeca in lower Manhattan. The Cinéma vérité soundtrack consists of real-life conversations between the go-go dancers, and the film devotes considerable footage to the dancers' feet. The Village Voice noted that Hughes-Freeland was one of about a dozen leading figures in New York's underground film movement, and described Baby Doll as depicting the "systemic misogyny destroying the go-go club scene in New York" in the 1980s.

Hughes-Freeland's 1985 film, "Rhonda Goes to Hollywood," a docufiction featuring the artist Rhonda Zwillinger, was exhibited as part of an installation in the Gracie Mansion Gallery in New York. In 1985 Hughes-Freeland's husband Carlo McCormick, who had just written a eulogy entitled "East Village R.I.P." that punctuated the decline of the early 1980s lower Manhattan cultural scene, was invited to curate a gallery exhibition in Richmond, Virginia. The show evolved into what became a weekend-long installation art show in which artists competed to create shocking murals on the gallery walls. Hughes-Freeland filmed the installation, which featured artists including Marilyn Minter, Luis Frangella, James Romberger, Marguerite Van Cook and Wojnarowicz. The management of the gallery, whose interior decoration included polished floors and stained glass windows, supplied the artists with beer and overnight accommodations, but was apparently unaware of the installation's transgressive nature. Some of the artists were allegedly using LSD and applying garish colours and shocking images straight onto the gallery walls. The separate scenes were joined together by profanities applied over the results and decorative additions by Frangella. Gallery management was later said to have been pleased to see the artists go.

In 1992 Hughes-Freeland worked in collaboration with Annabelle Davies to create a film called "Dirty" based on Georges Bataille's erotic novella Blue of Noon, whose plot touches upon controversial topics like incest and necrophilia. Primarily a filmmaker and writer, Hughes-Freeland has occasionally worked as an actor, appearing in the 1993 film "Red Spirit Lake," whose opening scene depicts sexual imagery and graphic horror, a scene in which Hughes-Freeland does not appear. The director of the movie, Charles Pinion, cast a number of people associated with the Cinema of Transgression movement like Richard Kern and Hughes-Freeland.

In the following year, she made Nymphomania, a film whose mythology-inspired plot depicts a wood nymph disrobing whilst a voyeuristic satyr pleasures himself, then forces himself upon the nymph, impaling her upon his barbed phallus. According to Variant.org, "It is all carried off with an understandably ironic humour. The film is an interesting development, focusing more on mythology than the contemporary. The return to unreconstructed Romanticism has been influential – Nymphomania is a precursor to the use of such imagery by art world favourite Matthew Barney."

=== Collaborative performances ===
Hughes-Freeland has worked collaboratively with musicians like John Zorn and J. G. Thirlwell on live multiple projections. One project with Zorn and Troyano, "Playboy Voodoo," was performed at the Whitney Museum of American Art as part of the 1996 "No Wave Cinema" exhibition. The following year, Hughes-Freeland presented an expanded cinema performance with Troyano for Zorn's composition "Elegy" as part of Zorn's Tzadik record label European tour. She and Troyano presented an expanded cinema performance with Zorn's "Godard" for Roulette TV in 2002.

=== Recognition and exhibitions ===
In 2001, Hughes-Freeland was named a Fellow of the New York Foundation for the Arts. She was one of a handful of filmmakers along with David Wojnarowicz, Richard Kern and others whose work was featured in "You Killed Me First: The Cinema of Transgression," a significant show in 2012 at the KW Institute of Contemporary Art in Berlin. In the spring of 2018, several of Hughes-Freeland's films were shown at the Museum of Modern Art as "Transgressive Shorts, 1979–1994", part of its exhibition, "Club 57: Film, Performance, and Art in the East Village, 1978–1983." Hughes-Freeland works shown at the MOMA exhibition included "Baby Doll," "Play Boy," "Rat Trap" (co-directed with Tommy Turner), "Nymphomania" (co-directed with Holly Adams), "Jane Gone," and "Playboy Voodoo" (co-directed with Troyano).

== Personal life ==
Hughes-Freeland has been married to the writer, critic and curator Carlo McCormick since 1985. They live in Manhattan's East Village, where they raised their son.

== Filmography ==
- Walking Film (1982)
- Birthday Party (1982)
- 33 R.P.M. (1982)
- Baby Doll (1982)
- Joker (1983)
- Play Boy (1984)
- Graffiti Hall of Fame (1984)
- Styx (1984)
- Poppo At 8 B.C., Parts I–IV (1984–85)
- Rhonda Goes to Hollywood (1985)
- Bidlo Does Klein: Models in Blue (1985)
- Virginia Tripping Film (1985)
- Butthole Surfers (1986)
- Rat Trap (with Tommy Turner) (1986)
- Jane Gone (1987)
- The Story Of The Little Green Man (1989)
- Dirty (1992)
- Nymphomania (1994)
- Watch Out (2007)
- Instinct (2009)
- Gift (2010)
- Video contribution to Peace Project produced by Jurgen Brunning, Berlin (2002)
- Kind (2013)
- Hippie Home Movie (2013)
- Lost Movie/The Bug (work in progress)
