= IEMA =

IEMA may refer to:

- Interactive Entertainment Merchants Association
- Institute of Environmental Management and Assessment
- Inland Empire Museum of Art, now known as the Sasse Museum of Art
