= Naked Lens: Beat Cinema =

1997 book by Jack Sargeant

- Author: Jack Sargeant
- Publisher: Creation Books
- Publication date: 1997
- Pages: 250

Naked Lens: Beat Cinema is a book by Jack Sargeant about the relationship between Beat culture and underground film. First published by Creation Books in 1997, the book has been subsequently republished in two different English language editions, by Creation Books in 2001 and Soft Skull in 2008. The book also features contributions from Tessa Hughes-Freeland, Stephanie Watson, and Arthur and Corrine Cantrill.

== Contents ==
The book is divided into two sections with an appendix. The first section examines the Robert Frank and Alfred Leslie film Pull My Daisy which stars Allen Ginsberg and Gregory Corso and is narrated by Jack Kerouac. Following chapters include essays on John Cassavetes film Shadows, Ron Rice's film The Flower Thief, filmmakers Harry Smith and Jack Smith, underground filmmaker Jonas Mekas, and British director Peter Whitehead. Also included is an interview with Ginsberg and a chapter on Chappaqua.

The second section of the book focuses on William S. Burroughs and his extensive collaborations with Antony Balch, Brion Gysin, and Ian Sommerville, as well as post-punk film makers and artists who were inspired by Burroughs' writings.

The appendix examines exploitation film and Hollywood versions of beatnik film as well as other writers affiliated with the group.

== Different editions ==
- The first Creation edition has a black and white cover, depicting Jack Kerouac from Pull My Daisy.
- The second edition features an image from Naked Lunch by David Cronenberg.
- The Soft Skull edition features a black and white cover with Allen Ginsberg from Wholly Communion by Peter Whitehead.
- The third edition features a new chapter on animated versions William Burroughs' films.
