= Microscope Gallery =

Contemporary art gallery in New York

Coordinates: 40.706291°N 73.921167°W

Microscope Gallery is a contemporary art gallery located at 527 West 29th Street, New York, NY 10001. It was founded by artists and curators Elle Burchill and Andrea Monti and opened in September 2010 in Bushwick, Brooklyn, NY. The gallery specializes in time-based works, particularly film, sound, digital and performance art. Sculpture, installation, painting, mixed media and photographic works are also regularly shown at Microscope.

Some of the artists whose work has been exhibited at Microscope include Anthology Film Archives founder Jonas Mekas, Fluxus founding member George Maciunas, Nick Zedd, Michael Snow, Barbara Hammer, Amos Poe, Ken Jacobs, Su Friedrich, and Lary 7.

The gallery's represented artists have included Peggy Ahwesh, Ina Archer, Katherine Bauer, Kamari Carter, Ben Coonley, DataSpaceTime (Lisa Gwilliam & Ray Sweeten), Raul Vincent Enriquez, Bradley Eros, James Fotopoulos, Sarah Halpern, Takahiko Iimura, Le'Andra LeSeur, Jeanne Liotta, Yasue Maetake, Eileen Maxson, Zach Nader, Rachel Phillips, Kevin Reuning, Rachel Rosheger, Kurt Schwerdtfeger, Allison Somers, Anita Thacher, Ezra Wube, and Marni Kotak (whose performances include The Birth of Baby X, during which she gave birth in the gallery), and others.
