= Deathtripping =

1995 book by Jack Sargeant

First published as Deathtripping: The Cinema of Transgression by Creation Books in 1995 and subsequently republished as Deathtripping: The Extreme Underground by Soft Skull Press, Deathtripping is a book by Jack Sargeant which examines the New York based, post-punk underground film movement known as the Cinema of Transgression that formed around the manifesto written by underground filmmaker Nick Zedd. The loose-knit group of underground filmmakers included Richard Kern, Tommy Turner, Lydia Lunch, Beth B, Cassandra Stark, Joe Coleman and David Wojnarowicz, amongst others.

The book examines the work of the Cinema of Transgression filmmakers through lengthy interviews with directors, collaborators, musicians and actors associated with the movement. Alongside these the book features analyses of films, an overview of the history of the movement and its influences. It features an appendix of scripts by some of the filmmakers.

Following the publication of the book Jack Sargeant co-produced a VHS tape with the British Film Institute showcasing a number of these films.

The films Kill Your Idols (2006) and Blank City (2010) both feature Jack talking about the films and the writing of Deathtripping.

== Various Editions ==
The first and second editions were both published by Creation Books in 1995 and 1999. Both featured a pink cover depicting a photo by Richard Kern. The second edition was numbered as part of Creation Books' Film Collection series. In 2007 Soft Skull published a redesigned copy which featured various corrections, a new introduction and afterwards alongside numerous new illustrations.
