= Aline Mare =

American artist

- Born: 1961 (age 64–65); Bronxville, New York, US
- Education: SUNY Buffalo; Bard College
- Known for: Performance, photography, installation art
- Website: www.alinemare.com

Aline Mare (aka Aline Psyche Mare) is an American visual artist, performing artist and filmmaker who creates photo-based, hand-finished, multimedia works combine alternative processes and digital technology, remixing nature-based imagery to create surreal compositions that hover between creation and decay.

== Early life and education ==
Aline Mare was born in 1961 in Bronxville, New York, "into a family of movie and theatre professionals based in New York City." She was named after her great-aunt, stage actress and Busby Berkeley film actress, Aline MacMahon. Her paternal grandfather was Arthur L. Mayer, a motion-picture exhibitor, distributor, lecturer, and film historian.

Mare completed her undergraduate work at SUNY Buffalo's Center for Media Study. She studied with Nam June Paik, Paul Sharits, Hollis Frampton, and Tony Conrad. She also studied at Bard College. In 1998 she moved to San Francisco to complete a Master of Fine Arts at the San Francisco Art Institute, where she produced the experimental film Saline's Solution, about a late-term abortion; the film received support and awards internationally and was shown at The Cinematheque in San Francisco, the Whitney Museum, and the Museum of Modern Art in New York City.

In the early 1980s Aline Mare lived on Ludlow Street in Manhattan, along with other no wave Colab artists connected with ABC No Rio (especially Jane Sherry and Bradley Eros). Mare contributed a text to the Just Another Asshole #6 book project as Aline Psyche Mare.

== Exhibitions ==
In 2013, Aline Mare was one of four artists in the exhibition Ways of Water sponsored by the Thoreau Center for Sustainability and shown in the China Brotsky Gallery at the Presidio in San Francisco. In 2016 she exhibited with Michael Giancristiano in Organic Integration, Two Worlds.

In 2017, she participated with a solo show Angle of Repose in the Mojave Show at the Museum of Art and History (MOAH) in Lancaster, California.

In 2021, Mare took part in an exhibit called The Shape of Life at Wonzimer Gallery in Los Angeles.

In 2023, Mare presented Infinite Imagination, a two-person exhibition with Gary Brewer, at Stazione di Napoli Afragola in Italy.

=== Selected recent exhibitions ===
- 2026: Galactic Nature, Liz's Antique Hardware, LA, CA
- 2026: Voices Beyond Boundaries, Sasse Museum of Art, Pomona, CA
- 2025: Out of the Ashes, Craig Krull Gallery, LA
- 2025: Mythology/Matriarchy, The Middle Room Gallery, LA
- 2024: Legacy: A Story of Love and Cultural Heritage, Art Hotel Gran Paradiso, Sorrento, Italy
- 2024: Women on the Verge, Westbeth Gallery, NYC, NY
- 2023: Finding Beauty, UOOORS Show, The Loft at Liz, LA, CA
- 2022: The Erotic Impulse in an Ever Becoming Universe, MASH Gallery, LA, CA

== Performance art and film ==
She performed in a multi-media film and music partnership Erotic Psyche with Bradley Eros, which explored the body and the senses. They performed mainly in Manhattan, at venues such as Franklin Furnace, The Kitchen, and the Pyramid Club. She also performed in Richard Foreman's play Pandering to the Masses: a Misrepresentation in 1975. She also worked with Meredith Monk and Vito Acconci and as a film editor with Richard Serra on Railroad Turnbridge and with Nancy Holt's on Sun Tunnels. She and Serra lived together and appear in a Robert Frank film, Keep Busy, shot in Nova Scotia.

Mare's film Blind Love was presented in the New York Film Festival Downtown in 1984.

Mare also participated in The Collective Unconscious, SELECTED EARLY WORKS BY THE CORE MAKERS OF NAKED EYE CINEMA, THE EXTENSION OF THE FILM PROGRAM AT ABC NO RIO.

In San Francisco, Mare renewed her friendship with novelist Kathy Acker. The two shared an interest in feminist politics. Mare began to focus on issues such as women’s right to choose, employing embryonic imagery in performances and installations. Saline's Solution was Aline Mare's film about her own fetal abortions. Saline's Solution was one of the independent films shown in the 1992 Black Maria Film and Video Festival.

In 1999, Aline Mare was artist-in-residence at Headlands Center for the Arts in the San Francisco Bay Area.
