= Peggy Ahwesh =

American experimental filmmaker and video artist

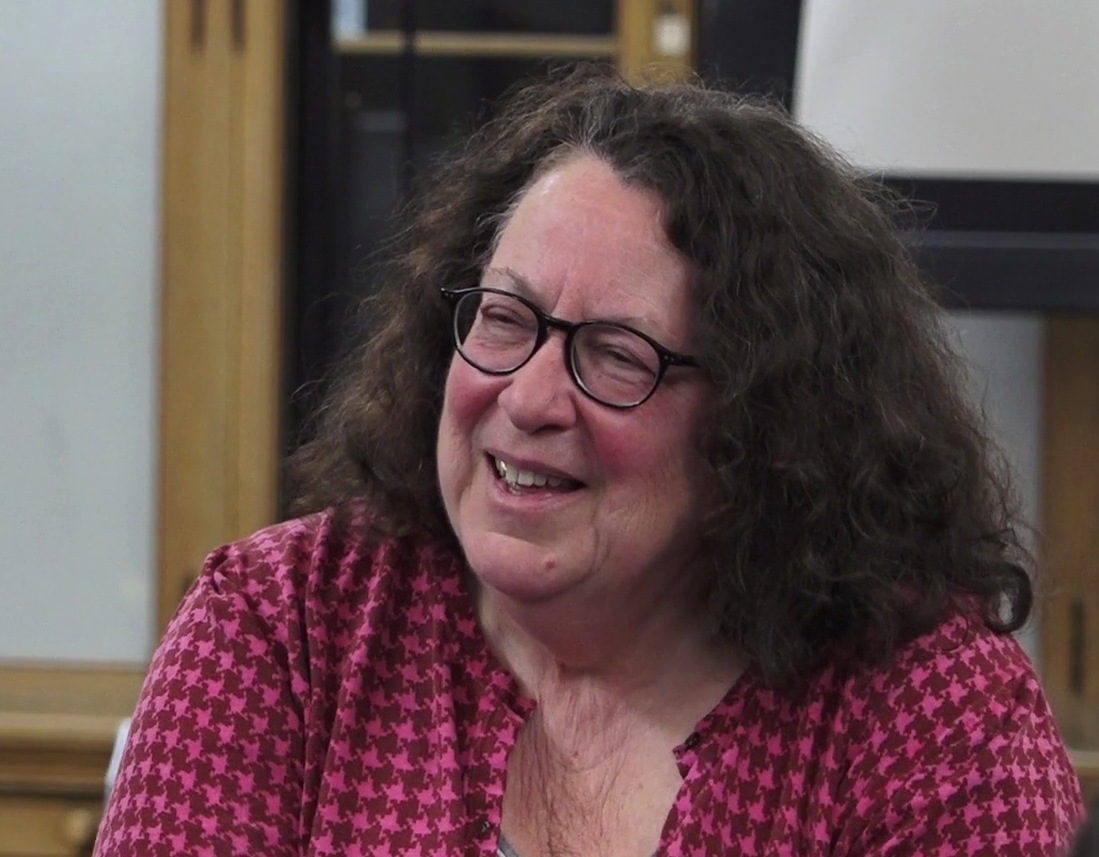
- Born: 1954 (age 71–72); Canonsburg, Pennsylvania, USA
- Citizenship: American
- Education: Antioch College
- Employer: Bard College (1990–present)
- Known for: Video art, film
- Movement: Experimental film

Peggy Ahwesh (born 1954 in Canonsburg, Pennsylvania) is an American experimental filmmaker and video artist. She received her B.F.A. at Antioch College. A bricoleur who has created both narrative works and documentaries, some projects are scripted and others incorporate improvised performance. She makes use of sync sound, found footage, digital animation, and Pixelvision video. Her work is primarily an investigation of cultural identity and the role of the subject in various genres. Her interests include genre; women, sexuality and feminism; reenactment; and artists' books. Her works have been shown worldwide, including in San Francisco, New York, Barcelona, London, Toronto, Rotterdam, and Créteil, France. Starting in 1990, she has taught at Bard College as a Professor of Film and Electronic Arts. Her teaching interests include: experimental media, history of the non-fiction film, and women in film.

== Career ==
Peggy Ahwesh went to Antioch College, where she became enamored with the works of radical artists and filmmakers like Paul Sharits, Tony Conrad, Carolee Schneeman and Joyce Wieland. After college, she returned to her hometown of Cannonsburg, where she began her film career working on Super 8 film. She thought Cannonsburg was a small industrial town that offered a freeing artistic feel. During the 1970s, she became involved with the local punk rock scene, and would create short films with her friends documenting the punk bands.

Following this, she began working at The Mattress Factory—a large art warehouse in Pittsburgh—where she began her own film series. One of her first guests was filmmaker George A. Romero. She began to show his work locally and befriended Romero's crew. By 1982, she began to work her way into the industry as a production assistant on Romero's feature films. There, she met good friends Natalka Voslakov and Maggie Strosser. Ahwesh claims Romero to be a huge influence on her as he was knowledgeable on race, gender, and independent films. Soon, Ahwesh joined Pittsburgh Filmmakers as a programmer. She also wrote grants and collaborated with local clubs and the University of Pittsburgh. In 1980, Ahwesh did a big group show of local filmmakers. She liked the idea of group shows because they got everybody involved.

By 1983, she created what is known as The Pittsburgh Trilogy—three films made back to back that documented the lives of her friends during the summer of 1983. Ahwesh claims the three films: Verite Opera (1983), Paranormal Intelligence (1983), and Nostalgia for Paradise (1983) are not diary films, narratives or documentaries but rather "portraits" of her friends. The three films helped explore Ahwesh's interest in her friends and helped answer the questions of what kind of relationship does one have with a person, what kind of relationship does the camera have with a person, how do you shoot positive and negative space and what is it about people that makes them interesting? Ahwesh was not aware that she had copied the name for the trilogy from another experimental filmmaker, Stan Brakhage.

In 1990 Ahwesh received recognition for her film The Deadman, an adaptation of a short story by Georges Bataille co-directed with frequent collaborator Keith Sanborn. The film was given a 4k digital restoration (and theatrical run) by Anthology Film Archives in 2022.

Ahwesh has frequently engaged in strategies of appropriation and bricolage in her films. An early example of this is in 1994's The Color of Love, which uses heavily eroded pornographic footage, set to music by Astor Piazzolla. Ahwesh's 2001 film She Puppet incorporates footage from the video game Tomb Raider. She Puppet was described by critic and curator Erika Balsom as Ahwesh's "most famous work" and as "a feminist critique of [Lara] Croft's problematic identity." Later appropriation films include The Blackest Sea (2016) and The Falling Sky (2017), both of which draw on unedited, recombined footage from an animated online news source.

Ahwesh has frequently championed the work of exploitation filmmaker Doris Wishman. Her 1995 zine devoted to Wishman's films was republished by Light Industry and Inpatient Press in 2019.

In 1990 Ahwesh began teaching at Bard College. Currently she is Professor Emerita of Film and Electronic Art.

== Awards ==
- Bard College Research Grant (2002)
- Creative Capital (2002)
- Alpert Award in the Arts, Cal Arts/Alpert Foundation (2000)
- New York Foundation for the Arts (NYFA), Video Fellowship (2000)
- New York Foundation for the Arts (NYSCA), Film/Video Fellowship (1993) (2002)
- New York Foundation for the Arts (NYSCA), Distribution Grant (1992) (1999)
- Guggenheim Foundation, Fellowship (1996)
- Jerome Foundation, Film Project Award (1990) (1998)
- Art Matters (1992) (1995)

== Selected filmography ==
- Bethlehem (2009) 8 minutes, color, video
- The Third Body (2008) 9 min, color, video
- Warm Objects (2007) 5 min, color, video
- Beirut Outtakes (2007) 7 min, video
- Dedication (2006) 4 min, color, video
- Certain Women, with Bobby Abate, (2004) 72 min, video
- The Star Eaters (2003), 24 min, video
- She Puppet (2001), 15 min, color, video
- Heaven's Gate (2000–01), 3:53 min, b&w, video
- 73 Suspect Words & Heaven's Gate (1999–2000) 8 min, video
- Nocturne (1998) 30 min, b&w, 16 mm film
- The Vision Machine (1997), 20 min, b&w and color, 16 mm film
- Magnetism, Attraction and Repulsion, Deep Sleep, Auto Suggestion, Animal Magnetism, Mesmerism, and Fascination (1996), 16 min, color, video
- Trick Film (1996), 5 min, 16mm film
- The Color of Love (1994), 10 min, color, sound, 16 mm film
- The Scary Movie (1993), 9 min, b&w, sound, 16 mm film
- Strange Weather, with Margie Strosser, (1993) 50 min, video, b&w
- Martina's Playhouse (1989), 20 min, color, sound, Super 8 film
- The Deadman, with Keith Sanborn, (1990), 39 min, b&w, 16 mm film
- I Ride a Pony Named Flame (1988) 5 min, video
- Philosophy in the Bedroom (1987) 10 min, Super 8 film
- From Romance to Ritual (1985) 10 min, Super 8 film
- The Fragments Project (1985–1995), 50 min, color, sound, Super 8 film
- Ode to the New Pre-History (1984–1987) 25 min, Super 8 film
- Pittsburgh Trilogy (1983) 50 min, Super 8 film

== Selected screenings and exhibitions ==
- 2021: One Person Shows
  - Vision Machines; Spike Island, Bristol, UK
- 2019: One Person Shows
  - Cleave; Microscope Gallery, Brooklyn, NY
- 2014-2015: One Person Shows
  - Kissing Point; Microscope Gallery, Brooklyn, NY
- 2006: One Person Shows
  - Museo Nacional Centro de Arte Reina Sofia; Madrid, Spain (retrospective)
  - American University of Beirut; Beirut, Lebanon
  - Anthology Film Archives; NY, NY (theatrical run, Certain Women)
  - "Ahwesh: Personal Archive Show", Anthology Film Archives; NY, NY
- 2006. Selected Festivals. Group Shows
  - "Stitch & Split: Selves & Territories in Science Fiction", Fundació Antoni Tàpies; Barcelona, Spain
  - The Württembergischer Kunstverein; Stuttgart, Germany
  - IAMNOWHERE, Center for Curatorial Studies, Bard College; Annandale, NY
  - "The Imagination of Disaster", Ocularis; Brooklyn, NY
  - Silverlake Film Festival: MP4 Fest, Los Angeles, CA
  - Copilandia: una Isla Libre de Propiedad Intellectual, Seville, Spain (traveled)
  - "Art as a Form of Conversation", Dashanzi Arts Festival, Beijing, China (traveled)
  - Centre de Cultura Contemporania, Barcelona, Spain
  - "Games People Play", Pacific Film Archive, Berkeley, CA
  - Foundation for Art, Culture & Technology, Liverpool, UK
  - "Breaking the Game", www.workspace-unlimited.org (on-line symposium)
- 2005. One Person Shows
  - Wisconsin Film Festival; Madison, WI (retrospective)
  - femme totale; Dortmund, Germany (screening & panel)
  - University of Chicago, Film Studies Center; Chicago, Il
- 2005. Selected Festivals. Group Shows
  - Pompidou Center; Paris, France MIX: NY
  - Lesbian & Gay Experimental Film Festival; NY, NY
  - "Jerome, Hill & Foundation", MoMA; NY, NY (screening & panel)
  - The Childhood Show, Magic Lantern Cinema; Providence, RI
  - "Brides of Frankenstein", San Jose Museum of Art; San Jose, CA
- 2004. One Person Shows
  - Rotterdam International Film Festival; Rotterdam, The Netherlands
  - The Museum of Modern Art, Mediascope; New York, NY
  - New York Underground Film Festival; New York, NY (traveled)
  - Institute for Studies in the Arts, ASU; Tempe, Arizona
  - "Videos by Peggy Ahwesh", Terrorvision Show, Exit Art; New York, NY
  - Redcat Theater, California Institute of the Arts; Valencia, CA (residency)
  - Chicago Underground Film Festival; Chicago, IL
  - Brighton Cinematheque; Brighton, UK
  - Zinebi 46 Festival; Bilbao, Spain
  - Cinematexas 10; Austin, TX
  - Union Theater, University of Wisconsin-Milwaukee; Milwaukee, WI
- 2004. Selected Festivals. Group Shows
  - "Visions of Excess" Press Play Video, Carnegie Mellon University; Pittsburgh, PA
  - "The Walking Picture Palace", Anthology Film Archives; NY, NY
  - New York Video Festival; Film Society of Lincoln Center; New York, NY
  - European Media Arts Festival; Osnabruck, Germany
  - "Acting Out", York University; Toronto, Canada
  - Festival of Contemporary Arts: City of Women; Ljubljana, Slovenia
  - "Lookalike: Barbie Lolita Lara Croft", Nederlands Fotomuseum; Amsterdam, the Netherlands
- 2003. One Person Shows
  - Mills College Art Museum, Contemporary Exhibitions; Oakland, CA
  - Pixil This 12; LA, CA Princeton University; Princeton, NJ
  - Binghamton University; Binghamton, NY
- 2003. Selected Festivals. Group Shows
  - Image Forum Festival; Tokyo, Japan (traveled)
  - Russian National Contemporary Art Center, Experimental Videos from US; Moscow, Russia (traveled)
  - "I Wonder About You and Through You: Women Respond to Technology with Wonder and Caution"; Portland, OR
  - Bellevue Arts Museum; Seattle, WA
  - Moscow International Film Fest; Russia (traveled)
  - MoMA, Stand-by retrospective program; NY
  - Fundacio Antoni Tàpies, "Stitch and Split: Selves and Territories in Science Fiction"; Barcelona, Spain
  - "Mirror, Mirror", Surrey Institute of Art & Design; London, UK
- 2002. One Person Shows
  - "Sandbox Antics, Tantrums, and Tourist Attractions", Pittsburgh Filmmakers and Carnegie Mellon University; Pittsburgh, PA (retrospective)
  - New Collaborations: Electronic Intersections, Institute for Electronic Arts, School of Art and Design, Alfred University; Alfred, NY (conference)
- 2002. Selected Festivals. Group Shows
  - 2002 Biennial Exhibition, Whitney Museum of American Art, NY
  - Rotterdam International Film Festival; Rotterdam, The Netherlands
  - Image Forum Festival; Tokyo, Japan (traveled)
  - Animations, P.S.1/MoMA; Queens, NY (traveled Kunst Werke Berlin)
  - Electromediascope, The Nelson-Atkins Museum of Art, Department of Modern and Contemporary Art; Kansas City, MO
  - Dangerous Beauty: The Videos, Jewish Community Center; NY
  - Verbindingen/Jonctions Festival 6; Brussels, Belgium
  - Machine Love, Vidarte 2002 International Festival; Mexico City, Mexico
  - FILMS THAT RISE TO THE SURFACE (OF CLARIFIED BUTTER); Balagan, Boston
  - "Catastrophe & Spectacle", Oberhausen Film Festival; Oberhausen, Germany
- 2001. One Person Shows
  - California Institute of the Arts; Valencia, CA (screenings/residency)
  - Sam Spiegel Film School; Jerusalem, Israel (screenings/residency)
  - The Jerusalem Cinematheque; Jerusalem, Israel
  - Women Direct, Ithaca College; Ithaca, NY (screening & conference)
  - "All the Girls with Cameras in Their Heads", Cinematexas 6; Austin, TX (retrospective)
- 2001. Selected Festivals. Group Shows
  - Laracroft:ism, On Female Heroines, Nomads and Residents panel; NY
  - "Imitation of Kiss", Warhol Museum; Pittsburgh, PA (traveled)
  - Three Women from Brooklyn, Ocularis; Brooklyn, NY
  - New York Video Festival, Film Society of Lincoln Center; NY
  - Pandaemonium: Festival of the Moving Image; London, UK (traveled)
  - Some Kind of Loving, Joanie4Jackie (curator Astria Suparak) (traveled)
  - The Stained Handkerchief, Maastricht; The Netherlands (traveled)
  - To Make it Better Every Time: Internal Security; Munich, Germany (traveled)
  - "All is Fair in Love and War"; Amsterdam, the Netherlands (traveled)
- 2000. One Person Shows
  - The Flaherty Seminar, International Film Seminars, NY (curator Kathy Geritz)
  - The American Century: Art & Culture (1950–2000), Whitney Museum of American Art; New York, NY
- 2000. Selected Festivals. Group Shows
  - The End: An Independent View of Contemporary Culture ('82-'00), Exit Art; NY
  - Science is Fiction: The Films of Jean Painleve, MoMA; NY
  - "The Color of Ritual, The Color of Thought", Whitney Museum of American Art; NY
  - World Wide Video Festival; Amsterdam, the Netherlands
  - DUMBO Arts Festival; Brooklyn, NY Cinematexas 5, Austin, TX
  - The Trinity Show, Ocularis; Brooklyn, NY (curator Jim Browne)
- 1999. One Person Shows
  - The Guggenheim Museum; NY (lecture) LUX Cinema; London, England (retrospective)
  - Warhol's Grave, The Balie Theater; Amsterdam, the Netherlands
  - The Grand Illusion Cinema/Wiggly World; Seattle, WA
  - Yerba Buena Center for the Arts; SF, CA (residency/retrospective)
  - Splice This!, S8mm Film Festival; Toronto, Canada (retrospective)
  - Three by Peggy Ahwesh, Anthology Film Archives; NY
  - Nocturne and What!, Pacific Film Archive; Berkeley, CA
  - Criminal Sexuality: The Films of Peggy Ahwesh, Pacific Cinematheque; Vancouver, Canada (retrospective)
- 1999. Selected Festivals. Group Shows
  - Rotterdam International Film Festival; The Netherlands
  - European Media Art Festival; Osnabruck, Germany
  - GirlsKnifeTheoryGore, Cornershop; Buffalo, NY
  - Dark Shadows: Recent Avant-Garde Films, Chicago Filmmakers; Chicago, IL
- 1998. One Person Shows
  - S8mm Films by Peggy Ahwesh, MoMA; NY
  - The Secret Charts, Jonctions Festival; Brussels, Belgium (installation w Amy Sillman)
  - Girls Beware! (reprise), Jonctions Festival 2; Brussels, Belgium
- 1998. Selected Festivals. Group Shows
  - Big As Life: An American History of 8mm Films, MoMA; NY
  - Pandaemonium: Festival of the Moving Image; London, England
  - Lo-Fi Baroque, Threadwaxing Space; New York, NY
  - Reel New York, WNET/Ch13 TV; New York, NY
  - MadCat Women's Film Festival; San Francisco, CA
  - New York Film Festival, Film Society of Lincoln Center; NY (traveled)
- 1997. One Person Shows
  - Girls Beware!, New American Film & Video Series, Whitney Museum of American Art; NY (retrospective)
  - Subtle Subversions: The Films of Peggy Ahwesh, Chicago Filmmakers; Chicago, IL
  - Low Tech, Museu d'Art Contemporani Barcelona; Barcelona, Spain
- 1997. Selected Festivals. Group Shows
  - Gothic: Transmutations of Horror in Late 20th Century Art, ICA; Boston, MA (traveled)
  - MIX '97: NY Lesbian and Gay Experimental Film Festival; NY
  - MIX '97: Mexico and MIX '97: Brazil (traveled)
  - Kybernetes: Encuentro de Video y Electronicas; Bogotá, Colombia
- 1996. One Person Shows
  - Vermont College, MFA Program; Montpelier, VT (visiting artist)
  - Cinema Studies Program, NYU; New York, NY
  - Open Zone: Interactive Phenomena & Quicktime; Barcelona, Spain (traveled)
- 1996. Selected Festivals. Group Shows
  - Korper Und Sexualitat, deutsches filmmuseum; Frankfurt, Germany
  - Cine Club at Anthology Film Archive; NY
  - Danish Workshop Film Festival; Copenhagen, Denmark
  - Slacker Attitude, London Electronic Arts; London, England (traveled)
  - A Tribute to Squat Theater, Artists' Space; NY
  - 1995 Whitney Biennial Exhibition; NY (traveled)
  - Statens Museum for Kunst; Copenhagen, Denmark
- 1995. One Person Shows
  - University of South Florida; Tampa, FL (visiting artist)
  - The Films of Peggy Ahwesh, Pacific Film Archives; Berkeley, CA
  - Odd and Original: Sexploitation Films by Doris Wishman, Roxy Theater & the Other Cinema; San Francisco, CA (curator)
- 1995. Selected Festivals. Group Shows
  - More Hysteria, Please!, Columbia University; NY
  - (Lacanian Ink) Festival International du Nouveau Cinema et de la Video; Montreal, Canada
  - Coming to Power: Xperimental Films by Women, Film Makers' Co-op; NY (traveled)
  - San Francisco International Film Festival; San Francisco, CA
  - 1995 Biennial Exhibition, Whitney Museum of American Art; NY (traveled)
  - Wellington and Auckland International Film Festivals; New Zealand
- 1994. One Person Shows
  - Harvard Film Archive, Carpenter Center for the Arts; Cambridge, MA (retrospective)
  - American Museum of the Moving Image; Queens, NY
  - Anthology Film Archives; New York, NY
  - World Wide Video Festival; The Hague, The Netherlands
- 1994. Selected Festivals. Group Shows
  - Bad Girls, The New Museum; NY (w The Scary Movie)
  - "Pixilvision: The Philosophical Toy", 3rd NY Video Festival; NY
  - American Film Institute Video Festival; Los Angeles, CA
  - Impakt Festival; Utrecht, The Netherlands
  - Ex-Post Factory: After Warhol, Pacific Film Archive; Berkeley, CA
  - Festival of Independents; Philadelphia
  - PA MIX 94: NY Gay & Lesbian Experimental Film Festival; NY MIX '94 Brazil: Festival das Manifestacoes da Sexualidade, Brazil (traveled)
  - Museum of Sound and Image; São Paulo, Brazil (traveled)
  - Man Trouble, Exit Art; NY (curator Jason Simon)
  - American Independence, Institute for Contemporary Art; London, England
  - X-Rated Films by Women, Films Charas; New York
- 1993. One Person Shows
  - Video Premiers, Museum of Modern Art; NY (w Margie Strosser)
  - Juger und Sammler: Die Neuen Nomaden, Eiszeit Kino; Berlin, Germany
  - Strange Paradises, The Cinematheque; San Francisco, CA
  - The Opium Den at The Pleasure Dome at Cine Cycle; Toronto, Canada
- 1993. Selected Festivals. Group Shows
  - New Directions in American AG (1981–91), London Film Co-op; England (traveled)
  - Coming to Power: Xplicit Films by Women, David Zwerner Gallery; NY (traveled)
  - Dallas Video Festival; Dallas, Texas
  - Picturing Ritual, Center for Photography at Woodstock; Woodstock, NY
- 1992. One Person Shows
  - Sarah Lawrence College; Bronxville, NY sex/POSITIVE; Philadelphia, PA (conference/screening)
  - University of Florida, a Critical Art Ensemble project; Tallahassee, FL
  - Coming Soon, American Culture & Popular Culture Associations Annual Conference; Louisville, KY (w Keith Sanborn)
- 1992. Selected Festivals . Group Shows
  - Flaming and Other Creatures, Harvard Film Archive; Cambridge, MA
  - Through Her Eyes: Women in Film and Video, The Learning Channel Eros and Thanatos, Woodstock Guild; Woodstock, NY
  - The Travel and Leisure Show, 4 Walls; Brooklyn, NY
- 1991. One Person Shows
  - The Wexner Center; Columbus, OH Hallwalls Contemporary Arts Center; Buffalo, NY
- 1991. Selected Festivals. Group Shows
  - 1991 Biennial, Whitney Museum of American Art; NY (traveled)
  - "Return of Visual Pleasure", Whitney Museum of American Art; NY
  - Films de Femmes Fest International de CrÈteil et du Marne; Creteil, France
  - Ars Electronica Video Festival; Linz, Austria
  - Reframing the Family, Artists Space; New York, NY
  - Melbourne & Sidney International Film Festivals; Australia
  - Al-Ismailiyah International Film Festival; Al-Ismailiyah, Egypt
  - Pearls Before Swine, Eiszeit Kino; Berlin, Germany
  - Nucleo dos Cineasates Independentes; Lisbon and O Porto, Portugal
- 1990. One Person Shows
  - Cineprobe, MoMA; NY
  - The Carnegie Museum of Art; Pittsburgh, PA
  - The Pittsburgh Filmmakers; Pittsburgh, PA
  - In Bataille's Dark Chamber, The Collective for Living Cinema; NY (w Keith Sanborn)
  - "Child", Kitchen Center for Video, Music & Performance; NY (panel/screening)
  - Image Film and Video Center; Atlanta, GA
  - Anti-Censorship Fest, Coalition for Freedom of Expression; Berkeley, CA
  - The London International Film Festival; London, England
  - The Pleasure Dome; Toronto, Canada
- 1990. Selected Festivals. Group Shows
  - Image World, Whitney Museum of American Art; NY
  - A Passage Illuminated: American A/G Film 1980–90; Amsterdam, the Netherlands
  - Festival de Nouveau Cinema; Montreal,
  - Canada Independent Focus, WNET/CH 13; NY, NY
  - Are You Now or Have You Ever Been. . ., Film in the Cities; Minneapolis, MN
  - Opaque Projections: Childhood & Memory, LACE; Los Angeles, CA
  - Sexual Politics: The Cutting Edge, Dartmouth College; Hanover, NH
- 1989. One Person Shows
  - In Bataille's Dark Chamber, Small Press Distribution Center; Berkeley (w Keith Sanborn)
  - Old & New Masters of Super 8, Anthology Film Archives; NY
  - The Collective for Living Cinema; New York Massachusetts College of Art; Boston, MA
- 1989. Selected Festivals. Group Shows
  - The Politics & Poetics of Sexuality, Feminism & Reproductive Freedom, Hall
  - walls Breaking the Fall, Collective for Living Cinema; New York (curator Mark McElhatten)
  - "The Body & Other Tales of Joy & Woe", Critical Art Ensemble Media Festival; Tallahassee, FL
- 1987. One Person Shows
  - Film Forum; Los Angeles, CA
  - The Cinematheque; San Francisco, CA
  - Super 8mm: The Last Frontier, Currier Gallery of Art; Manchester, NH
- 1987. Selected Festivals. Group Shows
  - Infermental: A Video Magazine; Buffalo, NY (curators Chris Hill & Peter Weibel) (traveled)
  - Independent America, American Museum of the Moving Image; Queens, NY
  - Speculum of the Other Woman, The Other Cinema; SF, CA
  - Ann Arbor Super 8mm Film Festival; Ann Arbor, MI Super 8 Solar System, Artists Space; NY
- 1984. One Person Shows
  - Women's Caucus for Art, National Conference; Boston, MA
  - Super 8 Motel, The Kitchen Center; NY Women in Film, William Penn Museum; Harrisburg, PA
  - Eiszeit Kino; Berlin, Germany
- 1984: Selected Festivals-Group Shows
  - Ironic Naturalism, Hallwalls; Buffalo, NY (screening/panel)

== Selected bibliography ==
- Ahwesh, Peggy. "Lara Croft: Tomb Raider." Film Comment 37 (July/August 2001) p 77.
- Arthur, Paul. "Bodies, Language and the Impeachment of Vision: American Avant-garde Film at 50" Persistence of Vision No. 11 (1995) CUNY
- Blaetz, Robin, ed. Women's Experimental Cinema: Critical Frameworks. Durham, NC: Duke University Press, 2008
- Dargis, Manohla. "On The Deadman." Artforum, 28 (May 1990) pp. 29–30.
- Gangitano, Lia. "Warhol's Grave", In Steve Reinke and Tom Taylor, ed. LUX: A Decade of Artists Film and Video. XYZ Books, Toronto (2000) pp. 306–11.
- Gorfinkel, Elena. "Arousal in Ruins: The Color of Love and the Haptic Object of Film History." World Picture 4. Spring 2010.
- Griffin, Tim. "Bury the Lead", World Art, no. 16 (1998) pp. 22 – 25.
- Gunning, Tom "Towards a Minor Cinema: Fonoroff, Herwitz, Ahwesh, Klahr, Lapore and Solomon" Motion Picture 3 (winter 89–90) pp 2–5.
- Handelman, Michelle. "Women's Studies" Filmmaker Magazine (Winter 2002) p 12.
- Hoberman, J. "Attack of the Mutants." The Village Voice 14 Mar. 2000: 115
- Iles, Chrissie "Biennial 2002 Exhibition Catalogue", Whitney Museum of American Art
- Jones, Kristin M. "Ahwesh at the Whitney." Artforum 36 (Nov 1997) pp. 118–119.
- Lewis, Jon, ed. The New American Cinema. Durham, NC: Duke University Press, 1998: 353-78
- Marks, Laura U. "Loving a Disappearing Image" Cinéma et Mélancolie Vol 8, no. 1–2, Québec (1999), pp 93–111.
- MacDonald, Scott, A Critical Cinema 5: Interviews with Independent Filmmakers, University of California Press, 2006.
- Russell, Catherine. "Culture as Fiction: The Ethnographic Impulse in the Films of Peggy Ahwesh, Su Friedrich, and Leslie Thornton." In Jon Lewis, ed. The New American Cinema. Durham & London: Duke University Press (1998) pp. 353–78.
- Smith, Gavin. "The Way of All Flesh." Film Comment 31 (July/August 1995) p. 18. Taubin, Amy. "Women on Top" The Village Voice (August 5, 1997) p. 74.
- Wees, William C. "The Color of Love and the Recycling of Pornography by Avant-Garde Filmmakers" FSAC Conference, Université Laval, May 2001. conference paper.
- Wees, William C. "Peggy's Playhouse: Contesting the Modernist Paradigm", Women's Experimental Cinema: Critical Frameworks, Ed. Robin Blaetz, Duke University Press, 2006.
