= Geek Maggot Bingo =

1983 film

- Directed by: Nick Zedd
- Written by: Nick Zedd
- Based on: an idea by Nick Zedd
- Produced by: Nick Zedd
- Starring: Robert Andrews; Brenda Bergman; Zacherle; Gumby Spangler; Saint Reverend; Richard Hell; Donna Death; Jen Jon Vomit; Bruno Zeus
- Cinematography: Nick Zedd
- Edited by: Nick Zedd
- Release date: April 1983
- Running time: 74 minutes
- Country: United States
- Language: English

Geek Maggot Bingo (also known as Geek Maggot Bingo or The Freak from Suckweasel Mountain) is a 1983 comedy horror film directed by Nick Zedd, who also scripted and shot the film.

The film was released in 1983 and a special screening was held at the Museum of Modern Art in New York City on January 21, 2018 as part of their film series "New York Film and Video: No Wave–Transgressive", where it played alongside Zedd's Police State. At a screening of Geek Maggot Bingo with the Collective for Living Cinema, Zedd "shot" a couple of people planted in the audience at the film's end, bursting blood bags for extra effect.

== Synopsis ==
The film follows the insane Dr. Frankenberry (Robert Andrews), who repeatedly attempts to reanimate the dead with the assistance of his hunchbacked assistant Geeko (Robert Zeus). Other characters include the professor's daughter Buffy (Brenda Bergman), who performs most of the film semi-nude, and falls victim to the vampire, and Flavian (Gumby Spangler), son of the professor at Frankenberry's university, Dean Quagmire (Jim Giacama) who had rejected Frankenberry's original experiments. There is also a punk rocker cowboy, The Rawhide Kid (Richard Hell), and a vampiress called Scumbalina (Donna Death).

Frankenberrry successfully creates hideous two-headed creature called The Formaldehyde Man (Tyler Smith), who goes on a rampage, killing several characters.

== Cast ==
- Zacherle as The Host
- Robert Andrews as Doctor Frankenberry
- Richard Hell as The Rawhide Kid
- Brenda Bergman as Buffy
- Donna Death as Scumbalina
- Bruno Zeus as Geeko
- Gumby Spangler as Flavian
- Tyler Smith as The Monster
- Jim Giacama as Dean Quagmire
- Robert Martin as The Bob
- Robert Elkin as The Boop
- Quasimodo Residue as The Boner

== Reception ==
Cookie Mueller reviewed Geek Maggot Bingo for the East Village Eye and wrote "I have never in my lifetime of experience with low-budget films seen one this low … It lies somewhere below the subculture, even beneath the New York subway system." TV Guide panned the film, calling it "A nothing little zit of a 16mm movie that attempts to make fun of horror pictures but instead mocks technical Renaissance man Nick Zedd." The film also received a review from Variety, which criticized the sound and lighting. In a review for a 1988 screening of the film in Toronto alongside Zedd's other films, The Toronto Star's Christopher Hume wrote that the film "fails to do anything except remind us of Zedd's limits" and that "[t]hough it seems black humor was the intention, the result is dumb and boring."

Kim Newman reflected on Geek Maggot Bingo in Nightmare Movie: A Critical Guide to Contemporary Horror Films, comparing it to Jack Hill's Spider Baby and stating that Zedd "tries to match Hill's tone" but that he "tries too hard and comes up with a movie that makes Al Adamson look like Martin Scorsese."
