= Bradley Eros =

American film director

Bradley Eros (born in 1952 in Fairfield, Illinois) is an experimental film director, actor, curator, poet, and performance artist who also makes Musique concrète sound collages, music videos, photographs, live projection performances, works on paper and art objects.

His work has been presented in multiple screenings and exhibitions at the Museum of Modern Art, and the Whitney Museum of American Art, including the 2004 Whitney Biennial, and is in the permanent collection of the museum. He has also created dozens of ‘zines, posters, soundtracks and unique artist’s books. He is represented by Microscope Gallery in New York City and is known for his work in the field of contracted cinema.

== Life and work ==
Among his first projects following his relocation from Illinois to NYC was a series of expanded cinema films with (and performed live with) Aline Mare in a multi-media film and music partnership called Erotic Psyche. In 1982 he helped organize (and appeared in) the Colab sponsored Erotic Psyche Show at ABC No Rio after he participated in The Times Square Show. His sound collage The Atom & Eve of Destruction (1983) appears on the first issue of Tellus Audio Cassette Magazine in 1983. In 1984, he made Mutable Fire, a collage film about destruction and desire.

From 1987 to 2016 he collaborated with the artist/filmmaker Jeanne Liotta. In 2020, he also collaborated with musician Lea Bertucci providing visuals for a video.

He is manager and researcher at Anthology Film Archives, as well as a member of the board of directors of The Film-Makers' Cooperative in New York City.

== Selected works ==
- Warp & Weft (with Lea Burtucci; 2019)
- Trans Trans (Transformers Transformed) (with Tim Geraghty; 2009)
- Aerodynamics of the Black Sun (2006)
- eros.ion (1999)
- Dervish Machine (1992)
- Subverted Horseplay (with former partner Jeanne Liotta; 1987-2016)
- Erotic Psyche (with Aline Mare; 1985)
- Mutable Fire (1984)
- Osmosis (1972-2002)

== See also ==
- No Wave Cinema
- Underground film
- Cinema of Transgression
- Expanded Cinema
