= Marni Kotak =

American artist (born 1974)

- Occupation: Artist

Marni Kotak (born 1974) is an American artist best known for her durational performance/exhibition The Birth of Baby X, in which she gave birth to her son Baby X (aka Baby Ajax) as a live performance at Microscope Gallery in Brooklyn, NY, USA, on October 25, 2011.

== Education ==
Kotak received her BA from Bard College and her MFA from Brooklyn College in 2006, where she was one of 18 graduating artists whose thesis exhibit was shut down and censored by NYC officials. The graduating artists sued and eventually settled with the city in exchange for a monetary award and a formal apology from Julius Spiegel, Brooklyn Borough Parks Commissioner.

== Performance art ==
Kotak's work, in which she presents her everyday life as performance art, includes live re-enactments of her own birth, losing her virginity in a blue Plymouth, and attending her grandfather's funeral. In an interview, the artist states that art and life are intertwined, and her inspiration for life-art fusion comes from artists like Linda Montano and Alan Kaprow. She is currently working on an ongoing performance re-contextualizing the everyday act of raising a child as performance art, called Raising Baby X.

In 2014, Kotak announced that she was on psychiatric medication to recover from postpartum depression, and that her next work of performance art would involve gradually going off the medication in public.

== Awards and recognition ==
Kotak is the winner of a 2012-2013 Franklin Furnace Fund award and a grant from the Brooklyn Arts Council. In 2011 she was named one of ARTINFO's 2011 "Women Who Shook Up The Art World."

== Personal life ==
Kotak grew up in North Attleboro, MA and currently lives and works in Brooklyn, NY. She is married to and often collaborates with her husband, noted visual artist Jason Robert Bell.

== See also ==
- Microscope Gallery
