= Jeanne Liotta =

American artist

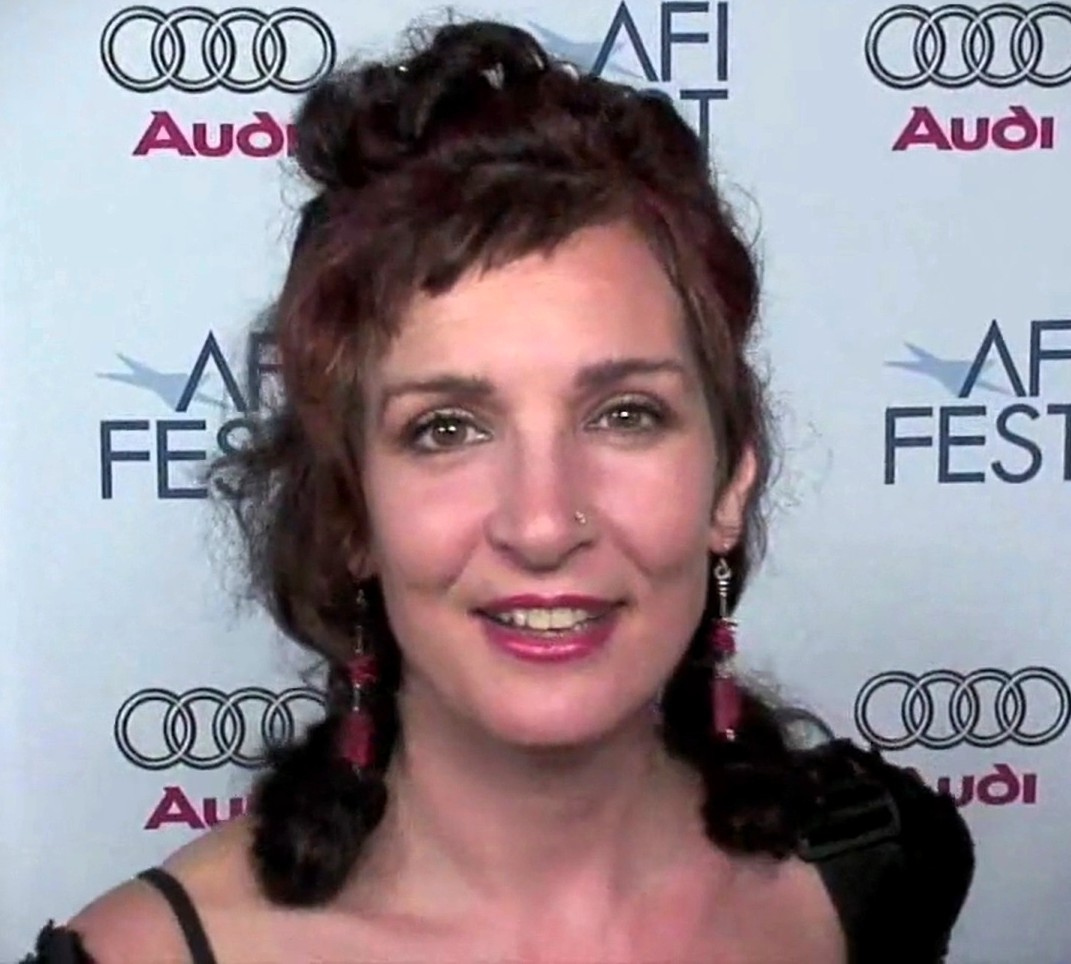
- Liotta in 2008
- Born: 1960 (age 65–66); Brooklyn, New York
- Known for: Visual arts, Experimental film
- Website: http://www.jeanneliotta.net/

Jeanne Liotta (born 1960) is an American visual artist who is primarily known for her experimental films. She is also currently a professor of film studies at the University of Colorado Boulder and the Milton Avery Graduate School of the Arts at Bard College. She lives between New York City and Colorado.

== Early life ==
Jeanne Liotta was born in 1960 in Brooklyn, New York. As an undergraduate, she studied theatre at New York University. During her time at NYU Liotta was involved with several collaborative artist groups, including Gargoyle Mechanique, The Living Theatre, and the Alchemical Theatre Company.

== Career ==
From 1985 to 1995 Liotta collaborated with the artist Bradley Eros on films, performances and other artworks. During that time they also collaborated with the band Circle X, making visuals and films for their performances. In 1993 Liotta founded the Firefly Cinema, an outdoor cinema that showed experimental films for free during the summers at the 6th and B Garden, Loisaida NYC. The Firefly Cinema stopped operating in 2010. Liotta has worked as a solo artist since 1996.

Since 2004 Liotta has been a Film-Video faculty member at the Milton Avery Graduate School of the Arts at Bard College. Since 2008 she has also been an assistant professor in the Film Studies Program at the University of Colorado Boulder. Liotta has also been conducting ongoing research on the Joseph Cornell Film Collection at the Anthology Film Archives.

Excerpt of Observando el cielo (2007)

Many of the artist's works focus on the intersection of art and science. For instance in Observando el cielo (2007) the artist examined our relationship with space, using seven years worth of night-time recordings of the sky. She also produced a series of short films entitled Science's 10 Most Beautiful Experiments. She has said: "Each person has the responsibility or opportunity as a human being to discover what their world is made of and what they think about it - to observe and take notes and reflect upon - that's our jobs as human beings somehow, that's what I feel like I'm doing when I make things. It's just my thinking."

=== Films ===
- Blue Moon (1988)
- Land of Enchantment (1994)
- Flimsy (1996)
- After Bellocq (1996)
- Optical Promises (1996)
- Ceci N'est Pas (1997)
- Versprechungen (1997)
- What Makes Day and Night (1998)
- Mutikara (1999)
- Bees and Ears (1999)
- Rothko Variations (2000)
- Window (2001)
- Maria Movie (2001)
- Manifesto (2001)
- Loretta (2003)
- L'Air du Temps (2003)
- Placid Unto (2003)
- Eclipse (2005)
- Hephaestus of the Airshaft (2005)
- One Day This May No Longer Exist (2006)
- Foucault's Pendulum (2006)
- Galileo's Experiment on Falling Objects (2006)
- Quote by Carl Sagan (2006)
- What We As Humans Trying Fallibly Forever (2006)
- Hymn to the Void (2006)
- Haiku (for Onizuka) (2007)
- Observando el cielo (2007)
- Sweet Dreams (2009)
- Sutro (2009)
- Crosswalk (2010)
- Dark Enough (2011)
- Counterintuitive Proposition for a Black Hole (2012)
- Some Worlds (2012)
- Diagram Squared (2012)
- Affect Theory (2013)
- Stein Times (2013)
- Property (2013)

== Film festivals ==
The artist's films have been shown at several film exhibitions, including:

- New York Film Festival (2003)
- International Film Festival Rotterdam (2008)

== Select exhibitions ==
- Whitney Biennial (2006)
- Sharjah Biennial 11 (2013)

== Recognition ==
In 2008 Liotta won the Tiger Award at the International Film Festival Rotterdam for her film Observando el cielo.

== Public collections ==
Liotta's works can be found in a number of public institutions, including:

- Museum of Modern Art
- The Film-Makers' Cooperative

== See also ==
- No Wave Cinema
- Underground film
- Cinema of Transgression
- Expanded Cinema
