= M. Henry Jones =

American artist and filmmaker (1957–2022)

M. Henry Jones (1957–2022) was an American visual artist, filmmaker, and animator. who lived in New York City's East Village neighborhood, and ran SnakeMonkey studio. He was known for his film "Soul City" (1977–79) which features the New York City band The Fleshtones.

== Early life ==
Jones was born February 16, 1957, in Louisiana and spent early childhood in Gulf Coast oil-industry trailer parks there and in East Texas behind Galveston. His family graduated to a yard and hand-built trailer addition, made from Hurricane Carla dump salvage, before moving to a tiny fruit-farming town on Lake Ontario, Wilson, N.Y., on March 4, 1966, within range of his father's engineering work in the chemical hive surrounding Niagara Falls. Nikola Tesla, who advised on the hydro-electric system on which that industry was based, became a favorite figure.

Jones began his model animation in 8th grade, after seeing a Zagreb animation reel, encouraged by both his family and a group of young teachers at Wilson Central High School. He watched the pivotal PBS "Film Odyssey" series of 1971–72 with his school film club and was most taken with the stop-motion in Jean Cocteau's "La belle et la bête." Jones rode his ten-speed 33 miles to spend weekends in the then film hotbed of SUNY/Buffalo. The quintessential autodidact, he also read through the 18 volumes of the Life Library of Photography (published 1970–72), procured through inter-library loan by the small town library, and began landscape and portrait photography, learning to develop and print in a neighbor's home darkroom. He spent three summers as construction assistant to Land Art creators at Artpark on the Niagara River.

== Career in New York City ==
Jones arrived in New York in 1975 as a film student at the School of Visual Arts. In his first years in the East Village he was a central figure at Club 57, and he created the two animated rock videos for which he is best known, "Soul City" and "Go-Go Girl," immediately before MTV's start in 1981. He also shot "Brand New Cadillac," which was finally edited in 2006. During his freshman year at SVA he began to spend time with Harry Everett Smith at the Chelsea Hotel. In 1983 he was hired by the Globus brothers to be the technical assistant to Marquis André Roger Lannes de Montebello, who was perfecting CrystalChrome, a form of 3D photography. His encounters with these two very different characters merged with his already considerable experience with animation to shape the rest of his life.

From 1988 to 1995 he directed a series of nationally broadcast animated commercials for the America's Best eyeglasses chain. At the same time he began work on animation in the form of lenticulars as a member of the Depthography group. In the '90s that lenticular work would morph into the Fly's Eye photography that had been in development by Roger de Montebello until his passing in 1986. Jones also experimented with hand-built stereo pinhole cameras. His storefront studio SnakeMonkey, on Avenue A in the East Village, became a magnet for fellow artists and their children.

From 1993 to 2006 Jones built and toured "Harry Smith: A Re-Creation," a tribute in which he realized Smith's dreams for the elaborate projection of his animated films. The show was an embroidered compendium of Smith's films shown in the manner intended by Smith—as performances—using stroboscopic effects, multiple projections, and magic lanterns.

During 1988–92 Mark Austin Brady and Jones were cinematographers on Rachel Amodeo's film "What About Me," which was favorably reviewed by "The Wall Street Journal" and "The New Yorker" as "a hidden masterwork that brings grace and cosmic humor to the grimy streets of eighties New York."

In the late '90s and the aughts he constructed his "stroboscopic zoetropes," large kinetic sculptures with model-animation "puppets." When a strobe light hit the sequence of puppets attached to a spinning steel wheel, they would animate. In 2007 Jones directed a final rock video, "Bangin' in my Head," with animation of drawings by his son Atticus. Following these major projects, Jones devoted himself exclusively to the development of SnakeMonkey Fly's Eye 3D photography until his untimely death on June 16, 2022, at the age of 65, from cancer discovered late during the COVID-19 pandemic.

== Screenings, exhibitions, and museum collections ==
Jones was a continual presence in the independent film scene in lower Manhattan in the late '70s and early '80s. "Soul City" was circulated in the United States and Europe in the 1980s in short-film compilations assembled by Serious Business Company and by the American Federation of Arts. He exhibited lenticulars with the Depthography group from 1991 to 2003. "Harry Smith: A Re-Creation" toured from 1993 to 2006.

His work was the subject of retrospectives at Anthology Film Archives in 2011 and 2017. He had large solo exhibitions at the Garner Arts Center in 2015–16, and the Burchfield Penney Art Center in 2017–18. During the Garner Arts Center show he was interviewed by Anthony Haden-Guest

Jones was included in the exhibition "Club 57, Film, Performance, and Art in the East Village, 1978–1983," October 31, 2017 – April 8, 2018, at The Museum of Modern Art, New York.

In 2021, he was interviewed in Filo Sofi Art's webinar, "Disclosures through Dialogue: M. Henry Jones." He discussed his body of work, from his trilogy of films documenting the New York punk scene to his "Fly's Eye" 3D photography technique, which enables 3D photography to be rendered and presented to audiences without the need for special glasses or viewing equipment.

His films are in the permanent collections of the Museum of Modern Art in New York City and Tate Modern and the British Film Institute in London.
