= Creation Books =

Defunct British book publisher

- Parent company: Butcherbest Ltd.
- Status: Defunct
- Founded: 1988
- Founders: Alan McGee, James Williamson
- Defunct: 2013
- Country of origin: United Kingdom
- Headquarters location: London
- Distribution: Turnaround Publishers (Europe), Consortium (United States), Marginal (Canada)
- Key people: Peter Colebrook, Laurence Raine
- Publication types: Books
- Imprints: Velvet, Attack! Books
- Official website: creationbooks.com

Creation Books (also called Creation Press) was a British, later American, book publisher. Originally founded by James Williamson and Alan McGee in 1988 as a spinoff of McGee's independent record label Creation Records, it soon branched out into being its own company. It focused on transgressive topics, particularly in the realms of erotica and film. It had two imprints: Velvet, focused on erotica topics, and the fiction imprint Attack! Books. Creation Books ceased activity in 2013 following commercial issues.

== History and activities ==
Creation Books was initially based in London, established in 1988 by Alan McGee, the owner of Creation Records, and his friend James Williamson. Neither man had any prior experience with book publishing. Creation Books's first work was not published until 1989; titled Raism, it was authored by Williamson under the pen name James Havoc.

It was established as a division of the British independent record label Creation Records, but soon was spun out into being its own company. As of 1995, its three main figures were Laurence Raine, James Williamson, and Peter Colebrook. At varying times Raine and Williamson were director of the organization, at other times being the editor. Mirand Filbee handled rights and marketing with Bradley Davis handling production.

In 1996, it opened an office in New York, headed by Michele Karlsberg, who led publicity and press for the company in the United States. By 1998 their US representative was Jack Sargeant, whose book, Deathtripping, had previously been published by Creation. It was associated with the Creation Bookstore in Los Angeles. They had their books distributed in Europe by Turnaround Publishers, by Consortium in the United States, by Marginal Distribution in Canada, by Tuttle Shokai in Japan, and by Peribo in Australia and New Zealand. Its parent company was Butcherbest Ltd.

The company later moved to New York, then to Bangkok. Creation Books ceased actively publishing in 2012 following commercial issues, with its final book being published in March 2013.

== Imprints ==
In March 1995, Creation launched an imprint, Velvet, focused on erotica topics. With the launch came six books, including books like House of Pain and The Whip Angels. The launch party included sadomasochistic performances and showing of porn movies. The imprint was aimed at publishing high-quality erotica, as opposed to what Colebrook described as "pulp rubbish", aiming for a more sophisticated but also more extreme set of ideas. Colebrook criticized existing erotica imprints like Black Lace, an imprint of Virgin Books, contrasting Velvet to those in its more extreme focus.

In 1999, it established another imprint, Attack! Books, edited by the music journalist Steven Wells and focusing on fiction, describing its focus as "avant-pulp". The imprint was short lived and not active for long; novels published tended to be on offensive subject matter and with a short length.

== Focus and books published ==
Creation Books was largely focused on shocking and transgressive topics, covering topics like the arts, film, surrealism, sexuality and erotica, and music, focusing on subcultural or music topics in addition to "nonfiction of an extreme or disturbing character". It described its goal as using books "to assemble a unique monument to the terrible sadness of the world from the human perspective". People with extreme and revolutionary focuses were a recurrent topic. By 1995 it had a backlist of about 12 books; in 1999 it had 25 new titles that year, and 30 in 2000. By 2006 it was publishing an average of 20 books a year with 93 to 100 titles in print. It was associated with the Glitter Books publishing company.

According to its directors, it was similar in orientation to the American publisher Re/Search Publications; they said that "we're so far removed from corporate publishing, that we're just completely free to do our own thing." The Washington Post wrote of their publishing that they "want[...] to shock us, to find books that get under our skin and stay there [...] most uncomfortably", considering that they "annexed territory that few others care to venture into". Scholar Mark P. Williams considered them to be a "cult publisher", with a focus on experimental works and "self-consciously internationalist avant-garde aesthetics" with "a reflexively eclectic range of classic texts". Another academic analysis considered it a "micro-publisher", unconventional even by the standards of independent labels, with a focus on niche authors and with small print runs.

Notable books published by Creation Books include Killing for Culture, a history of death film, Lips Hips Tits Power: The Films of Russ Meyer by Doyle Green, Megatherion: The Magical World of Aleister Crowley by Francis King, Ultra-Gash Inferno by Suehiro Maruo, Deathtripping, a book on transgressive cinema, Vicious: Too Fast to Live about the English musician Sid Vicious, Tits-Out Teenage Terror Totty by Steven Wells, Meatphysics by Jake Chapman, and Teradome: An Illustrated History of Freak Film. By 1995, its best-selling book was The Starry Wisdom: A Tribute to H.P. Lovecraft. Their book on snuff film was removed from sale in some stores in Ireland after police questioning. With Killing for Culture, it established the Creation Cinema book series, a series focusing on film studies.

In addition to new works, it republished or translated some older works, like The Great God Pan by Arthur Machen, Other republished works included Diary of a Genius by Salvador Dalí, the works of Pierre Guyotat, and Blood and Roses: The 19th Century Vampire by James Havoc (Williamson) and Adele Olivia Gladwell.
