= Kembra Pfahler =

American interdisciplinary artist (born 1961)

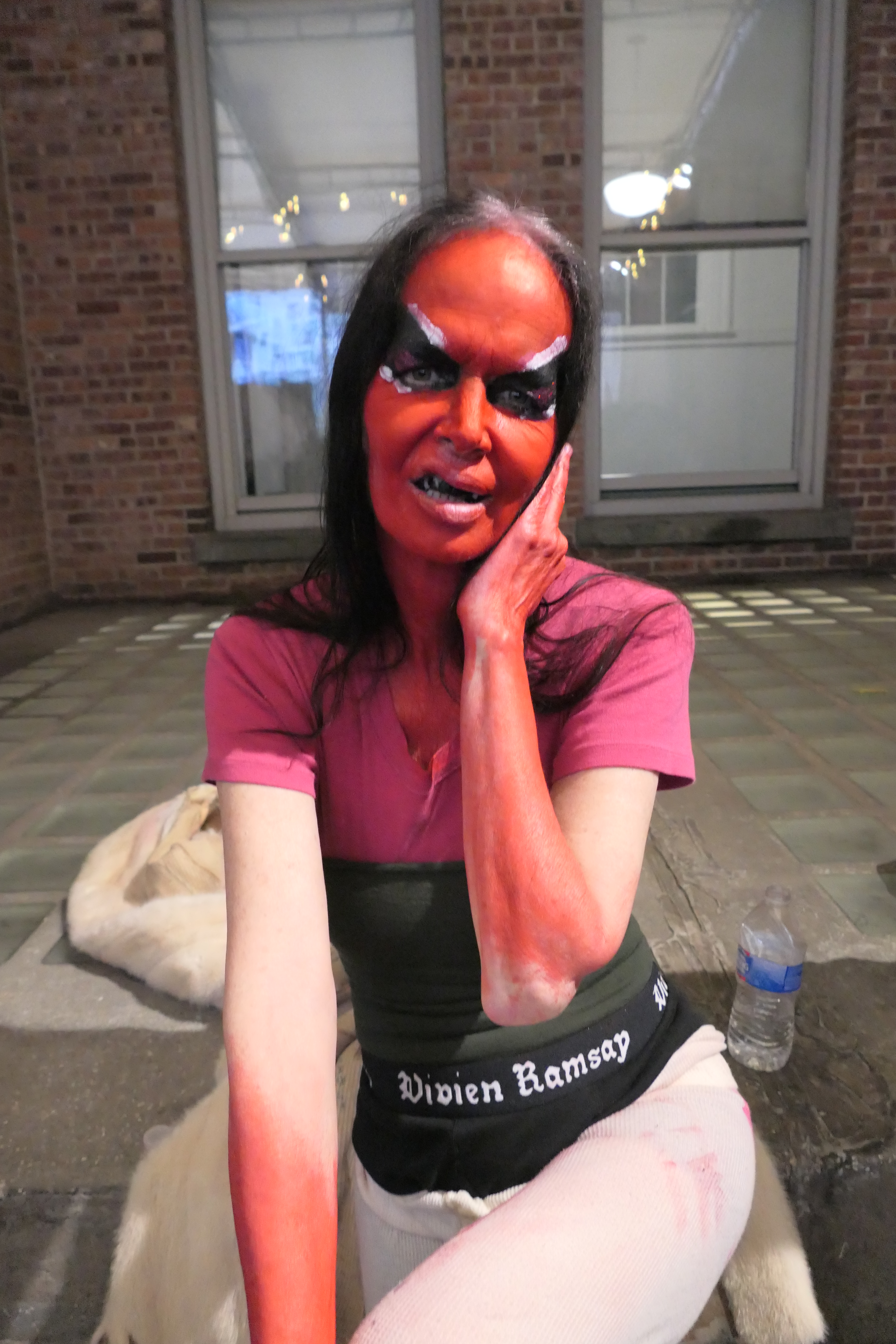
- in 2025 at MoMA PS1

Background information
- Born: August 4, 1961 (age 65); Hermosa Beach, California, U.S.
- Genres: Glam rock, punk rock, shock rock
- Occupations: interdisciplinary artist, Singer, performance artist

Kembra Pfahler (born August 4, 1961) is an American interdisciplinary artist and rock musician.She has been called the "godmother of modern day shock art".

Pfahler's film work is associated with Nick Zedd's Cinema of Transgression. As a musician, she leads the band The Voluptuous Horror of Karen Black, who are inspired by glam, punk, shock rock and the American actress Karen Black. As a visual and performance artist, Pfahler is known for self-portraits. As a result of having participated with the North-American artists Anohni, Johanna Constantine, and Bianca and Sierra Casady of CocoRosie in 2014, she co-authored 13 Tenets of Future Feminism that contains thirteen propositions engraved into rose quartz discs.

== Early life and education ==
Pfahler is the daughter of surfer Freddy Pfahler, who had appeared in the 1958 surf film Slippery When Wet, directed by Bruce Brown. Her brother is Adam Pfahler, the drummer of Jawbreaker. Growing up in Southern California, Pfahler appeared as a child actress in TV commercials for Kodak film. She went to college at the School of Visual Arts in New York City and studied under Mary Heilmann and Lorraine O'Grady.

== Career ==
Hans Ulrich Obrist described Pfahler as a 'pioneer' of the Cinema of Transgression and of performance art and 'pioneering' as a musician and actress. He has called her interdisciplinary practice a Gesamtkunstwerk. She has also been identified as a 'post-punk polymath.'

Pfahler has shown work at the Museum of Contemporary Art in Rome, The Garage Museum of Contemporary Art in Moscow, Deitch Projects, The Hole Gallery in New York, Bowman Gallery, and Kenny Schachter Rove Gallery, in London. Her drawings are in the permanent collection of the Museum of Modern Art in New York. She is currently represented by Emalin Gallery in London.

=== 1980s: East Village scene ===
Pfahler moved to New York in 1979 to attend the School of Visual Arts. In the 1980s Pfahler became involved East Village scene associated with ABC No Rio when she began performing in and creating low-budget films associated with the Cinema of Transgression. With best friend and collaborator Gordon Kurtti, Pfahler created live performances for Life Café, 8BC and Danceteria and was the lead performer in XS: The Opera Opus when performed in 1984 at the Pyramid Club. Also in 1984, Pfhaler and Kurtti organized The Extremist Show at ABC No Rio, featuring many of New York's sub-culture artists and groups including P.O.O.L., Samoa Moriki and his punk rock band BALLS, The Church of the Little Green Man, and the Cinema of Transgression featuring the underground films of Nick Zedd, Lydia Lunch and Richard Kern, Borbetomagus and Red Dog Magazine.

Pfahler stars alongside Jack Smith in Ari M. Roussimoff's Shadows in the City (1991). Pfahler, while in Europe, discovered and took inspiration from the Viennese Actionism movement, specifically Rudolf Schwarzkogler. In 1982, she moved into an apartment on the Lower East Side which she painted entirely tile red to make it look like a film set.

Also during the 1980s, Pfahler worked as a Calvin Klein model, during an advertising campaign in the heroin chic style. She appeared as a model in the photographs accompanying the article "These Children that Come at You with Knives" written by Legs McNeil and Gillian McCain in a 1999 issue of Pop Smear Magazine. In this comic-book style layout depicting the Manson Family, Pfahler played Sharon Tate alongside Maynard James Keenan as Charles Manson.

=== 1990s: The Voluptuous Horror of Karen Black and Sewing Circle ===
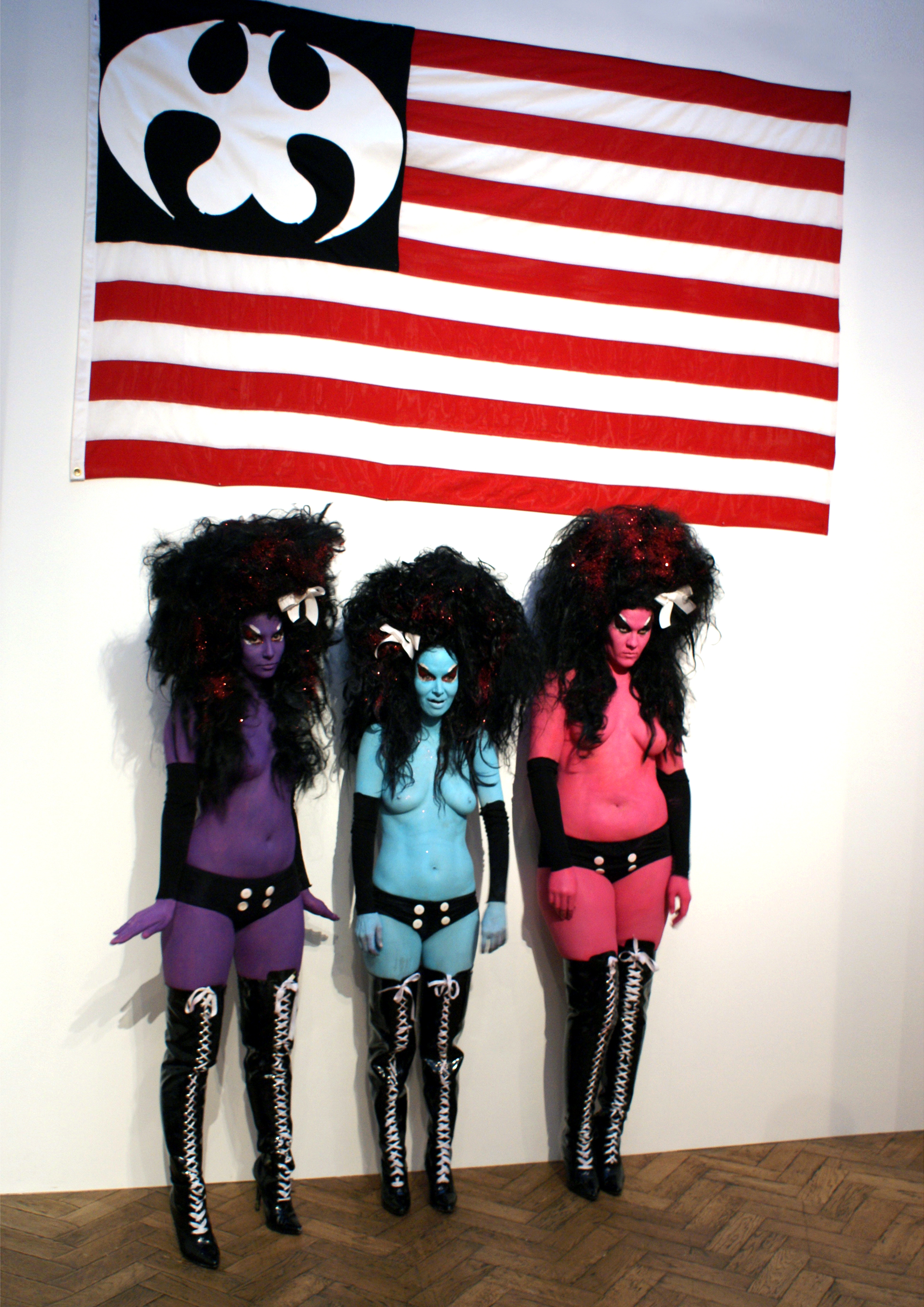
Kembra Pfahler (center) with her band at the "It's Not Only Rock'n'Roll Baby" exhibition, Bozar, Brussels, June 19, 2008

In 1990, Pfahler and Samoa Moriki, her husband at the time, founded the band The Voluptuous Horror of Karen Black (VHOKB), named in homage to actress Karen Black. They released three albums: A National Healthcare (1993); Anti-Naturalists (1995); and Black Date (1998); as well as several limited-edition presses on vinyl.

Pfahler and Samoa shot many horror films and used visual and performance art for their performances. VHOKB's live performance of The Wall of Vagina appears on Disinformation DVD – The Complete Series. VHOKB also appear on the album Virgin Voices: A Tribute to Madonna. Other performances developed at this time included walking on bowling balls and cracking paint-filled eggs on her vulva. In nearly all her performances, Pfahler appears in her signature "look": naked with monochrome body paint (most often red), knee-high black pleather boots with white laces, a huge stack of black fright wigs with bows and black teeth. She often works with the "girls of Karen Black", who dress in similar attire and support her performances.

Pfahler sang backup on the song "Shoot, Knife, Strangle, Beat and Crucify" on the album Brutality and Bloodshed for All of GG Allin and the Murder Junkies.

In Richard Kern's Sewing Circle (1992), Pfhaler had her vagina sewn shut by artist Lisa Resurreccion while only wearing a "Young Republicans" t-shirt, black stockings and garters. She repeated this performance two more times, including in 1998 for Penthouse.

=== 2000s: Art exhibitions and shows ===
In a 2005 Pfahler held a solo exhibition at Rove Projects in London. The exhibition, titled File Under V, consisted of self-portraits, performance documentation, and band props from VHOKB. In January 2007, Pfahler, with Julie Atlas Muz, curated a mixed-media art exhibition titled Womanizer at Deitch Projects. The show included works by E.V. Day, Breyer P-Orridge, Vaginal Davis, and burlesque performer Bambi the Mermaid. Her contribution was an installation with a bed set that contained a skeleton and dolls painted in multiple colors, surrounded by walls plastered with red paste, as well as a video that shows her ripping the dolls out of a birthing canal. As part of the 2008 Whitney Biennial and with support from the Art Production Fund, Pfahler and Voluptuous Horror gave a performance in the Park Avenue Armory's Drill Hall on March 14, 2008. These performances included her works Actressocracy and Whitney Live.

In 2009 alongside gallerist Kathy Grayson, Pfhaler published a photographic catalog of her work in the form of a book titled Beautalism. In these exhibitions Pfahler started creating 'butt prints' through 'sit ins' where she uses the colours of the body paint from her Karen Black costumes, inspired by Yves Klein's practice these work's create paintings via bodily action. These butt prints feature in Season 6, Episode 6 of Gossip Girl (2012).

=== 2010-Present ===
She has starred as 'Sister Kembra' in Bruce LaBruce's The Misandrists (2017) and was interviewed as part of the documentary The Advocate for Fagdom by Angélique Bosio about the queercore filmmaker.

Pfahler has held three solo shows in the UK with Emalin. In 2016, Capital Improvements recreated her apartment in the gallery and used London-based artists as the 'girls of Karen Black' including Angel Rose and Phoebe Patey-Ferguson. Rebel Without a Cock (2019), featured a giant mirror ball penis and 'mirrorballs' and a performance on roller skates and On the Record Off the Record: Sound Off (2022), consisting of new works and collages of documentation from her work in clubs in the 1980s.

In fall 2019, Pfahler walked in the Mugler Spring 2020 ready-to-wear fashion show. She has also modeled for Rick Owens, Rodarte, Marc Jacobs, and Helmut Lang.

Pfhaler performed in the window of The Hole Gallery in 2019 called Slippery When Dead, inspired by a surfer film her father was in called Slipper When Wet (1958) by Bruce Brown. The same year she played a rock in Anohni's play SHE WHO SAW BEAUTIFUL THINGS at The Kitchen, alongside her teacher Lorraine O'Grady as well as Laurie Anderson and Charles Atlas. Pfahler still regularly performs with The Voluptuous Horror of Karen Black alongside staging exhibitions and performances.

== Availabilism ==
Pfahler founded the art movement and conceptual philosophies of Availabilism (sometimes written as 'availabism'), using what is closest at hand ("available") as both the inspiration for her work and the medium of her expression. Availabilism is associated with punk and DIY movements, Pfahler has defined it as:

"Availabilism is making the best use of what's available. It has a basis in finance and commerce, although if there is money available to be used it will be used. It's not a celebration of poverty, but of abundance. It's having the willingness to be an interdisciplinary artist. In my case, performance was about using the available tools that I had, which was my body and one of my first performances, the egg piece, it was having one egg in the refrigerator."

Pfahler teaches students in how to use Availabilism through her workshops 'Performance Art 101,' which she has delivered regularly over the past two decades in New York City's East Village as well as venues including Pioneer Works and The Watermill Center. Pfahler has also taught at Bard College.

=== Other terminologies ===
Pfahler has often used word-play and portmanteaus to describe areas of her practice these include: Anti-Naturalism, to describe an aesthetic of total artificiality; Beautalism, to describe making beauty out of brutal real-life circumstances; and Yesterbating, as a critical description of nostalgia.

== Future Feminism ==
In 2011, Pfahler co-created Future Feminism alongside Anohni, Bianca and Sierra Casady (of CocoRosie), and Johanna Constantine. The group of five women stated that their aim with the project is "a call to arms to reorganize ourselves as a species and affirm archetypally feminine values." Their first group show debuted in 2014 at The Hole in New York City, most prominently featuring 13 large rose-quartz discs, each engraved with a 'tenet' of Future Feminism including: '1. The subjugation of women and the earth is one in the same,' '2. Future Feminism requires the participation of all people.' and '13. The future is female.'

The 2014 exhibition at The Hole included 13 events from various feminist artists including Marina Abramović, Carolee Schneemann, Kiki Smith, Laurie Anderson, Terence Koh, Lydia Lunch, Narcissister and Viva Ruiz. The show was re-staged at the 'O' Space gallery in Aarhus, Denmark as part of the 2017 European Capital of Culture and featured a series of debates, presentations, performances and workshops.

The group is credited with popularising the slogan 'the future is female' from 2014 onwards, which was then marketed by t-shirt companies and used by Hillary Clinton in a 2017 speech.
