= Casandra Stark =

American film director

Casandra Stark Mele Is a principal director and actor in the No wave cinema movement referred to as Cinema of Transgression. She made all her films in the 1980s and early 1990s under the name Casandra Stark. Since then, she has added her real family name Mele to her professional name.

== Life and work ==
Casandra grew up in Wallingford, Connecticut with the first name Rosanne. She is currently a dramatic vocalist and live performer as well as a painter and film maker. Her films often featured the music of one of her bands, such as Menace Dement and/or The Trees, a duo with guitarist and political scientist Frank Morales with whom Casandra has a child named Frankie.

Her film The Anarchists was aired on Manhattan Cable Television in 1992 and features the music of Missing Foundation. It was partly filmed in Naples, Italy (A city she refers to as Napoli) as well as New York. Her film Parades of Crazy ranges from very surrealistic images of people marching slowly through a park wearing masks to a beach scene in black and white of Casandra herself and her friend Laura May wearing white gowns and splashing in the waves and floating in the tide. Most of her films do not feature Casandra herself, however. She starred in the title role of her Death of an Arabian Woman film.

She has authored six chapbooks, one of which, Your World Not Mine, chronicles events in her life growing up an epileptic.

She has dedicated her talents to working with mentally challenged of the Lower East Side promoting creative outlets such as Coocooloco: An Anthology Of Creative Writings From The So-Called Mentally Ill and The Lower East Side And Beyond, a collection of poetry.

She went on to become a high school teacher in New York.
