= Nick Zedd =

American filmmaker and writer (1958–2022)

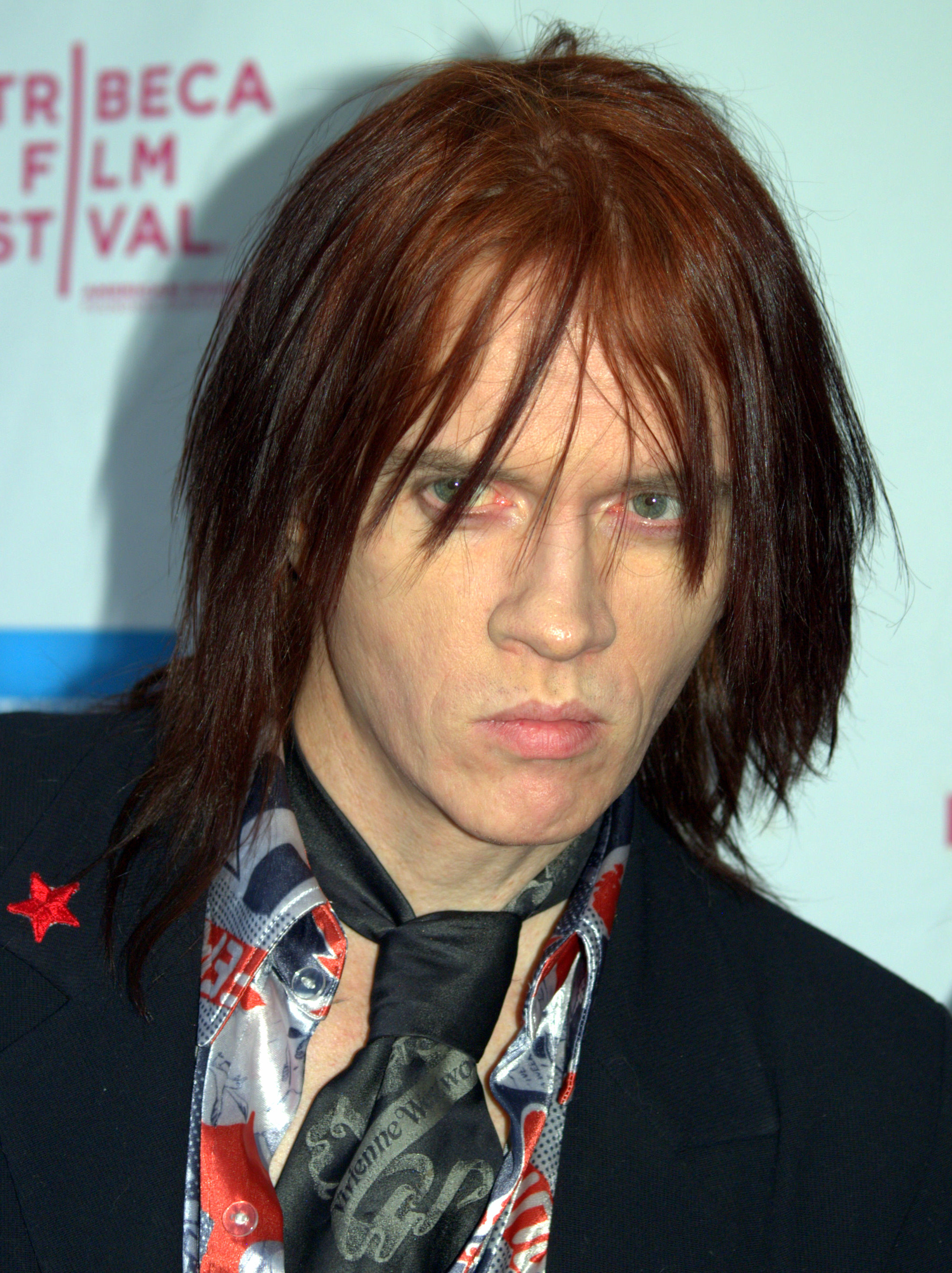
- Zedd at the 2009 Tribeca Film Festival
- Born: James Franklyn Harding III; January 25, 1956; Takoma Park, Maryland, U.S.
- Died: February 27, 2022 (aged 63); Mexico City, Mexico
- Occupations: Director; screenwriter; producer; author
- Years active: 1979–2015

Nick Zedd (né James Franklyn Harding III; January 25, 1956 – February 27, 2022) was an American filmmaker, author, and painter based in Mexico City. He coined the term Cinema of Transgression in 1985 to describe a loose-knit group of like-minded filmmakers and artists using shock value and black humor in their work. These filmmakers and artistic collaborators included Richard Kern, Tessa Hughes Freeland, Lung Leg, Kembra Pfahler, Jack Smith and Lydia Lunch. Under numerous pen names, Zedd edited and wrote the Underground Film Bulletin (1984–1990) which publicized the work of these filmmakers. The Cinema of Transgression was explored in Jack Sargeant's book Deathtripping.

== Early life ==
Zedd was born in Takoma Park, Maryland, on January 25, 1956. He said the proximity to DC gave him a political awareness. Zedd took LSD at 16, causing an "internal revolution" that changed him. Zedd first moved to Philadelphia for art school, but found the city boring. He then moved to New York in 1976 to study at the School of Visual Arts and Brooklyn's Pratt Institute, where he earned a BFA in Film.

== Career ==
Zedd started to make films in 1979, and his first film was the feature-length "They Eat Scum" about "The rise, fall and rise of a teen death-rock idol." Zedd went on to direct other super-low-budget feature-length movies, including Geek Maggot Bingo and War Is Menstrual Envy, and numerous short films. The 1983 film The Wild World of Lydia Lunch depicts the deterioration of Zedd's relationship with Lydia Lunch in London and Ireland. Zedd struggled to secure funding and distribution for his films: in the spring of 1993, he screened Geek Maggot Bingo to 15 New York-based production companies, all of whom exited before the film's ending. Zedd met Richard Kern in 1984 at a screening for Beth B, who Zedd was dating at the time. The same year, Zedd made Thrust In Me, a short film about a love suicide, with both the leads played by Zedd himself; the film was included in Richard Kern's film series Manhattan Love Suicides. Zedd's 1987 short Police State is considered "one of the best narrative movies to emerge from the Cinema of Transgression" and "the zenith of Zedd's narrative filmmaking." The film depicts the harassment and torture of a young man by sadistic cops, who serve the interests of the ruling class. His feature film War Is Menstrual Envy was produced in three parts between 1990 and 1992 and is reminiscent of the work of Kenneth Anger and Jack Smith with its psychedelic colors and campy images.

In 1985, Zedd founded the Cinema of Transgression, a film movement that grouped together New York filmmakers and actors who often collaborated, including Richard Kern, Lung Leg, Lydia Lunch, Tessa Hughes-Freeland, and Tommy Turner. Typical themes of the movement are the link between sex and death, sadistic violence, perversion and voyeurism, black comedy, rejection of family/state/religion, and madness. When asked to define the movement, Zedd offered, "Fuck you."

Additionally, Zedd acted in such low-budget movies as the Super 8 film Manhattan Love Suicides (1985), What About Me (1993), Bubblegum (1995), Jonas in the Desert (1997), Terror Firmer (1999), and Thus Spake Zarathustra (2001). He also appeared in the documentaries Llik Your Idols (2007) and Blank City (2010).

Zedd is the author of two autobiographical books, Bleed: Part One (1992) and Totem of the Depraved (1997), as well as the self-published novel From Entropy to Ecstasy (1996). He also contributed to the anthologies Up Is Up But So Is Down, Captured and Low Rent. From 1984–1990, Zedd (under the pseudonym "Orion Jeriko") published ten issues of the Underground Film Bulletin, a zine intended to promote the Cinema of Transgression. The zine intended to counter "censorship by omission," and earned the movement recognition by The Village Voice. Issue 4 contained the Cinema of Transgression Manifesto, which was also published in The Theory of Xenomorphosis (1998), and which reads: "We propose that all film schools be blown up and all boring films never be made again. We propose that a sense of humour is an essential element discarded by the doddering academics and further, that any film which doesn’t shock isn’t worth looking at. All values must be challenged. Nothing is sacred. Everything must be questioned and reassessed in order to free our minds from the faith of tradition."

In the early 1990s, Zedd toured with Lisa Crystal Carver's Suckdog Circus, exhibiting his films. Performing with experimental noise music band Zyklon Beatles, Zedd released the "Consume and Die" 7-inch single on Rubric Records in 2000.

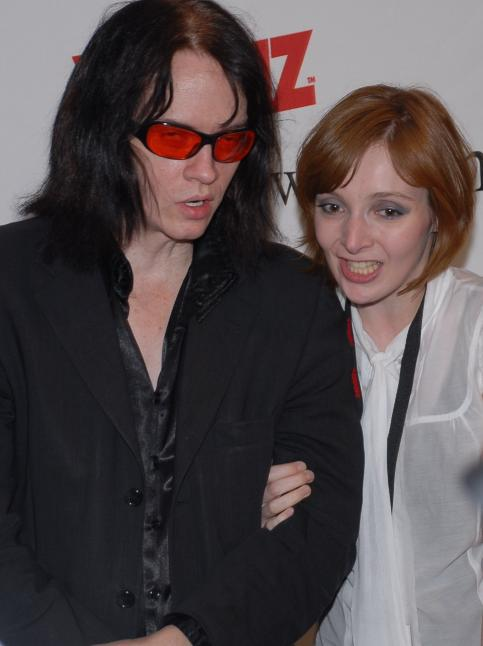
Nick Zedd and Angélique Bosio at the 2007 Erotic Film Festival

With Jen Miller, he was a co-creator of the public access series Electra Elf (2004–08), featuring New York artists and performers including Miller, Faceboy and Andrew J. Lederer. He served as director of photography on another TV series called Chop Chop (2007), produced by Nate Hill.

Into his 40s, Zedd held a series of odd jobs to pay the bills: working as a clerk and bouncer at a gay-porn store, driving food trucks on movie sets, DJing at burlesque clubs, and VJing at a Bulgarian bar. By the 2000s, Zedd was also regularly screening films at Anthology Film Archives and selling DVDs on his website.

After exhibiting oil paintings in 2010 at the ADA and Pendu galleries, Zedd presented a major retrospective of films, videos, and paintings at the Microscope Gallery in Brooklyn.

In 2012, he attended a retrospective of his films at the eighth Berlin International Directors Lounge and exhibited work at the KW Institute for Contemporary Art in the same city.

In 2013, Zedd published The Extremist Manifesto, an essay denouncing contemporary art and the class structure that promotes it while announcing the emergence of the Extremist Art movement in Mexico City, which sought to subvert the edicts of established art institutions and curatorial ideologues. This manifesto, first released online, then in a self-published Hatred of Capitalism magazine issued in Mexico City (in English and Spanish) was reprinted a year later by the Museo Universitario del Chopo, along with two more issues as part of the Fanzinoteka exhibition. At a screening at the New Museum in New York, Zedd was presented with the Acker Award for Lifetime Achievement, a tribute given to "members of the avant garde arts community who have made outstanding contributions in their discipline in defiance of convention, or else served their fellow writers and artists in outstanding ways". In 2014, Zedd exhibited three motion pictures at the Museum of Modern Art in New York as part of a posthumous retrospective of films by Christoph Schlingensief, who had cited Zedd as a major influence on his work. Later in 2014, Zedd presented his first public exhibition of paintings in Mexico City, in a group show curated by Aldo Flores at Salon des Aztecas Gallery in Coyoacán. In 2015, Zedd presented his first one-man show of paintings at the V&S Gallery in Mexico City. Zedd also shot an 8mm short entitled Paradise Lost, which was featured in the anthology film Impression X (2023).

== Personal life and death ==
An outsider artist throughout his life, Zedd never enjoyed commercial success with his films. By the mid-1980s, he regularly resorted to side hustles (such as being a taxi driver), to make ends meet. Peter LeVasseur, Zedd's acquaintance at the time and a former East Village squatter, suggests that he contracted hepatitis C, during that period, from intravenous drug use. "It had to be from intravenous drug use," LeVasseur says. "He seemed to be on heroin and coke — both were fashionable at the time, the combo. This was when he was at his deepest, worst part. The pallor, his eyes and sunken cheeks. If you got in his car you'd be afraid". During the same period, Zedd sometimes experimented with walking around the Village in drag.

In 2010, Zedd sold his archives to NYU's Fales Library. The sale helped to fund his move to Mexico City the following year with Monica Casanova, a Mexican artist. In Mexico City, Zedd painted, taught English and film, and planned to make a feature-length film.

Zedd died from complications from cirrhosis of the liver, cancer, and hepatitis C, in Mexico City, on February 27, 2022, at the age of 66. He was survived by his partner of 15 years, Monica Casanova, as well as a son and a step-daughter.

== Legacy ==
Founder of the Cinema of Transgression movement and part of the late 1970s and early 1980s No Wave group of underground filmmakers in New York City's Lower East Side, Zedd exerted a significant influence over a number of directors, from Christoph Schlingensief to Quentin Tarantino. The latter paid tribute to him in his Palme d'Or-winning film, Pulp Fiction (1994), naming the main antagonist of the "Gold Watch" chapter Zed [sic].

Legendary cult filmmaker John Waters, who was as much a fan of Zedd's lurid and provocative style, as Zedd was of his camp classics, like Pink Flamingos, wrote: "Nick Zedd makes violent, perverted art films from Hell—he's my kind of director!", and he considered the title of his debut film, They Eat Scum, as his favorite in cinema history. Similarly, fellow-East Village independent filmmaker Jim Jarmusch said that "Nick Zedd's films are legendary — he is a truly seminal figure in the New York underground".

== Filmography ==
- They Eat Scum (1979)
- The Bogus Man (1980), short
- Geek Maggot Bingo (1983)
- The Wild World of Lydia Lunch (1983), short
- Totem of the Depraved (1983), short, co-directed with Ela Troyano
- Thrust in Me (1984), short featured in Manhattan Love Suicides (1985)
- School of Shame (1984)
- Kiss Me Goodbye (1986), short
- Go to Hell (1986), short
- Police State (1987), short
- Whoregasm (1988), short
- War Is Menstrual Envy (1992)
- Smiling Faces Tell Lies (1995), short
- Why Do You Exist (1998)
- Tom Thumb in the Land of the Giants (1999), short
- Ecstasy in Entropy (1999), short
- Abnormal: The Sinema of Nick Zedd (2001), video
- I of K9 (2001), short
- Elf Panties: The Movie (2001), video
- Lord of the Cockrings (2001), video
- Thus Spake Zarathustra (2001), co-directed with Jon Vomit
- I Was a Quality of Life Violation (2002), short
- Electra Elf: Dance With the Devil (2003)
- Electra Elf: Maggot on a Hot Tin Roof (2003)
- Electra Elf: Old Man & the Sea Monkey (2003)
- Electra Elf: Great Shrunken Expectations (2004)
- Electra Elf: Roof Party (2004)
- Electra Elf: I, Nauseous (2004)
- Electra Elf: Hellbound Heiresses (2004)
- Electra Elf: Deadly Little Trees (2005)
- Electra Elf: Triumph of the Ill (2005)
- Electra Elf: Of Lice and Men (2005)
- Electra Elf: The Beginning Parts One & Two (2005), video
- Electra Elf: Don't Worry Bee Happy (2006)
- Electra Elf: Vile Buddies (2006)
- Electra Elf: Battle of the Bands (2006)
- Electra Elf: No Plague Like Home (2007)
- Filthy Rich (2007)
- Electra Elf: We All Scream for Ice Cream (2007)
- Electra Elf: Behind the Scenes (2007)
- Mistakes Hapen (2007)
- Electra Elf: Hollow Be Thy Name (2007)
- Electra Elf: Goin to the Chapel (2007)
- Electra Elf: Gone with the Mind (2008)
- NYC/MEXICO (2011)
- The Birth of Zerak (2011), short documentary
- Paintings 2009-11 (2011)
- Frustration/Dr. Shinto (2011)
- Cockfight (2012)
- El Manifiesto Extremista (2013)
- Demonic Sweaters: Love Always Love (2014), music video
- The Death of Muffinhead (2016), short
- Attack of the Particle Disruptors (2016), short
- Demonica (2017), short
- Eclipse of the Ectoparasite (2017), short
- Werewolf Bitches from Outer Space (2017), additional scenes director
- Vive Libre (I'm Not Afraid of You) (2018), music video for Los Congoleños
- The Reckoning (2019)
- Impression X (2023), segment "Paradise Lost"
