= Sasse Museum of Art =

Nonprofit art museum in California

- Established: 2015
- Location: 300 Thomas Street Pomona, California 91766
- Coordinates: 34.1117°N 117.6806°W
- Type: Art Museum
- Director: Gene Sasse
- Website: sasseartmuseum.org

The Sasse Museum of Art, formerly known as the Inland Empire Museum of Art (IEMA), was founded 2015 in as a nonprofit art museum located in Pomona, California. The museum relies on donations and public support.

== History ==
In 2015 the museum was in search of a permanent location. The museum sought a location near Rancho Cucamonga because of its proximity to Los Angeles. The museum eventually found a location in Upland California. It is now based in Pomona, California, part of the Inland Empire, a metropolitan area situated directly east of the Los Angeles metropolitan area.

The museum in 2022 has moved to Pomona at 300 South Thomas Street; Pomona California 91766 located in the Progress Building in the basement level.
