= Cinema of Transgression =

Underground film movement

The Cinema of Transgression is a term coined by Nick Zedd in 1985 to describe a New York City–based underground film movement, consisting of a loose-knit group of artists using shock value and black humor in their films. Key players in this movement were Zedd, Kembra Pfahler, Tessa Hughes-Freeland, Casandra Stark, Beth B, Tommy Turner, Jon Moritsugu, Manuel DeLanda, David Wojnarowicz, Richard Kern, and Lydia Lunch, who in the late 1970s and mid-1980s began to make very low-budget films using cheap 8 mm cameras.

Zedd outlined his philosophy on the Cinema of Transgression in The Cinema of Transgression Manifesto, published under the name Orion Jeriko in the zine The Underground Film Bulletin (1984–90).

Cinema of Transgression continues to influence underground filmmakers. In 2000, the British Film Institute showed a retrospective of the movement's work introduced by those involved in the production of the original video films.

== List of notable films ==
- Raw Nerves: A Lacanian Thriller (Manuel DeLanda, 1980)
- You Killed Me First (Richard Kern, 1985)
- Where Evil Dwells (David Wojnarowicz and Tommy Turner, 1985)
- Mommy, Mommy, Where's My Brain? (Jon Moritsugu, 1986)
- Wrecked on Cannibal Island (Casandra Stark, 1986)
- Stigmata (Beth B, 1991)
- Nymphomania (Tessa Hughes-Freeland and Holly Adams, 1993)
- Tromeo and Juliet (Lloyd Kaufman, 1996)
- Why Do You Exist (Nick Zedd, 1998)
- Llik Your Idols (Angélique Bosio, 2007)
- Blank City (Celine Danhier, 2009)

== See also ==
- Cinema of the world
- No Wave Cinema
- Transgressive art
- Extreme cinema
- Vulgar auteurism
