= Debbie Harry filmography =

American singer and actress

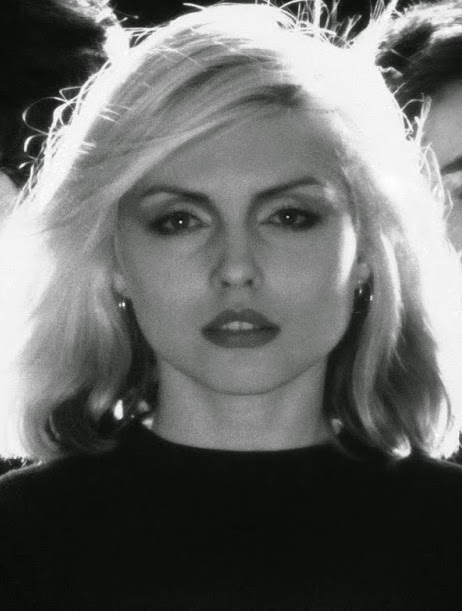
Harry in 1977

Debbie Harry is an American singer and actress who first came to prominence as the lead vocalist of the rock band Blondie in the late 1970s. She subsequently began appearing in art films for Amos Poe, like The Foreigner, before having her first leading role in the neo-noir film Union City (1980). She next starred opposite James Woods in David Cronenberg's body horror film Videodrome (1983), and had a supporting role in Forever, Lulu (1987). She garnered further notice for her role as Velma Von Tussle in John Waters's satirical dance film Hairspray (1988).

In the 1990s, Harry occasionally starred in independent films, including two films directed by James Mangold, Heavy (1995) and Cop Land (1997). In the 2000s, Harry continued to appear in supporting roles in independent features, with roles in Deuces Wild, Spun (both 2002), and My Life Without Me (2003). In 2008, she appeared in a minor part in Elegy.

In addition to film, Harry has appeared in several television series, including Tales from the Darkside (1987), The Adventures of Pete & Pete (1992), the animated series Phantom 2040 (1994–1995), and Sabrina the Teenage Witch (1996).

== Filmography ==
Key
| † | Denotes works that have not yet been released |

=== Film ===
| Year | Title | Role | Notes | Ref. |
|---|---|---|---|---|
| 1975 | Deadly Hero | Singer | Uncredited; appears alongside Chris Stein | |
| 1976 | Unmade Beds | Blondie | | |
| 1978 | The Foreigner | Dee Trik | | |
| 1980 | Union City | Lillian | | |
| 1980 | Roadie | Herself | | |
| 1981 | Downtown 81 | Fairy godmother | | |
| 1982 | Wild Style | Herself | Segment: "The Party" | |
| 1983 | Videodrome | Nicki Brand | | |
| 1984 | Rock & Rule | Angel (singing voice) | | |
| 1984 | Terror in the Aisles | Nicki Brand | Archival footage | |
| 1987 | Forever, Lulu | Lulu | | |
| 1988 | Satisfaction | Tina | | |
| 1988 | Hairspray | Velma Von Tussle | | |
| 1989 | New York Stories | Girl at Blind Alley | Segment: "Life Lessons" | |
| 1990 | Tales from the Darkside: The Movie | Betty | Segment: "The Wraparound Story" | |
| 1990 | Mother Goose Rock 'n' Rhyme | Old Woman Who Lived in a Shoe | Television film | |
| 1991 | The Real Story of O Christmas Tree | Anneka (voice) | Short film | |
| 1991 | Intimate Stranger | Cory Wheeler | Television film | |
| 1993 | Body Bags | The Nurse | Television film; segment: "Hair" | |
| 1994 | Rakthavira | Narrator | Short film | |
| 1994 | Dead Beat | Mrs. Kurtz | | |
| 1995 | Heavy | Delores | | |
| 1995 | Sandman | —N/a | Short film | |
| 1996 | Drop Dead Rock | Thor Sturmundrang | | |
| 1997 | Cop Land | Delores the bartender | | |
| 1997 | Six Ways to Sunday | Kate Odum | | |
| 1997 | L.A. Johns | Madam "Jacq" Jacqueline | Television film | |
| 1998 | Joe's Day | —N/a | | |
| 1999 | Zoo | Dorothy, the waitress | | |
| 2000 | Red Lipstick | Ezmeralda | | |
| 2001 | The Fluffer | Marcella | | |
| 2002 | Deuces Wild | Wendy | | |
| 2002 | Spun | Neighbor | | |
| 2002 | All I Want | Ma Mabley | | |
| 2003 | My Life Without Me | Ann's mother | | |
| 2003 | A Good Night to Die | Madison | | |
| 2003 | The Tulse Luper Suitcases Part 1: The Moab Story | Fastidieux | | |
| 2005 | Honey Trap | The Lawyer | Short film | |
| 2005 | Patch | Belinda | Short film | |
| 2005 | I Remember You Now... | Margaret | Short film | |
| 2006 | Full Grown Men | Beauty | | |
| 2007 | Anamorph | Neighbor | | |
| 2008 | Elegy | Amy O'Hearn | | |
| 2009 | The Mystery of Claywoman | Simone | Short film | |
| 2011 | Pipe Dreams | Norah | Short film | |
| 2012 | Believe the Magic | Herself | Short film | |
| 2014 | River of Fundament | Singing wake guest | | |
| 2018 | Bad Reputation | Herself | Documentary film | |
| 2019 | Deborah Harry Does Not Like Interviews | Herself | Documentary film | |
| TBA | A Company of Thieves † | TBA | Post-production | |

=== Television ===
| Year | Title | Role | Notes | Ref. |
|---|---|---|---|---|
| 1980 | The Muppet Show | Herself | Episode: "Debbie Harry" | |
| 1981 | Saturday Night Live | Host | Season 6, Episode 10 | |
| 1987 | Saturday Night Live | Musical Guest | Season 12, Episode 9 | |
| 1987 | Andy Warhol's 15 Minutes | Herself | Episode 4 | |
| 1987 | Crime Story | Bambi | Episode: "Top of the World" | |
| 1987 | Tales from the Darkside | Sybil | Episode: "The Moth" | |
| 1989 | Wiseguy | Diana Price | 3 episodes | |
| 1991 | Monsters | Dr. Moss | Episode: "Desirable Alien" | |
| 1992 | The Adventures of Pete & Pete | Neighbor | Episode: "New Year's Pete" | |
| 1993 | TriBeCa | Cat | Episode: "The Loft" | |
| 1994–1995 | Phantom 2040 | Vaingloria (voice) | 10 episodes | |
| 1996 | Sabrina the Teenage Witch | Cassandra | Episode: "Pilot" | |
| 2002 | Absolutely Fabulous | Herself | Episode: "Gay" | |
| 2015–2016 | Difficult People | Kiki | 2 episodes | |
| 2016 | RuPaul's Drag Race | Herself (guest judge) | Episode: "New Wave Queens" | |
| 2020 | High Fidelity | Herself | Episode: "What Fucking Lily Girl?" | |

== Video games ==
| Year | Title | Role | Notes | Ref. |
|---|---|---|---|---|
| 1993 | Double Switch | Elizabeth | Live action | |
| 2002 | Grand Theft Auto: Vice City | Doris | Voice | |
