= No wave cinema =

American film movement from the 1970s and 1980s

No Wave Cinema
- Years active: 1976–1987
- Location: United States
- Influences: American independent film; French New Wave; American underground film

No wave cinema was an underground filmmaking movement that flourished on the Lower East Side of New York City from about 1976 to 1987. Associated with (and partially sponsored by) the artists’ group Collaborative Projects, no wave cinema was a stripped-down style of guerrilla filmmaking that emphasized a dark, edgy atmosphere and unrehearsed immediacy above many other artistic concerns – similar to the parallel no wave music movement in its raw and rapid style.

== Prominent figures ==
No wave cinema, also known as New Cinema (after a short-lived screening room on St. Mark’s Place run by several filmmakers on the scene), had a significant impact on underground film. They were influenced by the works of Andy Warhol, John Cassavetes, George Kuchar, Ron Rice, John Waters and Jack Smith. The No wave cinema of Amos Poe, Michael Oblowitz, Tina L'Hotsky, Scott B and Beth B, Eric Mitchell, Jamie Nares, Diego Cortez and others helped spawn a new generation of independent filmmaking in New York that included Jim Jarmusch, Tom DiCillo, Steve Buscemi, and Vincent Gallo, as well as the Cinema of Transgression movement of Richard Kern, Nick Zedd, Tommy Turner, Tessa Hughes-Freeland and others. Other filmmakers associated with No wave cinema included Lizzie Borden, Bradley Eros, Aline Mare, Jeanne Liotta, Charlie Ahearn, Coleen Fitzgibbon, David Wojnarowicz, Manuel DeLanda, Vivienne Dick, Susan Seidelman, Kathryn Bigelow, Gordon Stevenson, and Bette Gordon.

In 1978, Jamie Nares released a well-known no wave Super 8 film titled Rome '78, her only venture into feature-length, plot-driven film. Despite its large cast in period costumes, the work was not intended as a serious undertaking, as the actors interject self-conscious laughter into scenes and deliver seemingly improvised lines with over-the-top bravado. The film features No wave cinema regular Lydia Lunch, along with Eric Mitchell, James Chance, John Lurie, Judy Rifka, Jim Sutcliffe, Lance Loud, Mitch Corber, Patti Astor, David McDermott, and Kristian Hoffman, among others.

Coleen Fitzgibbon and Alan W. Moore created an 11:41-minute film in 1978 (finished in 2009) of a no wave concert to benefit Colab called X Magazine Benefit, documenting performances of DNA, James Chance and the Contortions, and Boris Policeband in NYC in the late 1970s. Shot in black and white Super 8mm and edited on video, the film captures the gritty look and sound of the music scene during that era. In 2013, it was exhibited at Salon 94, an art gallery in New York City.

=== List of notable No wave films ===
- The Blank Generation (1976)
- Unmade Beds (1976)
- X-Terminator (1977)
- Rome '78 (1978)
- Black Box (1978)
- The Foreigner (1978)
- Minus Zero (1979)
- They Eat Scum (1979)
- The Driller Killer (1979)
- Permanent Vacation (1980)
- Time Square (1980)
- Underground U.S.A. (1980)
- The Offenders (1980)
- Stiletto (1981)
- Ms. 45 (1981)
- The Loveless (1981)
- Vortex (1982)
- King Blank (1982)
- Liquid Sky (1982)
- Smithereens (1982)
- Wild Style (1982)
- Born in Flames (1983)
- Alphabet City (1984)
- Mutable Fire (1984)
- Stranger Than Paradise (1984)
- Variety (1984)
- The Way It Is or Eurydice in the Avenues (1985)
- Working Girls (1986)
- Window on Your Present (1988)
- Ecstatic Stigmatic (1980)

== Legacy ==
Like the later Dogme 95 creative movement, No Wave Cinema has been described as a defining period in low budget film production.

Stranger Than Paradise was inducted into the National Film Registry in 2002.

In 2010, French filmmaker Céline Danhier created a documentary film titled Blank City. The film presents an oral history of the no wave cinema and Cinema of Transgression movements through interviews with Jarmusch, Kern, Buscemi, Poe, Seidelman, Ahearn, Zedd, John Waters, Blondie’s Debbie Harry, hip-hop legend Fab 5 Freddy, Thurston Moore of Sonic Youth, and writer Jack Sargeant. The soundtrack includes music by Patti Smith, Television, Richard Hell & The Voidoids, James Chance and the Contortions, Bush Tetras and Sonic Youth.

In 2011, the Museum of Arts and Design celebrated the movement with the retrospective "No Wave Cinema", which included works by Jarmusch, Kern, Mitchell, Poe, Zedd, Scott B and Beth B, Lizzie Borden, Edo Bertoglio and Kembra Pfahler.

In 2017, the Museum of Modern Art presented the exhibition Club 57: Film, Performance, and Art in the East Village, 1978–1983, which included screenings of several rarely seen but notable No wave films. Filmmakers included Michael Oblowitz, Ann Magnuson, Beth B, M. Henry Jones, John Ahearn, Michael Holman, and Tom Rubnitz, among others.

In 2023, the No Wave movement, including No Wave Cinema, received institutional recognition at the Centre Pompidou in Paris with a Nicolas Ballet curated exhibition entitled Who You Staring At: Culture visuelle de la scène no wave des années 1970 et 1980 (Visual culture of the no wave scene in the 1970s and 1980s). Featured in the installation was Scott B and Beth B's 11 minute film Letters to Dad. An interview with Beth B, No Wave film screenings and musical performances, and three recorded conversations with No Wave artists were included as part of the exhibition.

In 2026, following the death of pioneering No wave filmmaker, Amos Poe a month earlier, Metrograph curated an exhibition entitled Amos Poe and No Wave Cinema. The program featured several of Poe's classics, such as The Blank Generation, Unmade Beds, and The Foreigner, as well as later works such as Empire II. Other films screened included Susan Seidelman's Smithereens, Bette Gordon's Variety, and Midnight Coffee, directed by Poe protégé Jaime Levinas. Also included was the rarely seen No wave film Stiletto, directed by Melvie Arslanian. The film is notable for starring Poe in a leading role and its cinematography by Michael Oblowitz, who made the second No wave cinema film.

== See also ==
- Cinema of the world
- Experimental film
- Grindhouse
- Vulgar auteurism
