= Eric Mitchell (filmmaker) =

French-born American actor, writer, and director

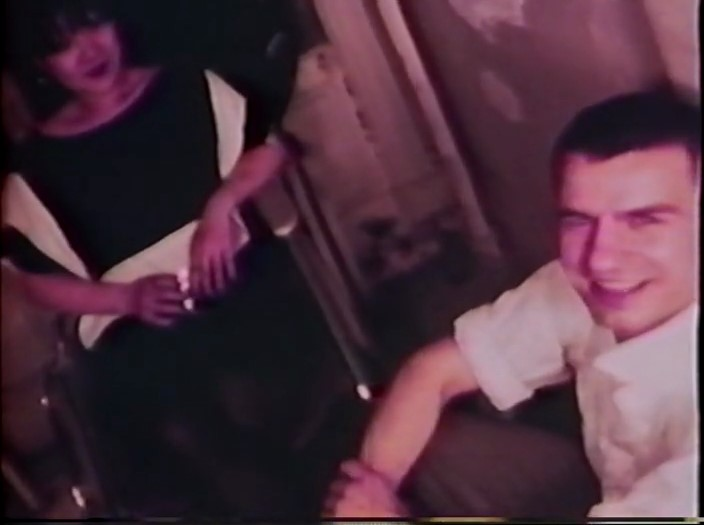
- Eric Mitchell looking at the camera in his 1978 film Kidnapped
- Born: France
- Occupations: No Wave film director, screenwriter, actor, illustrator

Eric Mitchell is a French born American writer, director, and actor who moved to downtown New York City in the early 1970s. He has acted in many No Wave films such as Permanent Vacation (1980) by Jim Jarmusch, but is best known for his own films that are usually written and directed by him: Kidnapped, Red Italy, Underground U.S.A. and The Way It Is or Eurydice in the Avenues, starring Steve Buscemi, Vincent Gallo, Mark Boone Junior, and Rockets Redglare. Mitchell worked out of New York City's sordid East Village area in conjunction with Colab's X Motion Picture Magazine and other performance artists and noise musicians. There he created a series of scruffy, deeply personal, short Super 8mm and 16mm films in which he combined darkly sinister images to explore the manner in which the individual is constrained by society.

== Early life ==
Mitchell came of age in the French art world, as his father, artist Luc Simon, was companion of painter Françoise Gilot between her marriage to Picasso and her subsequent marriage to Jonas Salk. Mitchell himself began to work, as a teenager, as an assistant photographer on the French magazine Lui, shooting with leading glamour models of the day.

== Performance and music ==
In the mid-1970s, Mitchell mounted several multi-media events at The Kitchen in New York that were documented by Jimmy De Sana. With fellow artist Martin Kippenberger, Mitchell released the punk rock single Luxus in 1979.

== Acting ==
Mitchell has acted in Permanent Vacation (1980) by Jim Jarmusch and in Amos Poe's no wave classics Unmade Beds (1976) and The Foreigner (1978), where he plays a young Frenchman in New York that is hotly pursued up and down the busy streets of New York City by thugs. Along the way he encounters a couple of bizarre young women (a new wave songstress delivering a rendition of Bertolt Brecht's Bilbao Song and a sadist). Mitchell also performs in the films J'ai vu tuer Ben Barka (I Saw Ben Barka Get Killed) (2005) by Serge Le Péron and Saïd Smihi, Minus Zero (1979) by Michael Oblowitz, Men in Orbit (1979) by John Lurie, The Scenic Route (1978) by Mark Rappaport, Candy Mountain (1987) by Robert Frank and Rudy Wurlitzer, and in James Nares's no wave film farce Rome '78 (1978), among others.

== Artwork ==
As a lifelong painter, draughtsman, and illustrator, Mitchell had a retrospective exhibition of his work called Call It Nothing in 2006 at Mitchell Algus Gallery in Chelsea, Manhattan and has had his work featured in The New Yorker and the Bergdorf Goodman Magazine.

== Film style ==
During the late 1970s to early 1980s, Mitchell was among the most significant proponents of the punk art bohemian style of No Wave Cinema. This low-budget style of underground punk filmmaking concerned itself with the art theory issues of neo-expressionism and simulation that were then typical of an emerging postmodernism.

Rising from the ashes of a bankrupt and destitute 1970's Manhattan, and reacting to the Modernist aesthetic of 1960's avant-garde film, No Wave filmmakers like Mitchell embraced their brand of DIY vanguard movie making. Inspired by the films of Jack Smith, Andy Warhol, Michelangelo Antonioni, Pier Paolo Pasolini, John Waters and The French New Wave; Mitchell's films combined elements of documentary and loose narrative structure, somewhat like the methods of Jean-Luc Godard, with stark, at times confrontational, visual imagery. Much like the No Wave music of the period (from which the movement garnered its label), Mitchell pillaged the nascent East Village, Manhattan art scene for co-conspirators, like Lydia Lunch, James Chance, Debbie Harry, Richard Hell, Patti Astor, Vincent Gallo, John Lurie, Steve Buscemi, Nan Goldin, Cookie Mueller and many others.

Mitchell's fast and cheap mindset was catalyzed by these collaborations and the New York post-punk music and punk visual art scene. Mitchell's influential stylist neo-film noir films were showcased at Colab's New Cinema on Astor Place and at punk rock venues like the Mudd Club, CBGB and Tier 3.

== Films ==
=== Kidnapped ===
Kidnapped (1978), his first feature, took on political terrorism, recasting it in the form of a group improvisation for jaded, aimless bohemian types. The deadpan acting style the actors indulge in owes much to the work of Rainer Werner Fassbinder and Andy Warhol. Indeed, Kidnapped was inspired by Vinyl (1965), a black-and-white experimental film directed by Warhol at The Factory starring Gerard Malanga, Edie Sedgwick and Ondine – an early adaptation of Anthony Burgess' novel A Clockwork Orange. In Kidnapped, Mitchell, Anya Phillips and Gordon Stevenson hang around a cramped lower east side apartment. Coolly, they talk with each other (often reading directly off the script that has been taped to the wall) and dance and fight with each other as the no wave music of Teenage Jesus and the Jerks plays on the stereo within the movie set. Like in a Warhol film, oftentimes nothing much happens in the plot, until towards the end the players go and kidnap Mudd Club owner Steve Mass and abuse him.

=== Red Italy ===
Jaded political satire also figured in Mitchell's next Super 8mm black and white 60-minute feature, Red Italy (1979). Here the actor-director created a tongue-in-cheek parody/homage to Italian Neorealism film. Pier Paolo Pasolini's 1961 Accattone is directly quoted in a scene. It tells a story of a lost post-war generation through a small cast of participants (supposedly in Rome) that include a black American soldier (played by Tom Wright), a Czech hipster (played by Harald Vogl) in love with Monica, and the "Italian" Gino (played by Eric Mitchell himself). Gino is a young disillusioned Communist rock music singer who is a daytime Fiat factory worker living a bohemian life at night. He sings and dances to a version of the Gene Vincent song Be-Bop-a-Lula. The film's co-star is a glamour-ridden jaded starlet named Monica, played by Jennifer Miro, who in actuality was a member of the San Francisco punk rock band The Nuns. Cameo performances are given by Patti Astor, Rene Ricard, James Nares, Scott Wardell, John Lurie (of the Lounge Lizards) and Arto Lindsay (of the seminal no wave band DNA). The musical soundtrack is provided mainly by the surf rock music by the American instrumental pop group The Marketts and two uncredited Twist songs, that are danced to.

Red Italy is supposedly set in Rome but was actually shot at "Italian movie'"-type locations in New York City, including the rides at Coney Island, an espresso bar, an Italian restaurant in Little Italy, Manhattan, and a vacant lot. Much of it is shot in a car. During conversation, references are made to Eddie Cochran, Samuel Fuller, Nicholas Ray, Norman Mailer and the painter Bernard Buffet. A poster of a painting of Mao Zedong by Andy Warhol is used as a set devise that subverts the early 60s time period and gives the film a postmodern feel. Mitchell has called his movie "a portrait of a bored, disenchanted woman in post-war Italy." Indeed, disillusion and boredom are Mitchell's major themes in Red Italy, which connects it to the 1975 Italian film The Passenger by Michelangelo Antonioni, but Mitchell also touches on the themes of Fascism, Communism, Americanization, Class conflict and love. Following Red Italy, boredom as an emotional stance is maintained and explored throughout most of Eric Mitchell's no wave films. Red Italy benefited from a grant from Artists Space and has been preserved by the Museum of Modern Art in New York City.

=== Underground U.S.A. ===
In 1980, Eric Mitchell directed, wrote and starred in one of the most ambitious films of the No Wave movement, Underground U.S.A. (16mm, 85 min). Made for $25,000 (considered by no-wave standards a big budget), written in two days and created in three weeks, Underground U.S.A. featured Patti Astor as Vicky, an aging actress who still thinks of herself as young and attractive and, in her vulnerability, falls for a hustler named Victor (played by Mitchell). Even with cinematography by Tom DiCillo, sound by Jim Jarmusch, editing by J.P. Roland-Levy and the authentic locations of the Lower East Side art scene, the film was not a huge commercial success, but did succeed in bringing in a whole new audience to No Wave Cinema. It challenged both commercial movie making and the avant-garde with a style that combined amateur enthusiasm with sophisticated visual know-how and a sharp sense of social and political observation diametrically opposite of the staid formalism of the experimental film establishment. But while paying generous tribute to the Warhol era (the cast is filled with Warhol veterans like Jackie Curtis and Taylor Mead) Mitchell's approach is never nostalgic. "No More '60s, No More '70s" reads the actor-director's press release for the film. When the 16mm film was first released in 1980, it ran for six months at Colab sponsored St Mark's Cinema and since has received a Cineprobe screening at MoMA, was broadcast on Independent Focus, Channel 13 and aired on BBC's Channel 4. Soon after, MoMA acquired a brand new print for its collection which was screened in the series "Looking at Music" that was curated by Barbara London. Underground U.S.A. has cameo performances by Cookie Mueller, Jackie Curtis, Taylor Mead, Steve Mass, John Lurie, Rene Ricard and Duncan Smith.

=== The Way It Is or Eurydice in the Avenues ===
The Way It Is or Eurydice in the Avenues (1985) stars Steve Buscemi, Vincent Gallo, Rockets Redglare, and Mark Boone Junior. In this 80 minute film, a group of actors have been rehearsing Jean Cocteau's Orpheus in the East Village. On a warm summer day, the body of Eurydice, the lead actress, is found dead in Tompkins Square Park. At her funeral, the actors, each a suspect, examine their relationships with her to unravel the mystery of her demise. The actors' memories, the underworld of Cocteau's play, and the East Village milieu become inextricably linked. The tragedy of Eurydice plays against the end of an era: scorched tenements, the Mudd Club, and punk rock.
