= Underground U.S.A. =

- Directed by: Eric Mitchell
- Written by: Eric Mitchell
- Based on: Sunset Boulevard and Heat
- Produced by: Eric Mitchell
- Starring: Eric Mitchell; Patti Astor; Rene Ricard; Jackie Curtis; Taylor Mead; Cookie Mueller; Tom Wright; John Lurie
- Distributed by: New Line Cinema
- Release date: May 1980
- Running time: 85 minutes
- Country: United States
- Language: English

Underground U.S.A. is a 1980 American No Wave underground film directed by Eric Mitchell starring Patti Astor, Rene Ricard, Jackie Curtis, Cookie Mueller, Steve Mass, Tom Wright, Ronnie Cutrone, John Lurie, David Armstrong, and Taylor Mead. Tom DiCillo was the director of photography. Set design was by sculptor Jedd Garet. Future director Jim Jarmusch was the sound recordist. The film, made for $25,000 with the assistance of Colab's No wave cinema project, was shot in the Mudd Club (at one point owner Steve Mass is held hostage there) and Lower East Side apartment interiors. Underground U.S.A. was Eric Mitchell's third no wave film and the first to be shot in 16 mm film.

Underground U.S.A. is loosely based on the Billy Wilder’s 1950 black comedy film noir Sunset Boulevard via Andy Warhol’s 1972 film Heat. A general jaded slow pace and camp deadpan acting style is characteristic of the film. Characters exist less for themselves but as general iconic anchoring devices. Underground U.S.A. ran for six months as a midnight movie at St. Marks Cinema and in 2018 was presented twice at The Museum of Modern Art. Influenced by the films of Jean-Luc Godard and Rainer Werner Fassbinder, Underground U.S.A. was added in 2018 to MoMA's permanent film collection.

== Plot synopsis ==
Underground U.S.A. begins with a bisexual street hustler named Victor (played by Eric Mitchell himself) being tossed out of his living situation and into Downtown Manhattan's art, fashion, and club circles. Not knowing what to do, he inveigles his way into the chic wistful entourage around a fading movie star named Vicky (played by Patti Astor), whose platinum blonde hairdo suggests that of Edie Sedgwick and Kim Novak. Vicky's loyal chauffeur is played by Tom Wright and her effete manager/butler, named Kenneth, is played by Rene Ricard. Kenneth has been protecting Vicky from the truth of her decline in popularity, but Vicky eventually comes to understanding the gravity of that fall through the hustler. She gradually spirals into drugs and towards suicide. The satirical post-punk art underground looks on with disdain as the characters drift from art openings to party after party, engaging in idle chitchat about an art market so controlled by capitalism that paintings are bought only to be stored away for profit, never to be seen again. In the film’s final scene, Vicky, wearing a neo-cubist black and white dress, is falsely told by Kenneth that "Andy" (Andy Warhol) has called about starring Vicky in his next film, that is to start shooting next week. Imagining herself to be the newest Warhol superstar, Vicky becomes deliriously deluded. As she emerges from her bedroom to face what she thinks is a large party crowd of loving friends and devoted colleagues, she only finds there her butler, her chauffeur, and her hustler.

== See also ==
- List of films released by New Line Cinema
- No wave cinema
