= Jamie Nares =

British artist

Jamie Nares (formerly James Nares; born 1953 in London, England) is a British transgender woman artist living and working in New York City since 1974. Nares makes paintings and films (most notably the no wave film Rome '78), and played guitar in the no wave groups James Chance and the Contortions and the Del-Byzanteens (the latter also including Jim Jarmusch).

== Early life and art education ==
Nares attended the Chelsea Art School in London from 1972 to 1973. She later studied at the School of Visual Arts in New York from 1974 to 1976.

== Painting ==
Nares is best known as a contemporary art painter. Her method involves repeated strokes that eventually create a precise representation.

She is known for employing single but intricate gestural brush strokes in most of her works. Grace Glueck, New York Times art critic, described the effect of Nares's paintings as a combination of Japanese calligraphy and the 1960s cartoon works of Roy Lichtenstein. These techniques have been compared to those of the Action Painters as well as Abstract Expressionists. Her work is exhibited in various museums in the United States: such as the Museum of Modern Art in New York, the Albright-Knox Art Gallery in Buffalo, NY, and the Whitney Museum of American Art in New York. Some of her solo exhibitions include 1976: Films and Other Works at Paul Kasmin Gallery, in New York in 2012, and Mixed Use, Manhattan: Photography and Related Practices 1970s to the present in 2010 at the Museo Nacional Centro de Arte Reina Sofia in Madrid, Spain.

Nares's other solo exhibitions include New Paintings in 2004 at the Hamiltons Gallery in London and the New Paintings and Chronophotographs exhibition in 2005 at the Goss Gallery in Dallas. Her works were also featured in the Painting and Sculpture exhibition at the Lehmann Maupin gallery in New York City in 2010.

Rizzoli published a monograph dedicated to Nares's works in 2013.

When speaking on her work, Nares once stated:

I try to embody the nature and combine the forms—it's like one and one making three—to expose a metaphor of some kind. It's searching for metaphors, for likeness, like a breeding ground. It seems to me, that's how a language develops. Everything breeds through metaphors.

== Video and film ==
In the mid-1970s, Nares made a series of short sculptural-related minimal art films. In 1978, she released a no wave 82-minute color Super-8 film entitled Rome 78, her only venture into feature-length, plot-driven film. The narrative is about the Roman emperor Caligula now set in a shabby 1978 East Village apartment. As such, it proposes an analogy between ancient Rome and modern America as cultural empires. Despite its large cast in period costumes, the work is never made out to be a serious undertaking, with actors who interject scenes with self-conscious laughter, and deliver seemingly improvised lines with over the top bravado. The work features No Wave Cinema regular Lydia Lunch of Teenage Jesus and the Jerks along with artist David McDermott of McDermott & McGough as Caligula, James Chance, John Lurie, Eric Mitchell as a Roman general, Judy Rifka, Jim Sutcliffe, Lance Loud, Mitch Corber, Patti Astor, Anya Phillips as the Queen of Sheba and Kristian Hoffman, among others.

Nares' 2012 video "Street" (with a score composed by Thurston Moore), later acquired by the National Gallery of Art, debuted at the Wadsworth Atheneum and depicted street scenes in Manhattan. The video was filmed with a Phantom Flex camera on the back of a sport utility vehicle, and featured the daily routines of pedestrians, tourists, and even pigeons in the city, as well as more known figures such as the Naked Cowboy. In 2013, "Street" was also exhibited at the Metropolitan Museum of Art alongside 77 works from the museum's collections, including drawings by Francisco Goya. From November 27-29, 2020, the Metropolitan Museum of Art projected "Street" on its Fifth Avenue building.

== Selected solo exhibitions ==
- 2019: Nares: Moves, Baker/Rowland Gallires, Milwaukee Art Museum, Milwaukee, WI
- 2013: Street, Reinberger Galleries, Cleveland Institute of Art, Cleveland, OH
- 2013: Road Paint, Paul Kasmin Gallery, New York, NY
- 2013: Street, Cinemarfa Film Festival, Marfa, TX
- 2013: Street, Metropolitan Museum of Art, New York, NY
- 2012: New Media Series – James Nares: Street, St. Louis Art Museum, St. Louis, MO
- 2012: Street, Wadsworth Atheneum, Hartford, CT
- 2012: James Nares, 1976: Films and Other Works, Paul Kasmin Gallery, New York, NY
- 2011: Cinemarfa Film festival, Marfa, TX
- 2011: The Films of James Nares, IFC Center, New York, NY
- 2010: New Paintings and a Film, Michael Kohn Gallery, Los Angeles, CA
- 2010: James Nares at the Armory Show, Paintings and Video, The Armory Show, Paul Kasmin Gallery, Pier 94, New York, NY
- 2009: James Nares, New Paintings, New Video: Element Number One, Paul Kasmin Gallery, New York, NY
- 2009: James Nares, Galleria Arnes Y Roepke, Madrid, ES
- 2008: Galerie Stefan Roepke, Cologne, DE
- 2008: Sebastian Guinness Gallery, Dublin, IE
- 2008: James Nares: Motion Pictures (film retrospective), Anthology Film Archives, New York, NY
- 2007: Galerie Stefan Roepke, Cologne, DE
- 2007: Michael Kohn Gallery, Los Angeles, CA
- 2005: New Paintings and Chronophotographs, Paul Kasmin Gallery, New York, NY
- 2005: Goss Gallery, Dallas, TX

== Filmography ==
- 2011: Street (61 min, HD video)
- 2010: Thread (3.5 minutes, HD video)
- 2010: To Make A Prairie (12.5 mins, 16mm)
- 2009: Element Number One (30 mins, HD video)
- 2008: With God On Our Side (8 mins, HD video)
- 2007: Globe (43 min, HD video)
- 2007: Paper Factory (8 min, video)
- 2007: Drip (2 min, video)
- 2007: Drop (4 min, HD Video)
- 2007: Primary Function (2 min, HD video)
- 1998: Cloth (3 min, 16mm, silent)
- 1998: Punch (2 min, 16mm, silent)
- 1998: Giotto Circle #2 (3.5 min, Hi-8 video)
- 1991: Hammered (2 min, video)
- 1991: The Lighthouse (30 min, video)
- 1991: Weather Bed (3 min, video)
- 1991: Cornfield (8.5 min, video)
- 1991: Piano (8.5 min, video)
- 1990: Glove (1.5 min, Hi-8 video)
- 1990: Lens (2.5 min, Hi-8 video)
- 1987: Studio Tape (45 min, Hi-8 video)
- 1982: Waiting For The Wind (7.5 min, Super8)
- 1980: No Japs At My Funeral (60 min, video)
- 1978: Rome '78 (75 min, Super8-to-16mm.)
- 1977: TV Faces (6 min, Super8-to-16mm)
- 1977: Suicide? No, Murder (30 min, Super8-to-16mm)
- 1976: Game (3 min, video)
- 1976: Block (3 min, Super8-to-16mm, silent)
- 1976: Giotto Circle #1 (3 min, Super8-to-16mm, silent)
- 1976: Poles (2 min, video)
- 1976: Pendulum (17 min, Super8-to-16mm)
- 1976: Studio Pendulum (7 min, Super8-to-16mm)
- 1976: First Pendulum (5 min, Super8-to-16mm)
- 1976: Steel Rod (5 min, Super8-to-16mm, silent)
- 1976: Arm And Hammer (3.5 min, Super8-to-16mm, silent)
- 1976: Ramp (3 min, Super8-to-16mm)
- 1976: Twister (2 min, Super8-to-16mm, silent)
- 1975: Handnotes #2 (5 min, video, silent)
- 1975: Roof (12 min, 1/2" video)
