= The Foreigner (1978 film) =

- Film poster
- Directed by: Amos Poe
- Written by: Amos Poe
- Produced by: Amos Poe
- Release date: 1978
- Running time: 90 min.
- Country: United States
- Language: English

The Foreigner is a 1978 American independent no wave film directed by Amos Poe starring Eric Mitchell with semi-improvised appearances by Patti Astor, Anya Phillips and Debbie Harry.

Its postmodern faux film noir style was influenced by the French New Wave films of Jean-Luc Godard (particularly Alphaville) and the low budget Underground films of Andy Warhol and Jack Smith and the ensemble casting of Rainer Werner Fassbinder and John Cassavetes.

It also was heavily influenced by No Wave DIY post-punk style of music and contains an onscreen appearance of The Cramps in a scene shot in CBGB's. This early version of The Cramps, billed in the film as The Erasers (not the actual No Wave band Erasers), perform a live version of the Iggy Pop/David Bowie song Funtime. Prior to that, Debbie Harry of Blondie sings a cappella a Kurt Weil song in the alley behind the Mudd Club. Ivan Král, of the Patti Smith Group, provided the ambient electro soundtrack.

== Cinematography ==
This rather nihilistic 16mm film has a look of grimy glamor as it was shot on the streets of New York City on a shoestring budget with a small cast and crew. The dialog is sometimes inaudible while the black and white cinematography of Chirine El Khadem (with art direction of Sam Blank) is often exceptionally good, with some severe upward angle-shots of the World Trade Towers and artistic non-narrative camera work at the conclusion of the film as the protagonist (Max Menace) races on foot through the crowded sidewalks of Broadway. Also there are beautiful shots of the empty temporary beach on the site of what would become Battery Park City. Starkly beautiful scenes were also shot in the abandoned streets of the decaying Lower East Side.

== Plot ==
A Frenchman named Max Menace (played by Eric Mitchell in a white suit and black tie) is a blond secret agent who arrives in New York City on an unstated (perhaps political assassination) mission. The plot remains vague throughout, just as the reasons why many people want him dead. Regardless, boredom sets in for Max as he waits at the Hotel Chelsea for his assignment, so he begins wandering around the city encountering some wanton women and a variety of post-punk weirdos and creeps. This aimless waiting and wandering comprises the bulk of the movie, much like the 1964 Red Desert film by Michelangelo Antonioni. Here too, alienation thrusts the anti-hero into an unstructured and purposely-meandering storyline that ends with his murder at Battery Park, with a view of the Statue of Liberty in the distant background.

== Cast ==
- Eric Mitchell (Max Menace)
- Patti Astor (Philly Harlowe)
- Terens Sellers (Zasu Weather)
- Duncan Hannah (King Bag)
- Kitty Sondern (Kitbag)
- Steven Kramer (Jimmy Uptight)
- Deborah Harry (Dee Trick)
- Robin Crutchfield (Mousebag)
- Anya Philips (Doll)

== Awards ==
- Berlin International Film Festival (1982)
