= Terence Sellers =

American writer (1952–2016)

Terrence Sellers
- Born: October 5, 1952
- Died: January 25, 2016 (aged 63)
- Notable works: The Correct Sadist

Website
- www.terencesellers.org

Terence Sellers (October 5, 1952–January 25, 2016), also known as Mistress Angel Stern, was a New York-based writer and dominatrix involved in the New York Downtown Arts Scene. Her papers have been collected by New York University's Fales Library Downtown Collection.

Terence Sellers was born in 1952 to Robert and Gloria Sellers in Washington, D.C. From 1970 to 1973 she attended St. John's College in Santa Fe, New Mexico, in the Classical Studies department but did not complete her degree. She earned a BA in forensic psychology at John Jay College in New York City in 1986.

In 1973 Sellers moved to New York City intending to pursue a career in writing and dance. Shortly after moving to New York she formed friendships with artists and writers including Anya Phillips, Kathy Acker, Duncan Smith, Victor Bockris, Carl Apfelschnitt, Jimmy De Sana and Duncan Hannah, many of which resulted in collaborations. For example, Sellers and Hannah worked on several projects together, including Amos Poe's 1978 film The Foreigner. Around the same time Sellers worked with photographer Jimmy De Sana on a series of 32 photographs entitled "The Dungeon Series". The original intent of the project was to use the photographs in Sellers' then unpublished work The Correct Sadist. However, after the work was complete De Sana and William S. Burroughs used the photographs to illustrate their own book project, Submission.

Sellers kept daily journals, maintained correspondence with friends, family and colleagues, wrote short stories and worked on several manuscripts. She was an early contributor to BOMB Magazine, X Magazine, Vacation and other publications devoted to New York's Downtown art, music, film and literary scene.

Most of Sellers' writing is on the subject of sadomasochism. While her work as a professional dominatrix and her fascination with violence, self-punishment, the occult, and psychoanalysis shaped much of her writing, her literary influences include Baudelaire, Dostoevsky, and the French surrealists.

Sellers' novel The Correct Sadist: The Memoirs of Angel Stern is written as a collection of short "case studies" relating to themes of sexual dominance and submission, bondage and discipline, and fetishism. Originally published by iKoo-Buchverlg in Berlin in 1981 as Der korrekte Sadismus, Sellers self-published the work in English under Vitriol Publications in 1983. In 1985, Grove Press contracted the novel and Barney Rosset handled its publication. It is also published in France, Italy, and the United Kingdom.

Sellers' other published novels include The Obsession, and Dungeon Evidence: The Correct Sadist II. Excerpts from other manuscripts such as The Degenerate, Most Ill of All and One Decadent Life have appeared in publications in several languages. Sellers participated in events such as The Times Square Show (1980) and read her work throughout the US, Europe and Canada.

Sellers was a pioneer in New York City's BDSM economy within which artists like Sellers were able to leverage their creative talents into income by facilitating deviant sexual fantasies of wealthy clients. This field was particularly lucrative through the 1980s, becoming more saturated with potential service workers by the mid-1990s.

Seller's support of and friendship with gender and industrial music pioneer, Genesis P-Orridge is noted in the latter's memoir, Nonbinary.

Sellers died on January 25, 2016, from leukemia, soon after her diagnosis.
