= Rome '78 =

1978 film by Jamie Nares

- Directed by: Jamie Nares
- Release date: 1978
- Running time: 82 minutes
- Country: United States

Rome '78 is a 1978 No wave historical drama film directed by Jamie Nares. Shot at various neoclassical buildings in New York City as a stand-in for Ancient Rome and featuring hallmarks of contemporary city life, the film depicts the life of Caligula.

== Cast ==
- David McDermott
- Jamie Nares
- James Chance
- Pat Place
- John Lurie
- Lydia Lunch
- Patti Astor
- Lance Loud
- Eric Mitchell as Metallus

== Production ==
Nares' sole narrative feature, Rome '78 was shot on Super 8 film in Manhattan.

== Legacy ==
Nate Freeman of Observer described Rome '78 as "one of [the No wave] movement's seminal artifacts."
