= De la Reguera =

De la Reguera is a surname. Notable people with the surname include:

- Ana de la Reguera (born 1977), Mexican actress
- Luis Fernandez de la Reguera (1966–2006), American independent film director
