= The Way It Is (film) =

The Way It Is or Eurydice in the Avenues
- Directed by: Eric Mitchell
- Written by: Eric Mitchell
- Produced by: Dan Sales (executive producer), Robert Verrall & Randal A. Goya (associate producer)
- Starring: Steve Buscemi; Jessica Stutchbury; Mark Boone Junior; Vincent Gallo; Rockets Redglare; Edwige Belmore
- Release date: 1985
- Running time: 80 min.
- Country: United States
- Language: English

The Way It Is (also known as The Way It Is or Eurydice in the Avenues) is a 1985 American No Wave black comedy/drama film directed by Eric Mitchell based on the myth of Orpheus and Eurydice. Its 80 minutes black and white 35 mm movie film cinematography was shot by Bobby Bukowski and edited by Bob Gould and Susan Graef. The musical score was by Larry Crosley and Vincent Gallo. The film marked Steve Buscemi and Vincent Gallo's film debuts.

The Way It Is or Eurydice in the Avenues is an indirect homage to the Marcel Camus film Black Orpheus (1959) and in general to French New Wave and Italian Neorealism filmmaking. It is considered the climatic apogee of no wave low-budget production values as the film’s dialogue track was dubbed and added to the film in editing.

== Plot ==
A group of East Village off Broadway actors are rehearsing a local no wave production of Jean Cocteau’s Orpheus when the lead actress, Eurydice, is found dead in Tompkins Square Park. At the funeral, the history of Eurydice is revealed in flashbacks and recollections by the actors, each a suspect in the murder. Together they examine their decadent relationships with Eurydice within the context of decayed East Village tenement buildings and the Mudd Club so to try to unravel the mystery of her death.

== Cast ==
- Edwige Belmore
- Kai Eric
- Vincent Gallo
- Boris Major
- Jessica Stutchbury
- Steve Buscemi
- Mark Boone Junior
- Rockets Redglare
- Brett Bartlett
- Danny Rosen
- Eric Mitchell

== Awards ==
- Berlin International Film Festival 1985
- Locarno International Film Festival 1985
- International Film Festival Rotterdam 1985
- São Paulo International Film Festival 1985
