= Subway Riders =

- Subway Riders poster for the Bleecker Street Cinema featuring Cookie Mueller as Penelope Trasher
- Directed by: Amos Poe
- Written by: Amos Poe
- Produced by: Amos Poe; Johanna Heer
- Starring: Robbie Coltrane; Charlene Kaleina; Cookie Mueller; John Lurie; Amos Poe; Susan Tyrrell; William Rice; Ed Buck
- Cinematography: Johanna Heer
- Edited by: Amos Poe; Orlando Gallini; Johanna Heer
- Music by: Ivan Král; John Lurie; Robert Fripp; The Lounge Lizards
- Release date: 1 February 1981
- Running time: 120 min.
- Country: United States
- Language: English

Subway Riders (also known as Os Viajantes da Noite) is a 1981 American No Wave mock-thriller film directed by Amos Poe.

It stars Robbie Coltrane, Susan Tyrrell, Charlene Kaleina, Cookie Mueller, and John Lurie. Screen appearances are also made by Lydia Lunch, Glenn O'Brien, Tony Shafrazi, Tom Wright and Lance Loud. 16mm color cinematography shot by Johanna Heer. The musical soundtrack includes Robert Fripp, Ivan Kral and The Lounge Lizards. The dark jagged mood of this semi-abstract film is heightened by a no wave sax-heavy soundtrack.

== Plot ==
Shot on location in hauntingly grimy New York City, Subway Riders is a faux detective drama that chronicles a string of murders committed by a screen writer/saxophone player named Anthony (played by both Amos Poe and John Lurie) as he moved through the city meeting a variety of odd underworld characters, seducing them with his sax music, shooting them dead, and hiding out in the all night New York City Subway. What ensues is an investigation of the murders by a hard-boiled detective named Fritz Langley (an obvious reference to Fritz Lang) played by Robbie Coltrane. Along the way Anthony meets an assortment of no wave personalities, including Cookie Mueller as the upstairs sax-hating prostitute Penelope Trasher.

== Cast ==
- Susan Tyrrell - Eleanor Langley
- Robbie Coltrane - Detective Fritz Langley
- John Lurie - The Saxophonist
- Amos Poe - Writer Ant
- Cookie Mueller - Penelope Trasher
- Charlene Kaleina - Claire Smith
- William Rice - Mr. Gollstone
- Ed Buck - Vulture
- Emily Poe - Cola-Marie
- Lance Loud - 1st Client
- Nina Gaidarova - Upstairs Girl
- Tony Shafrazi - Last Client
- Lindzee Smith - Mugger
- Chris Kosburg - Boy in Bed
- William Rice - Mr. Gollstone
- Henry Benvenutti - The Super
- Emilio Cubeiro - The Poet
- Glenn O'Brien - C.O.D. Isherwood
