= Patti Astor =

American performer (1950–2024)

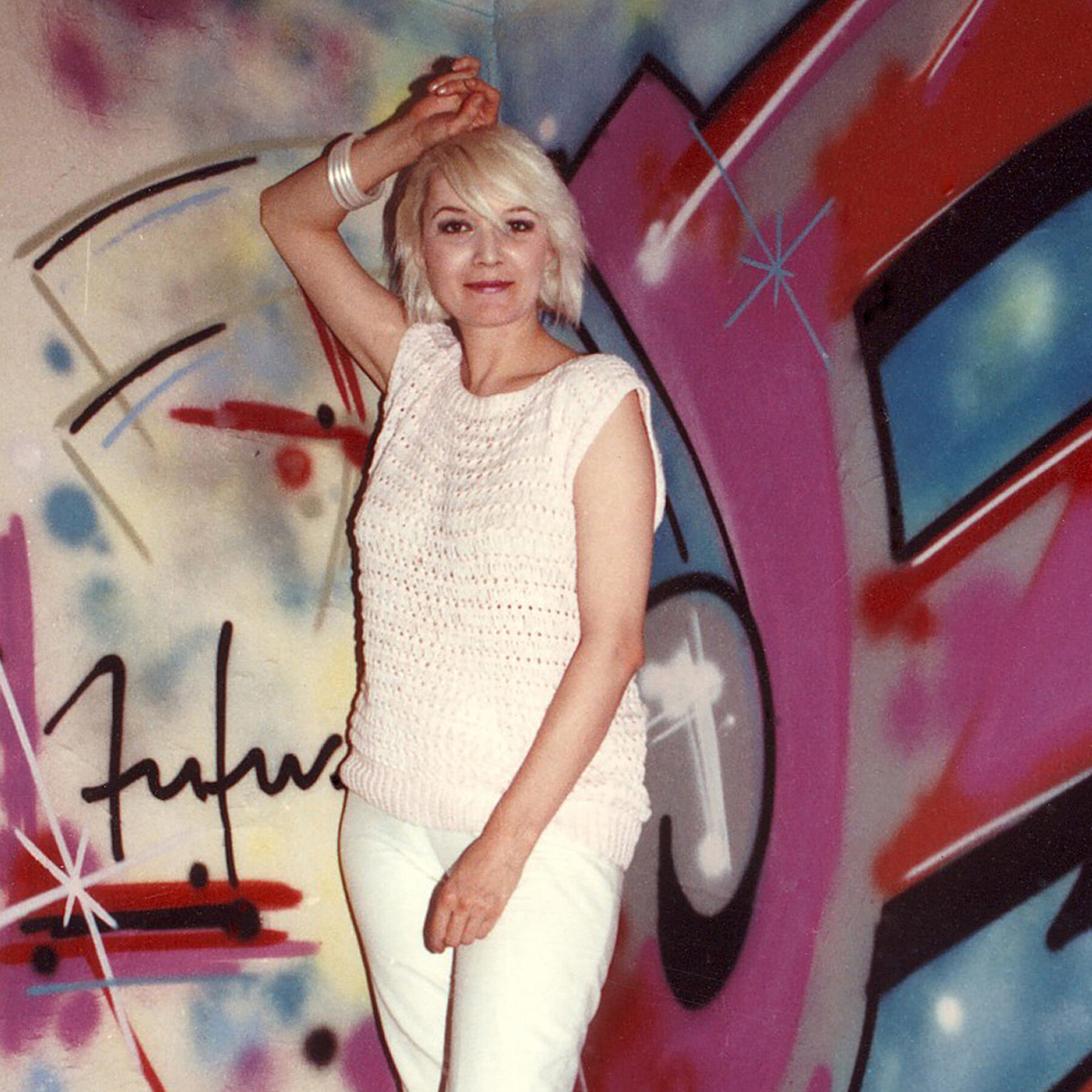
- Publicity photo of Astor
- Born: Patricia Titchener; March 17, 1950; Cincinnati, Ohio, U.S.
- Died: April 9, 2024 (aged 74); Hermosa Beach, California, U.S.
- Occupation: Actress
- Years active: 1976–2024
- Known for: Involved in the early popularization of hip hop music, co-founder of Fun Gallery
- Notable work: Played Virginia in Charles Ahearn's film, Wild Style
- Spouse: Steven Kramer (divorced)

Patricia Titchener (March 17, 1950 – April 9, 2024), known by her stage name Patti Astor, was an American performer who was a key actress in New York City underground No Wave films of the late-1970s. Astor was a key player in the East Village art scene of the early-1980s as she co-founded the instrumental contemporary art gallery, Fun Gallery. Astor also was involved in the early popularizing of hip hop with her performance in Wild Style.

== Biography ==
=== Early life and career ===
Patricia Titchener was born on March 17, 1950 and raised in Cincinnati, Ohio, where she was a charter member of the Cincinnati Civic Ballet. Her adventurous spirit however took her to New York City at the age of eighteen (in 1968) to attend Barnard College. She soon dropped out to take a leadership role in the anti-Vietnam war group SDS (Students for a Democratic Society). She spent two and a half years as a young revolutionary. At the end of that war she traveled the United States and Europe with her contemporary dance act, A Diamond As Big As The Ritz.

=== Music ===
Returning to New York City in 1975, Astor was in the midst of the storm in New York's legendary East Village, from punk rock at CBGB's, the No Wave music scene at the Mudd Club and Tier 3 (nightclub) and independent No Wave films such as Underground U.S.A. (1980) with directors such as Amos Poe, Jim Jarmusch, Charlie Ahearn and Eric Mitchell.

In 1978, she married Steven Kramer, an artist and a keyboardist for the Contortions.

=== Actress ===
Astor had studied acting at the Lee Strasberg Institute. A queen of the downtown scene, she appeared in over a dozen experimental and low-budget No Wave films. Her entry into this genre was Amos Poe's underground Unmade Beds (1976), a black and white 16 mm remake of Jean-Luc Godard's Breathless which she acted in alongside filmmaker Eric Mitchell, Blondie singer Debbie Harry, and artist Duncan Hannah. She also appeared in such low-budget and low-audience films as Rome '78, The Long Island Four, and Snakewoman. Perhaps the best remembered of these was Eric Mitchell's Underground U.S.A (1980), in which she starred in alongside poet Rene Ricard. Her best known role was as Virginia, the roving reporter, in Charlie Ahearn's hip-hop epic, Wild Style.

Her No Wave films are in the permanent collections of the Museum of Modern Art, the Whitney Museum, and the Rock and Roll Hall of Fame.

=== Gallery owner ===
Astor went on to co-found the Fun Gallery in 1981 with partner Bill Stelling. This tenement storefront gallery, was the first of the 1980s East Village galleries, and specialized in showing graffiti artists, like Fab 5 Freddy, Lee Quiñones, Zephyr, Dondi, Lady Pink, and Futura 2000. It also gave important shows to Kenny Scharf (in 1981), Jean-Michel Basquiat (November 1982), and Keith Haring (February, 1983), artists with a street background who showed elsewhere. For a while the mix of worlds was unique, with the FUN crew of downtown artists and hipsters, beat-boys, rock, movie and rap stars mixing with both neighborhood kids and the official art world: museum directors, art historians and uptown art collectors. The gallery closed in 1985, by which time many other East Village galleries had opened, the interest in graffiti painters in the art world had subsided, and rents in the East Village were rising.

=== Later life and death ===
After closing Fun Gallery, Astor moved to Hollywood, Los Angeles where she acted in, wrote and produced Get Tux'd starring Ice-T (in one of his first movie roles) and Assault of the Killer Bimbos which People magazine called "Trash Pick of The Week".

Astor died in Hermosa Beach, California on April 9, 2024, at the age of 74.

== Bibliography ==
- “The True Story of Patti Astor” in Johnny Walker, Janette Beckman, Patti Astor, Peter Beste, No Sleep 'til Brooklyn Perseus Distribution Services. ISBN 1-57687-357-9.
- Dan Cameron, Liza Kirwin, Alan W. Moore, Penny Arcade, Patti Astor. East Village USA New Museum of Contemporary Art, 0915557886.

== Filmography ==
Year	Film	Role	Notes
1976	Unmade Beds	Jeanne Moreau	
1978	The Foreigner	Fili Harlow	
1978	Rome '78		
1978	Kidnapped		Uncredited
1979	Red Italy		
1980	Underground U.S.A.	Vickie	
1980	The Long Island Four		
1982	Wild Style	Virginia	
1987	Forever, Lulu	Mary Anne Zlutnik	
1988	Assault of the Killer Bimbos	Poodles	
2021	Make Me Famous	Herself	
