= Kenny Marino =

American actor

Kenneth "Kenny" Marino (December 29, 1943 – September 27, 2010) was an American actor.

== Career ==
Marino first appeared in the 1981 film Prince of the City as Dom Bando. He later appeared in 1984's Alphabet City. He also starred in Charles Bronson's Death Wish 3. Marino's final appearance was in an episode of the short-lived crime drama series The Black Donnellys as McGee.

== Death ==
Marino died in Jersey City, New Jersey at the age of 66.

== Filmography ==
| Year | Title | Role | Notes |
|---|---|---|---|
| 1981 | Prince of the City | Dom Bando | |
| 1984 | Alphabet City | Tony | |
| 1984 | Exterminator 2 | Tony | |
| 1985 | Death Wish 3 | Used Car Salesman | |
| 1987 | Forever, Lulu | Det. Calhoun | |
| 1999 | The Florentine | Chickie | |
| 1999 | A Clown in Babylon | Cokie the Clown | |
