= Robert Sietsema =

American restaurant critic

Robert Sietsema is an American restaurant critic. He wrote reviews and articles for the Village Voice from 1993 to 2013. He has also contributed to Gourmet magazine. After being let go from the Voice in a round of downsizing, he was hired the following week by Eater, the New York City-based food website, as a feature writer before moving into the role of senior food critic. In December 2024, he was laid off from Eater as part of a round of downsizing.

== Biography ==
Of Dutch descent, Sietsema is from the Midwest. Around 1978, he left college to move to New York City, where his wife-to-be was moving. He worked for a book publishing house and played bass in the band Mofungo alongside guitarist Elliott Sharp.

In 1989, he started a newsletter called Down the Hatch and charged $10 a year for five issues. In 2025, he started a Substack newsletter called Robert Sietsema's New York.

He is a "distant cousin" of Washington Post restaurant critic Tom Sietsema.
