= The Blank Generation =

1976 film by Amos Poe, Ivan Kral

- Directed by: Ivan Kral; Amos Poe
- Produced by: Ivan Kral; Amos Poe
- Starring: Patti Smith Group; Television; Ramones; The Heartbreakers; Talking Heads; Blondie
- Edited by: Amos Poe; Ivan Kral
- Production company: Poe Productions
- Distributed by: New Line Cinema
- Release date: 1976
- Running time: 53 minutes
- Country: United States
- Language: English

The Blank Generation is a 1976 American documentary film that is the earliest of the released low-budget DIY punk rock films from the No Wave scene in New York City in the mid-1970s.Inspired by Jean-Luc Godard, it was filmed by No wave cinema filmmaker Amos Poe and Patti Smith Group member Ivan Kral.

The film includes footage of Blondie, Patti Smith, The Ramones, Television, Talking Heads, New York Dolls, The Heartbreakers, The Shirts, and Robert Gordon (then with Tuff Darts).

== Synopsis ==
Directors and producers Kral and Poe filmed behind-the-scenes and on and offstage footage of punk musicians before they became icons. The project stemmed from Kral's visual diary of his experiences in New York, filming bandmates and friends with a 16mm camera.

== Cast ==
- Richard Hell
- Patti Smith Group
- Television
- Ramones
- The Heartbreakers
- Talking Heads
- Blondie
- Tuff Darts
- New York Dolls
- The Shirts

Musicians featured in the film include: Clem Burke, David Byrne, Jayne County, Wayne County, Jay Dee Daugherty, Jimmy Destri, Billy Ficca, Chris Frantz, Annie Golden, Robert Gordon, Debbie Harry, Richard Hell, David Johansen, Arthur Kane, Lenny Kaye, Ivan Kral, Richard Lloyd, Walter Lure, Lizzy Mercier Descloux, Jerry Nolan, Dee Dee Ramone, Joey Ramone, Johnny Ramone, Tommy Ramone, Jeff Salen (Tuff Darts), Fred Smith, Patti Smith, Richard Sohl, Chris Stein, Syl Sylvain, Johnny Thunders, Gary Valentine, Tom Verlaine and Tina Weymouth; as well as CBGB owner Hilly Kristal and others.

== Production ==
The action is centered on the music scene in New York clubs including CBGB and Max's Kansas City. Film locations also include the Hotel Chelsea, The Bottom Line, and other spots in the Bowery and Lower East Side neighborhoods. Legal disputes between Poe and Kral ultimately resulted in the removal of Poe's name from the credits once Kral asserted copyright to the film years after its initial release.

== Reception ==
Dave Kehr of The Chicago Reader called the film "New wave's answer to The T.A.M.I. Show". while Time Out New York put it at #89 on their list of the 100 Best NY Movies.

== See also ==
- Rock 'n' Roll High School — 1979 film starring The Ramones
- Stop Making Sense — 1984 concert film featuring Talking Heads
- True Stories — 1986 comedy film directed by David Byrne
- CBGB
- Experimental film
- Jean-Luc Godard — inspiration for this film
- Noise music
- No wave cinema
- Postmodern art
