= The Scene Is Now =

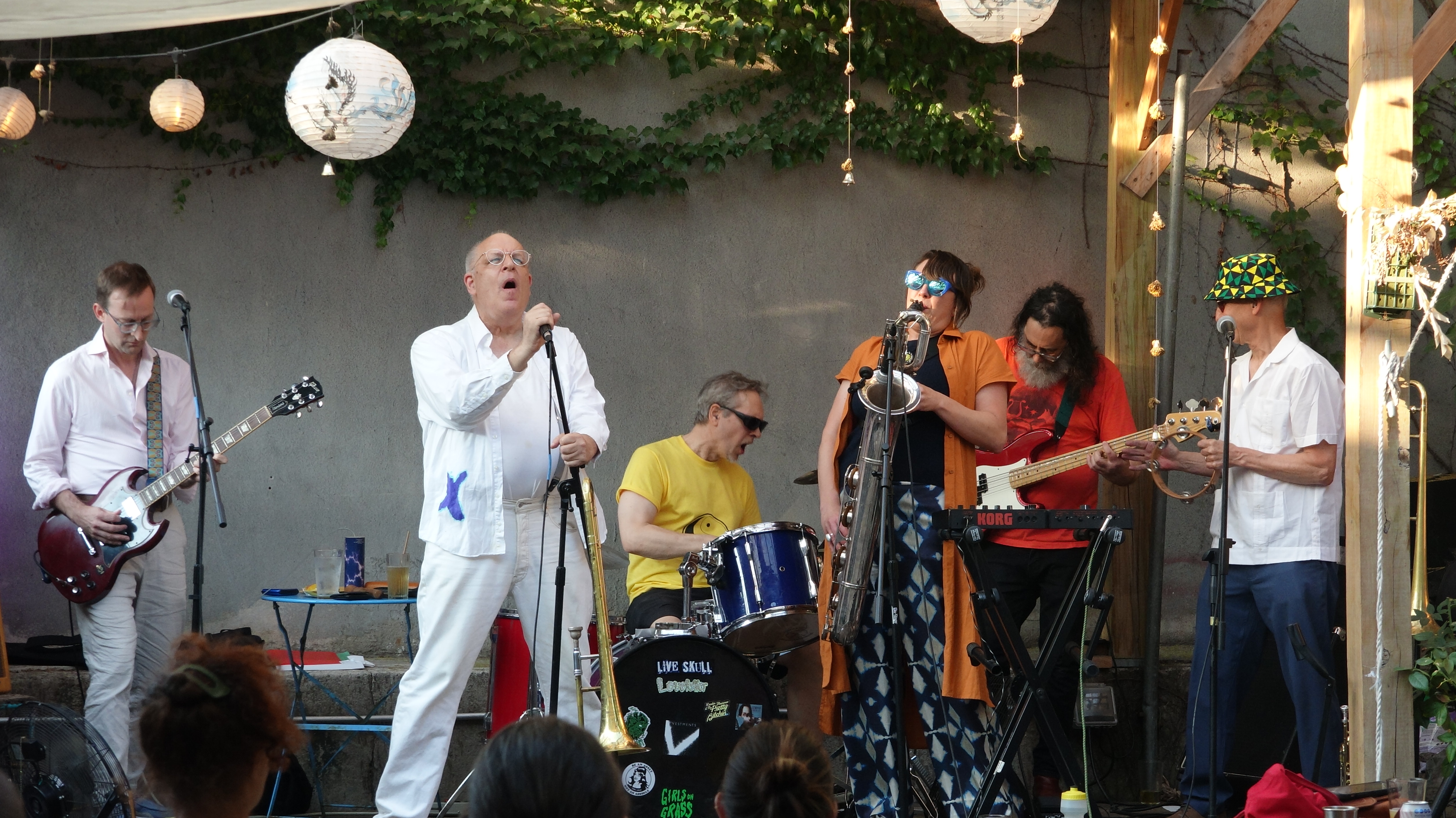

Background information
- Origin: New York City
- Past members: Dick Champ; Philip Dray; Jeff McGovern; Chris Nelson

The Scene is Now is a New York City-based avant-garde no wave band from the 1980s. Its founding members were Dick Champ, Philip Dray, Jeff McGovern (also of Mofungo), and Chris Nelson. Influences included the Holy Modal Rounders, The Fugs, the no wave noise music bands DNA and Mars, and the traditional Americana of Bob Wills and Hoagy Carmichael.

Their songs, most of which are compiled on the album The Oily Years, tend to be somewhat rough, lo-fi recordings. Their song Yellow Sarong was later covered by Yo La Tengo for the 1990 album Fakebook.

Thurston Moore called the band's sound "drunken sailor music" as a compliment.

== Discography ==
- Burn All Your Records (Lost, 1985)
- Total Jive (Lost, 1986)
- Tonight We Ride (Lost, 1988)
- Shotgun Wedding (Lost, 1991; released only on cassette due to a lack of funds)
- The Oily Years (Bar/None, 1995)
- Songbirds Lie (Tongue Master, 2004)
- Magpie Alarm (Tongue Master, 2011)
