= Luis Fernandez de la Reguera =

American film director

- Born: October 20, 1966; New Orleans, Louisiana
- Died: August 14, 2006 (aged 39); Albany, New York
- Occupation: Film director

Luis Fernandez de la Reguera (October 20, 1966 – August 14, 2006) was an American independent film director most famous for his 2003 documentary Rockets Redglare! about the actor of that name.

== Biography ==
Luis Fernandez de la Reguera was born in New Orleans, Louisiana. He weathered a difficult childhood and left for New York City at age 17. Living in the pre-gentrified Lower East Side, he played guitar in several punk rock bands including his own, "Orgy of One", and was a cover story in CMJ magazine.

Prior to becoming a filmmaker, de la Reguera also performed stand-up comedy, and owned the Big Plate recording studio on Ludlow Street.

It was in his interim work as a bartender that he came to know the colorful actor, con artist, East Village personality and heroin addict Rockets Redglare and many of Redglare's wary friends.

In August 2006 while visiting friends in rural Phoenicia in Ulster County, upstate New York, de la Reguera lost control of his motorcycle and crashed. He was airlifted to a hospital in Albany, New York, where he died of severe head trauma a few days later at age 39.

== Differently Able ==
Luis de la Reguera's first film was the 15-minute Differently Able, which he wrote, directed and acted in. Differently Able is about two unhappy brothers forced by circumstance to live together. One brother (played by William Murchu) is in a wheelchair, angry and dependent; the other (played by de la Reguera) a cruel drunk.

== Rockets Redglare! ==
Rockets Redglare! affectionately documents the life and death of character actor and stand-up comedian Rockets Redglare, born Michael Morra. In addition to Redglare himself, the film features interviews with people who knew him well, including actors Steve Buscemi, Willem Dafoe, and Matt Dillon. Buscemi also produced the film, which was shot by de la Reguera using rented equipment. Buscemi and de la Reguera recorded a commentary track for the film's release on DVD.

In February 2006, Buscemi and de la Reguera sued Mike Broder of Small Planet Pictures for $1.75 million, alleging he failed to market, promote, and pay advance fees relating to the distribution of the film. In September 2007, Broder agreed to turn over the rights to the film to de la Reguera's estate and pay up to $35,000 for the plaintiffs' legal fees. If Broder fails to pay within five years, he must pay the entire $1.75 million. Buscemi and William Murchu now plan to re-release and redistribute the film.

=== Recognition and awards ===
- Screened at the 2003 Sundance Film Festival
- Honorable Mention at the 2003 Raindance Film Festival
- At the 2002 New York International Independent Film and Video Festival, Rockets Redglare! won the festival's Grand Jury prize for Best Documentary; Luis de la Reguera won the Best Documentary Director award.

=== Reviews ===
- Chicago Reader
- New York Times
- Raindance Film Festival
- San Francisco Chronicle
