= Unmade Beds (1976 film) =

- Poster featuring Debbie Harry
- Directed by: Amos Poe
- Written by: Amos Poe Amos & Paul Bray
- Produced by: Amos Poe
- Release date: 1976
- Running time: 70 min.
- Country: United States
- Language: English

Unmade Beds is a 1976 American independent No Wave film directed by Amos Poe starring Duncan Hannah, Eric Mitchell, Patti Astor, Kitty Sondern, and Debbie Harry.

The black and white film was shot by Vincente Galindez in the style of guerrilla filmmaking with available light in a car, in city parks and on the streets of New York City on a shoestring budget with a small cast and crew. Unmade Beds was heavily influenced by the films of the French New Wave, particularly Breathless but contains ironic post-punk wooden dialogue during conversations that lack natural expressiveness, as in the films of Andy Warhol. The soundtrack consists mainly of jazzy or modern classical or romantic solo piano music performed by Ivan Kral.

== Plot ==
Rico (aka Little Rico) (played by artist Duncan Hannah) is a bored hard drinking photographer in New York City dreaming of living in Paris and constantly looking for love and an artistic reality to fulfill his French fantasy. He thinks of his camera as a gun, which he loads with bullets of film. He has a few encounters with women before he is shot when asking a stranger on the street where he can find Angel (also the name of his dead dog) because he owed a sum of French francs to vague criminal associates. At which point Paul Orsalino (played by Eric Mitchell) and Jeanne Moreau (played by Patti Astor) take over the plot of this aimless film with a love scene followed by a flashback sequence that includes Rico. The film ends in flashback mode with a series of still black and white photos of Rico and Paul, with their dialogue and romantic sombre piano music on the soundtrack. Then a final return to film, with Rico whistling and singing One for My Baby (and One More for the Road) and Jeanne and Paul over-the-top pretending to be a gangster on an East Village, Manhattan fire escape.

== Cast ==
- Duncan Hannah – Rico
- Eric Mitchell – Paul Orsalino
- Patti Astor – Jeanne Moreau
- Debbie Harry – Blondie
- Kitty Sondern – Kitty Rohmer
