= Alphabet City (film) =

1984 film by Amos Poe

- Promotional film poster
- Directed by: Amos Poe
- Written by: Gregory K. Heller; Robert Seidman; Amos Poe
- Produced by: Andrew Braunsberg
- Starring: Vincent Spano
- Cinematography: Oliver Wood
- Edited by: Grahame Weinbren
- Music by: Nile Rodgers
- Distributed by: Atlantic Releasing Corporation
- Release date: May 4, 1984
- Running time: 85 minutes
- Country: United States
- Language: English
- Budget: $1.2 million
- Box office: $7,035,585

Alphabet City is a 1984 American crime-drama film directed by Amos Poe. The story follows a young New York City gangster of Italian descent named Johnny, who has been given control over his own neighborhood by the Mafia. Then unknown actors Vincent Spano (as Johnny), Jami Gertz, and Michael Winslow and Daniel Jordano are featured in this low-budget thriller. Acclaimed film and stage actress Zohra Lampert plays Johnny's mother. The film is set in Alphabet City, a part of the East Village in New York City.

== Plot ==
The film takes place entirely in one evening, with the time being indicated chronologically on the clock in Johnny's Trans Am. Johnny, a working-class Italian-American from Alphabet City, works for the New York Italian-American Mafia, which has placed him in charge of running organized crime operations and rackets in his neighborhood, including drug-dealing operations and the collection of protection money, debts, and street taxes and kick-ups from other local gangsters.

Early in the evening, Johnny meets with his friend Lippy, an eccentric cocaine dealer. They discuss the planned arson of an Alphabet City tenement building as ordered by the Mafia. As their discussion progresses, it becomes clear that it is Johnny who must carry out the burning of the building before the night is over and that his impoverished mother and sister live in the targeted building. This request pushes Johnny to plan a split from the Mob, which proves difficult. By the end of the night, Johnny must save his sister and mother from the burning of their building as well as rescue his girlfriend and their newborn child from the clutches of the Mob.

== Cast ==
- Vincent Spano as Johnny
- Michael Winslow as Lippy
- Kate Vernon as Angie
- Jami Gertz as Sophia
- Zohra Lampert as Mama
- Raymond Serra as Gino
- Daniel Jordano as Juani
- Kenny Marino as Tony
- Tom Mardirosian as Benny
- Clifton Powell as Ramon
- Tom Wright as Chauffeur

== Music ==
The music was composed by the prolific producer Nile Rodgers, notable for his work with acts such as Chic, Sister Sledge, and Madonna.

== Vehicle ==
The vehicle Vincent Spano drives in the film is a 1983 Pontiac Trans Am 25th Anniversary Daytona 500 Edition. Only 2,500 of the cars were built.
