= Mofungo =

- Years active: 1979–1993
- Past members: Kym Bond; Willie Klein; Michael McMahon; Jim Posner; Amy Rigby; Robert Sietsema; Jeff McGovern; Chris Nelson; Elliott Sharp; A.C. Chubb

Mofungo was a New York City-based band that was active from 1979 to 1993. It featured guitarist Elliott Sharp and food writer Robert Sietsema. Members Chris Nelson and Jeff McGovern were also founding members of The Scene Is Now.

Robert Christgau described their last album as "basically unlistenable unless you grant it your full attention". The New York Times described them as "not your typical rock and roll band".

Sietsema listed Contortions and DNA as influences. During their career, they played with artists including the Fall, Minutemen, Nico, Pavement, Sonic Youth, and Yo La Tengo. Sietsema believes that the band's track End of the World was an influence on the refrain of R.E.M.'s It's the End of the World as We Know It (And I Feel Fine).

== History ==
According to Sietsema, Mofungo was the successor band to another group called Blinding Headache, which featured Rick Brown, later of the band Run On. Brown's bandmates were Kym Bond, Willie Klein, and Jim Posner. Later, Brown left the band and formed another group called Information, and the three remaining members formed Mofungo with Sietsema, as well as brother and sister Michael McMahon and Amy Rigby (née McMahon). McMahon and Rigby left shortly after the band's formation.

Mofungo, Blinding Headache, and Information were featured on Tape #1, a tape that was released in 1980. Mofungo later released their debut 7'', Elementary Particles, which was almost entirely instrumental. Their debut album, End of the World, was released in 1981. It featured drummer Jeff McGovern. Four songs on the album were mixed by Chris Stamey, founder of the dB's, and one was recorded by Anne DeMarinis, then a member of Sonic Youth.

Mofungo reunited on December 6, 2010, to open for Yo La Tengo on the sixth night of their annual Hanukkah show, at Maxwell's in Hoboken, New Jersey.

== Discography ==
- End of the World [(unlabeled), 1981]
- Out of Line [Zoar, 1983]
- Frederick Douglass [Twin/Tone/Coyote, 1985]
- Messenger Dogs of the Gods [Lost, 1986]
- End of the World, Part 2 [Lost, 1987]
- Bugged [SST, 1988]
- Work [SST, 1989]
