= Rockets Redglare =

American actor and stand-up comedian

- Rockets Redglare, c. 1983
- Born: Michael Morra; May 8, 1949; New York City, New York, U.S.
- Died: May 28, 2001 (aged 52); New York City, New York, U.S.
- Other name: Rockets Red Glare
- Occupations: Actor; stand-up comedian

Rockets Redglare (born Michael Morra; May 8, 1949 – May 28, 2001) was an American character actor and stand-up comedian. He appeared in over 30 films in the 1980s and 1990s, including a number of independent films and mainstream films, such as After Hours (1985) and Desperately Seeking Susan (1985).

== Early life ==
Redglare was born Michael Morra in New York City to a heroin-addicted 15-year-old mother named Agnes Tarulli Morra. While still in utero, he became addicted to heroin, so doctors added an opiate derivative into his baby formula so that he could withdraw from the drug. Morra's father and uncle were career criminals in the Italian-American underworld in Sheepshead Bay, Brooklyn.

After his father was deported to his native Italy, Agnes began a relationship with a drug-addicted former boxer who assaulted her and her son. Morra also spent time being raised by an aunt in Lindenhurst, New York. After his mother was killed by her boyfriend, Morra changed his name to Rockets Redglare, from the fifth line of the U.S. national anthem "The Star-Spangled Banner".

== 1970s and 1980s ==
From 1970 to 1974, Redglare spent time at Kinsman Hall, a drug rehabilitation center first located in Hauppauge, New York (early 1968), which then moved to Hillsdale, New York, (late 1968) and eventually went to its new facility located in Jackman, Maine (mid 1970). He entered the program as a resident and became employed as a staff member, reaching the position of assistant residential director before leaving Kinsman to return home to New York City.

In the early 1970s, Redglare lived with the actress Baybi Day before moving into a second floor apartment on Third Avenue, off 14th Street. In the late 1970s, Redglare spent most of his time in the East Village, where he "became a permanent fixture in the punk rock and porno film scenes." Redglare worked as a bouncer at the Red Bar in the East Village, as a roadie for a band called The Hassles (which featured a young Billy Joel), and acted as a bodyguard and drug supplier to punk rock bassist Sid Vicious and artist-musician Jean-Michel Basquiat.

The night Vicious is alleged to have killed his girlfriend, Nancy Spungen, Redglare had delivered 40 capsules of Dilaudid to the couple's room at the Chelsea Hotel. In his book Pretty Vacant: A History of Punk, Phil Strongman states that he believes Redglare killed Spungen. Redglare always denied involvement in Spungen's killing to the press, but allegedly admitted to the killing within his circle of friends.

Redglare began performing stand-up comedy routines at East Village/Lower East Side bars such as Pyramid and Club 57 in his own show titled Taxi Cabaret, and he also did performance art. He made his acting debut in the 1985 Eric Mitchell film The Way It Is, also known as Euridice on the Avenues, a film whose cast also included Steve Buscemi and Vincent Gallo (who composed the soundtrack). Later that year, Redglare appeared in the Jim Jarmusch film Down by Law.

== Death ==
Redglare died in 2001 from a combination of kidney failure, liver failure, cirrhosis, and hepatitis C. His death was hastened by his multiple addictions: He admitted that "Anything I ever liked ... I always did to excess", including heroin, cocaine, food, and alcohol. At the time of his death, Redglare was morbidly obese and hospitalized. In 2003, director Luis Fernandez de la Reguera released a documentary about Redglare titled Rockets Redglare! a "portrait of the New York personality from his early days around '50s hustlers to the East Village crowd of the '80s to his tragic death in 2001."

After Redglare's death, obituary-writers tried to sum up Redglare's life and involvement in New York's creative scenes. The Chicago Reader called Redglare a "compulsive hustler who became obese once he decided to substitute beer for drugs", and acknowledges that "he was also a gifted raconteur", especially in informal, relaxed settings. Seattle newspaper The Stranger wrote that Redglare became a New York City "alternative celebrity" in the city's East Village bars and clubs where he drank and told stories.

== Filmography ==
Film
Year	Title	Role	Notes
1984	Stranger Than Paradise	Poker player #1	
1985	Desperately Seeking Susan	Taxi driver	
1985	After Hours	Angry Mob Member #4	
1985	The Way It Is	Rockets	Alternative titles: The Way It Is or Eurydice in the Avenues; Euridice on the Avenues
1986	Down by Law	Gig	
1986	Hotshot		Credited as Rockets Red Glare
1987	Her Name Is Lisa		
1987	Salvation!: Have You Said Your Prayers Today?	Ollie	
1987	Candy Mountain	Van Driver	
1988	Stars and Bars	Peter Gint	
1988	Shakedown	Ira	Alternative title: Blue Jean Cop
1988	Big	Motel Clerk	
1988	Talk Radio	Killer / Redneck Caller	
1989	Rooftops	Carlos	
1989	Mystery Train	Liquor Store Clerk	(segment "Lost in Space")
1989	Cookie	Carmine's Wiseguy	
1990	In the Spirit	Bartender	
1990	Force of Circumstance	The Factor	
1992	In the Soup	Guy	
1993	What About Me	Frank - Raping Landlord	
1996	Trees Lounge	Stan	
1996	Basquiat	Rockets	
1997	Fall	Performance Priest	
1997	Dreamland		
1998	Louis & Frank	Ralph	
1999	The Diary of the Hurdy-Gurdy Man		
2000	Animal Factory	Big Rand	
2012	The Killing Games	Detective 'Police State'	(final film role, in archive footage)
Television
Year	Title	Role	Notes
1990	Monsters	Mr. Swlabr (voice)	Episode: "Mr. Swlabr"
1996	Musical Shorts with Debi Mazar	Club Owner	Television movie
1999	Oz	Barber	1 episode
