= Mudd Club =

Former nightclub in New York City

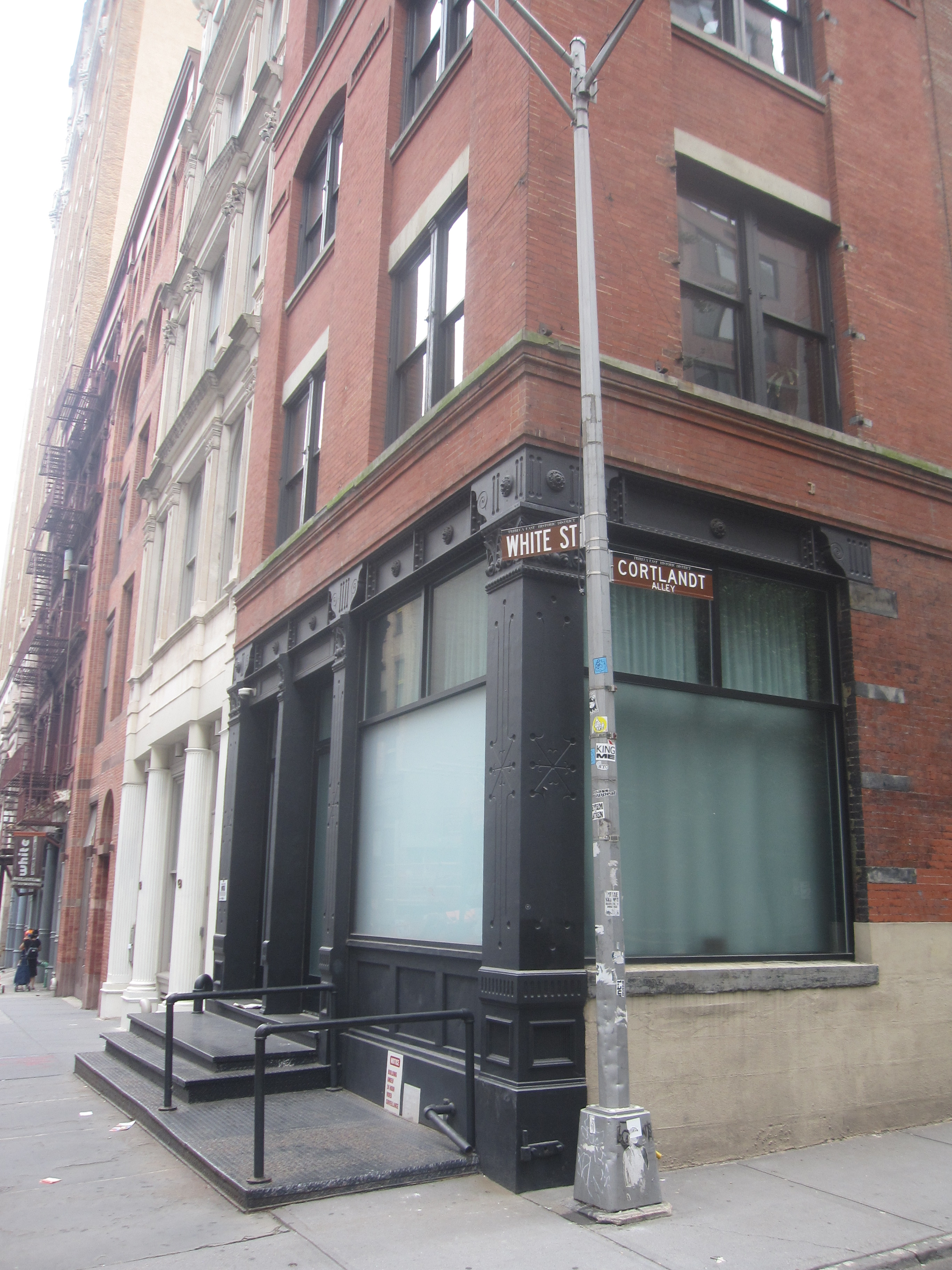
- Mudd Club building facade in New York City
- Interactive map of Mudd Club
- Location: 77 White Street, Manhattan, New York, United States
- Coordinates: 40°43′3.57″N 74°0′8.43″W
- Owner: Steve Mass, Diego Cortez, Anya Phillips

Construction
- Opened: 1978
- Closed: 1983

The Mudd Club was a nightclub located at 77 White Street in the TriBeCa neighborhood of Lower Manhattan in New York City, within the landmarked Tribeca East Historic District. It operated from 1978 to 1983 as a venue for post punk underground music and no wave counterculture events. It was opened by Steve Mass, Diego Cortez and Anya Phillips.

== History ==
The Mudd Club was founded by filmmaker Steve Mass, art curator and filmmaker Diego Cortez, and downtown punk scene persona Anya Phillips in 1978. Mass named the club after Samuel Alexander Mudd, the physician who treated John Wilkes Booth in the aftermath of Abraham Lincoln's assassination. To secure the space for the venue, which was a loft owned by artist Ross Bleckner, Mass described the future venue as essentially an art bar cabaret, like Mickey Ruskin's One University Place, itself based on Ruskin's Max's Kansas City.

Mudd Club featured a bar, unisex bathrooms, and an art gallery curated by Keith Haring on the fourth floor. Live performances there included new wave, experimental music, performance art, literary icons Allen Ginsberg and William Burroughs, and catwalk exhibitions for emerging fashion designers Anna Sui and Jasper Conran. Performers included New York no wave bands such as DNA, Rhys Chatham, Nona Hendryx's Zero Cool, the Contortions, Tuxedomoon and Jean-Michel Basquiat's band Gray. In 1979, Talking Heads performed songs from their new album Fear of Music. Tim Page produced several concerts at the Mudd Club in 1981, in an attempt to meld contemporary art music with rock music and pop music. On the dance floor, DJs David Azarch, Anita Sarko and Johnny Dynell played a unique mixture of punk rock, funk music and curiosities. From the start it functioned as a post-punk "amazing antidote to the uptown glitz of Studio 54 in the '70s". Six months after it opened, the Mudd Club was mentioned in People: "New York's fly-by-night crowd of punks, posers and the ultra-hip has discovered new turf on which to flaunt its manic chic. It is the Mudd Club ... . For sheer kinkiness, there has been nothing like it since the cabaret scene in 1920s Berlin". As it became more frequented by downtown celebrities, a door policy was established and it acquired a chic, often elitist hip reputation.

After its first few years, Studio 54 celebrities like Andy Warhol, Grace Jones, Michael Musto, and David Bowie began to show up. In 1981, the Mudd Club's Steve Mass began going to the more informal Club 57 on St. Mark's Place, and began hiring the Club 57 crowd (including Keith Haring) to help draw in the younger and hipper part of the downtown art scene. As a result, the Mudd Club was frequented by many of Manhattan's up-and-coming cultural celebrities. People associated with frequenting the venue included musicians Lou Reed, Johnny Thunders, David Byrne, Debbie Harry, Arto Lindsay, John Lurie, Nico, Lydia Lunch, X, the Cramps, the B-52's, the Bongos and Judas Priest artist Jean-Michel Basquiat and his then-girlfriend Madonna; Colab members; performers Klaus Nomi and John Sex; designers Betsey Johnson, Maripol and Marisol Deluna; underground filmmakers Amos Poe, Eric Mitchell, Charlie Ahearn, Vincent Gallo, Jamie Nares, Jim Jarmusch, Vivienne Dick, Scott B and Beth B, Kathy Acker, and Glenn O'Brien; supermodel Gia Carangi; and makeup artist Sandy Linter.

The Kitchen Center Mudd Club poster

The Mudd Club closed in the spring of 1983. A regular noted, "At the end, it was not much fun anymore. I mean, it had just become—kind of like the hangers-on to the hangers-on at the Mudd Club".

Mass opened another Mudd Club in Berlin in 2001 (located at Grosse Hamburger Strasse 17); this Berlin club was considered an intimate venue for touring bands. In 2007, the arts organization Creative Time placed a plaque on the NYC building to commemorate the club's existence.

On October 28–29, 2010, a 30-year reunion of Mudd Club artists and regulars was held at the Delancey nightclub in Manhattan. Many bands and performers from the Mudd Club and Club 57 performed, including Bush Tetras, Three Teens Kill Four, Comateens and Walter Steading. The Mudd Club reunion was also attended by two of the three original doormen, Joey Kelly (Buddy Love, Magic Tramps, Dive Bar Romeos) and Richard Boch (author and painter) but not the actor/voiceperson Colter Rule, the first doorman (Halloween, '78- June,'79 with Joey Kelly as "security), who was quoted as stating, "I dislike organized partying these days". A memoir by Boch, The Mudd Club, based on his nearly two years working the Mudd Club door, was published by Feral House in September 2017.

== In pop culture ==
The club has been mentioned in various songs such as "Life During Wartime" (1979) by Talking Heads, "The Return of Jackie and Judy" (1980) by the Ramones, "New York / N.Y." (1983) by Nina Hagen, and "Off the Shelf"(1983) by Elliott Murphy. Frank Zappa included a song named after the club on his 1981 album You Are What You Is. In 2022, Judas Priest issued the CD Live at the Mudd Club ’79 as part of their box set, 50 Heavy Metal Years Of Music.

== See also ==
- CBGB
- Noise music
- Conceptual art
- Tier 3
- Just Another Asshole
- New wave music
- No wave cinema
- Postmodern art
