= Duncan Hannah =

American visual artist and author (1952–2022)

- Duncan Hannah as Rico in Amos Poe's Unmade Beds
- Born: Duncan Rathbun Hannah; August 21, 1952; Minneapolis, Minnesota, U.S.
- Died: June 11, 2022 (aged 69); West Cornwall, Connecticut, U.S.
- Known for: painting, acting, autobiography
- Movement: post-modernism, no wave

Duncan Rathbun Hannah (August 21, 1952 – June 11, 2022) was an American visual artist and author.

== Biography ==
Born in Minneapolis, he attended The Blake School as a boy, and later Bard College, before transferring to the Parsons School of Design, where he graduated in 1975.

Hannah was the author of 20th Century Boy (2018), a memoir sourced from his 1970s diaries, which recounted his life in the no wave downtown art scene of New York City. The New York Times described him as a "scene-maker," logging time at CBGB and other hot clubs and hanging with the Warhol crowd." ARTnews called Hannah a "key participant in the birth of the New York punk scene." He led the fan club devoted to the early punk band Television, and the book relates his encounters and friendships with an array of figures, including David Bowie, Lou Reed, Allen Ginsberg, Patti Smith, Nico, and Salvador Dalí. 20th Century Boy was excerpted in The Paris Review.

The critic and editor Glenn O’Brien noted in Artforum magazine that Hannah's art "causes problems for critics because they can’t figure out if he’s retro- or post-something." The design writer Steven Heller described Hannah's paintings as "post-illustrative, Magritte- and Hopper-esque." Hannah was also referred to as a "romantic realist" who depicted imaginary scenes of retro-nostalgia, such as starlets from old movie posters. In 1980 Hannah's works were included in the influential The Times Square Show along with such artists as Keith Haring and Jean-Michel Basquiat. His paintings have been the subject of solo exhibitions at the Phyllis Kind Gallery and the Center Gallery in Chicago; the Daedalus Gallery and the John Oulman Gallery in Minneapolis; the Rebecca Hossack Gallery in London; the Pierre Menard Gallery in Cambridge, Massachusetts; and the Semaphore Gallery and Charles Cowles Gallery in New York City; among other venues. Hannah's work is included in the permanent collection of the Metropolitan Museum of Art. "I’ve basically ignored the avant-garde," Hannah told an interviewer in 2018. "I was surprised by the conformity of the art world."

Hannah also took a turn at acting, appearing in a duo of No Wave films by Amos Poe, including starring opposite Deborah Harry (later of Blondie) in Unmade Beds (1976), in which he played a photographer who sees himself in 1960s Paris and The Foreigner. Hannah also co-starred in Jennifer Montgomery's 1995 film Art for Teachers of Children.

In his later years, Hannah lived and worked in Brooklyn, New York; and West Cornwall, Connecticut. He died after suffering a heart attack at his home in West Cornwall on June 11, 2022, aged 69. At the time of his death, he was married to Megan Wilson.
