= Tom Wright (American actor) =

American television and film actor (born 1952)

- Born: Harold Thomas Wright; November 29, 1952 (age 73); Englewood, New Jersey, U.S.
- Occupation: Actor
- Years active: 1976–present
- Spouse: Leigh Johnson (m. 1988)
- Children: 2

Harold Thomas Wright (born November 29, 1952) is an American television and film actor. He has appeared in The Brother from Another Planet (1984), Matewan (1987), Creepshow 2 (1987), City of Hope (1991), Passion Fish (1992), Seinfeld (1994), Extreme (1995), Star Trek: Voyager (1996), Murder at 1600 (1997), Martial Law (1998–1999), Sunshine State (2002), Barbershop (2002), Barbershop 2: Back in Business (2004), Honeydripper (2007), Granite Flats (2014), Medical Police (2020), and Daisy Jones & the Six (2023).

== Early life ==
Wright was born on November 29, 1952, in Englewood, New Jersey.

== Career ==
In 1976, his first appearance on screen was in the movie Deadbeat playing an old man. In 1987, he played a lead role as the hitchhiker in the horror film Creepshow 2.

In 2002, Wright co-starred in the feature film Barbershop (2002) and the sequel Barbershop 2: Back in Business (2004) with Ice Cube. In 2002, he co-starred with Angela Bassett as her ex-lover in Sunshine State (2002), Wright did have a good working relationship with writer/director John Sayles, starring in many films previously: The Brother from Another Planet (1984), Matewan (1987), City of Hope (1991), Passion Fish (1992), and Honeydripper (2007).

In 2000, Wright won the Best Actor Award at the Santa Monica Film Festival for his portrayal of John Shed in the indie film Dumbarton Bridge.

He has played roles on several television programs but is best known for playing Mr. Morgan, Yankees co-worker of character George Costanza (Jason Alexander) on Seinfeld; and the hybrid alien Tuvix in the Star Trek: Voyager episode "Tuvix".

In 2014, as a representative of Granite Flats which he starred as Agent Ezekiel Scott for 19 episodes, Wright attended the Dynamic and Diverse 66th Primetime Emmy Awards Celebration of Diversity at the Academy of Television Arts & Sciences in North Hollywood, Los Angeles.

In 2023, Wright played the role of music producer Teddy Price, who is responsible for assisting the band The Six to stardom, doing the same for Daisy Jones, then bringing them together in Daisy Jones & the Six.

== Filmography ==
=== Film ===
- Deadbeat (1977) as Old Man
- Red Italy (1979) as Unknown
- Underground U.S.A. (1980) as Frank
- Subway Riders (1981) as On The Waterfront
- I Ought to Be in Pictures (1982) as Baseball Fan #6
- The Soldier (1982) as Businessman
- Alphabet City (1984) as Chauffeur
- The Brother from Another Planet (1984) as Sam
- Exterminator 2 (1984) as Youth
- Mugsy's Girls (1984) as Party Heckler
- Streetwalkin' (1985) as Henchman #1
- Creepshow 2 (1987) as The Hitchhiker (segment "The Hitchhiker")
- Matewan (1987) as Tom
- I'm Gonna Git You Sucka (1988) as Brothel Man
- Troop Beverly Hills (1989) as James Shakar
- Heart of Dixie (1989) as Black Man At Concert
- Vietnam War Story: The Last Days (1989) as Captain Berry (segment "The Last Outpost")
- Reversal of Fortune (1990) as Jack
- Marked for Death (1990) as Detective Charles Marks
- Street Hunter (1990) as Riley
- City of Hope (1991) as Malik
- Past Midnight (1991) as Lee Samuels
- Dead in the Water (1991) as Hotel Clerk
- Passion Fish (1992) as Luther
- Acting on Impulse (1993) as Dave Byers
- Weekend at Bernie's II (1993) as Charles
- Amityville: A New Generation (1993) as Morgue Attendant
- Men of War (1994) as Jamaal
- Forget Paris (1995) as Tommy
- Tales from the Hood (1995) as Martin Moorehouse
- Excessive Force II: Force on Force (1995) as Grant Thompson
- White Man's Burden (1995) as Lionel
- Invasion of Privacy (1996) as Devereux – Theresa's Attorney
- My Fellow Americans (1996) as Secret Service Agent Jim
- Playing Dangerous 2 (1996) as Alton Broom
- Gridlock'd (1997) as Koolaid
- Menno's Mind (1997) as Jor Norwell, Execuited Rebel (uncredited)
- Murder at 1600 (1997) as Secret Service Agent Cooper
- Palmetto (1998) as John Renick
- The Pentagon Wars (1998, TV Movie) as Major William Sayers
- Funny Valentines (1999) as Dr. Thomas Holder
- Dumbarton Bridge (1999) as John Shed
- Chain of Command (2000) as Secret Service Agent Burke
- The Prime Gig (2000) as Marvin Sanders
- Pursuit of Happiness (2001) as Thom
- Alex in Wonder (2001) as Sebastian
- Layover (2001) as Detective Mills
- The Keyman (2001) as 'Popeye'
- Contagion (2002) as Tom Brenner
- P.S. Your Cat Is Dead (2002) as Fred Gable
- Sunshine State (2002) as 'Flash' Phillips
- Barbershop (2002) as Detective Williams
- Lady Jayne: Killer (2003) as Detective Stan
- Hangman's Curse (2003) as Dan Carillo
- White Rush (2003) as Detective Brandt
- Barbershop 2: Back in Business (2004) as Detective Williams
- In Your Eyes (2004) as Phil
- The Gunman (2004) as Captain Carlton
- Dynamite (2004) as Stan
- Chasing Ghosts (2005) as Tom Shields
- American Fusion (2005) as Dr. Lee / Lethal Killah
- A Year and a Day (2005) as Pryor
- Rampage: The Hillside Strangler Murders (2006) as Detective Bryant
- The Darwin Awards (2006) as Detective #2
- World Trade Center (2006) as Officer Reynolds
- Striking Range (2006) as John Hatem
- Sinner (2007) as Officer Thomas
- Live! (2007) as Dr. Raymond Boyd
- Honeydripper (2007) as 'Cool Breeze'
- The Onion Movie (2008) as Kwame Roberts
- B.O.H.I.C.A. (2008) as Horowitz
- The Imposter (2008) as 'Popeye'
- The Cursed (2010) as Willie Gar
- Burning Palms (2010) as Maxwell Barron
- BoyBand (2010) as Pete
- Rift (2011) as Lietenant Neal
- A Beautiful Soul (2012) as Brother Anthony Clark
- Starting from Scratch (2013) as Stan 'Homeless Stan'
- Stanley DeBrock (2013) as Atticus
- Things Never Said (2013) as Daniel
- Beyond the Lights (2014) as Reverend Brown
- Sin Verite (2014) as Francis Vigneri
- Stockholm, Pennsylvania (2015) as Detective Timms
- The Diabolical (2015) as Curtis
- Runaway Island (2015) as Raymond Tepper
- Storage Locker 181 (2016) as Harris
- Rebirth (2016) as The Expert
- South32 (2016) as Sergeant Kake
- Message from the King (2016) as Waylon
- The Secrets of Emily Blair (2016) as Detective Gorodetsky
- Within (2016) as Detective Pascal
- Transformers: The Last Knight (2017) as Military Attache #1
- The Neighborhood (2017) as Jim 'Bourbon' Beam
- Higher Power (2018) as Tom David, Talk Show Host
- Spell (2018) as Edmund
- The Divorce Party (2019) as Sacks
- #Truth (2019) as Donald Cooper
- That's Amor (2022) as Henry

=== TV appearances ===
Year	Title	Role	Notes
1991	Tales from the Crypt	Mitch	"Abra Cadaver"
1993	L.A. Law	District Attorney Prentiss Scott	"Where There's a Will"
1994–1995	Seinfeld	Mr. Morgan	4 episodes
1995	Extreme	Farley Potts	10 episodes
1996	NYPD Blue	Kwasi Olushola	"The Backboard Jungle", "Where's Swaldo"
1996	Star Trek: Voyager	Tuvix	"Tuvix"
1998–1999	Martial Law	Captain Benjamin Winship	22 episodes
2004	Star Trek: Enterprise	Ghrath	"Storm Front"
2005	The O.C.	Paul Glass	"The Game Plan"
2006	24	Admiral Kirkland	"Day 5, 3:00am–4:00am" "Day 5, 5:00am–6:00am"
2007	House	Dr. Pilcher	"Guardian Angels"
2009	Ghost Whisperer	Dave McKey	1 episode (s4e19)
2010	Modern Family	Security Guard	"Airport 2010"
2010	Southland	Mr. Hill	"The Runner"
2013	The Mentalist	Kevin Rome	"There Will Be Blood"
2013–2015	Granite Flats	Agent Ezekiel Scott	19 episodes
2014	Castle	Fats Shepherd	"Clear & Present Danger"
2015	Criminal Minds	Chief Palmer	"The Night Watch"
2017	Major Crimes	Frederick Sax	"Intersection"
2018	Shooter	Jason Colby	"Sins of the Father"
2020	Medical Police	Director Patton	10 episodes
2021	Station 19	Battalion Chief Gregory	3 Episodes
2023	Daisy Jones & the Six	Teddy Price	Miniseries
