= Anya Phillips =

American music manager (1955–1981)

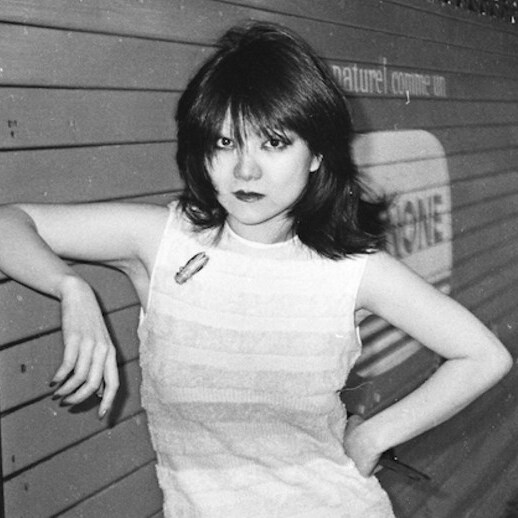
- Phillips, circa late 1970s
- Born: February 1955; Taipei County, Taiwan
- Died: 19 June 1981 (aged 26); Valhalla, New York, U.S.
- Occupations: fashion designer, photojournalist, music manager, punk scene persona
- Years active: 1970s–1981
- Family: Fei Xiang (Brother)

Anya Phillips (February 1955 – June 19, 1981) was a Taiwanese fashion designer and the co-founder of the New York nightclub the Mudd Club. Phillips influenced the fashion, sound, and look of the New York-based no wave scene of the late 1970s. She was also the manager and girlfriend of musician James Chance (aka James White).

== Life and career ==
Phillips was born in Taiwan in 1955. Her mother traveled to Taiwan from Beijing, China, with her first husband before the Chinese Civil War ended in 1949. As the Nationalist Party moved the government to Taiwan while the Communist Party controlled mainland China, her mother was not to return to China due to political rivalry. Later her mother married a military attaché of the American embassy, Wade Phillips, and gave birth to her brother Kris Phillips, who is later known by his stage name as Fei Xiang. Phillips grew up in Taiwan and on various military bases.

As a teenager, Phillips began sketching clothing designs. She met her close friend Sylvia Reed, who later married Lou Reed, while attending the Taipei American School. After graduation, Phillips moved to New York City to attend Parsons School of Design in 1974. She had been awarded a full scholarship, but she dropped out shortly after her studies began.

Phillips arrived in Manhattan during the burgeoning downtown punk scene. She worked as a photojournalist for New York Rocker and Punk magazine. She was nicknamed "Anya Chowmein" when she was writing for Punk.

Phillips became a fixture in the Manhattan nightclub scene. She formed a fake band with Diego Cortez and Duncan Smith in 1977, and she had a dominatrix act at CBGB with Terence Sellers. Phillips persuaded filmmaker Steve Maas to open a nightclub, envisioning it as an elegant place called the Molotov Cocktail Lounge. Phillips, Maas, and Cortez opened the Mudd Club in 1978. She was to manage the club, but her involvement ended after a dispute with Maas.

Phillips was also involved in New York City's late-1970s underground film scene, appearing in Amos Poe's The Foreigner in 1978. She worked with Cortez to shoot his film Grutzi Elvis in Munich.

Phillips went on to manage James Chance and the Contortions and, for a brief period, Lydia Lunch. Phillips first encountered James Chance and the Contortions at a Colab benefit for X Motion Picture Magazine in March 1978. For the Contortions' debut album Buy, she photographed Sellers wearing an outfit she designed for the album's cover artwork. Not knowing how to sew, she designed dresses by tying together strips of cloth. Singer Debbie Harry wore a dress made by Phillips on the cover of the Blondie album Plastic Letters (1978), and again on the cover for her 1983 single "Rush Rush."

Phillips makes a rare vocal appearance in the recording of the James Chance and the Contortions concert in Rotterdam, Netherlands in June 1980 (tape released on ROIR in 1990), to introduce the band and sing backing vocals on the songs "I Danced with a Zombie" and "Melt Yourself Down".

In 1979, Phillips was diagnosed with cancer. To help pay for Phillips' chemotherapy, Chance organized a benefit concert at Bond's in New York in May 1981. The performers included James Chance and the Contortions, Debbie Harry, Chris Stein, Nile Rodgers, Bernard Edwards, Fab 5 Freddy, Kid Creole and the Coconuts, Walter Steding, and Chris Spedding.

== Death and legacy ==
In June 1981, Phillips was taken to Westchester Hospital in New York City by her friend Debbie Harry. Phillips had had been ill but, according to Sylvia Reed, refused to admit the extent of her health problems. She died of brain cancer at the age of 26 in Valhalla, New York on June 19, 1981.

James Chance dedicated his album Sax Maniac to her in 1982.
