= No wave =

Music scene

- Stylistic origins: Punk rock; avant-garde; noise; funk; disco; jazz; free jazz; experimental rock; art rock
- Cultural origins: Late 1970s, New York City
- Derivative forms: Avant-funk

Subgenres
- Post-no wave

Regional scenes
- Chicago no wave; Kansai no wave

Other topics
- Art punk; industrial; new wave; noise pop; noise rock; post-punk; punk jazz; punk-funk; timeline of punk rock

No wave was an avant-garde music and visual art scene that emerged in the late 1970s in Downtown New York City. The term was coined as a rejection of commercial new wave music. No wave musicians took rock instrumentation and experimented with noise, dissonance, and atonality, as well as non-rock genres like free jazz, funk, and disco. The scene often reflected an abrasive, confrontational, and nihilistic worldview, originally pioneered by New York artists Suicide and Jack Ruby.

In 1978, Brian Eno produced the compilation album No New York, which became an important document of the scene. The no wave movement influenced independent film (no wave cinema), fashion, and visual art, then, in the mid-1980s, musical developments such as mutant disco and post-no wave. Regional scenes influenced by New York city no wave emerged, including Japan's Kansai no wave movement along with the Chicago no wave scene.

Notable artists of the scene include James Chance and the Contortions, Teenage Jesus and the Jerks, Mars, DNA, Theoretical Girls and Rhys Chatham. Swans and Sonic Youth originated in no wave before evolving away from the scene.

== Characteristics ==
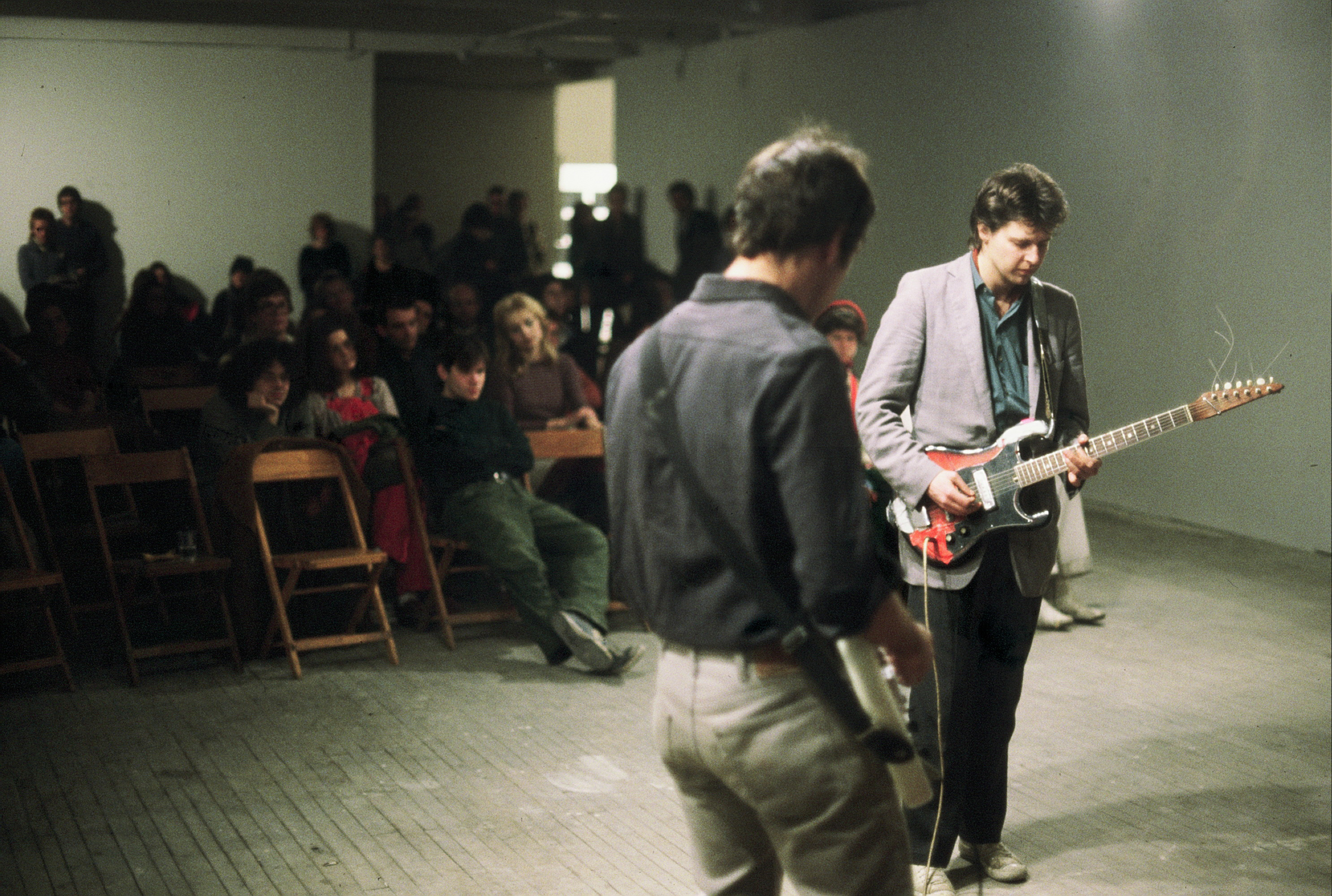
Glenn Branca performing in New York in the early 1980s

No wave is not a clearly definable musical genre with consistent features, but it generally was characterized by a rejection of the recycling of traditional rock aesthetics, such as blues rock styles and Chuck Berry guitar riffs in punk and new wave music. No wave groups drew on and explored such disparate stylistic forms as minimalism, conceptual art, funk, jazz, blues, punk rock, avant garde and noise music. According to Village Voice writer Steve Anderson, the scene pursued an abrasive reductionism which "undermined the power and mystique of a rock vanguard by depriving it of a tradition to react against". Anderson claimed that the no wave scene represented "New York's last stylistically cohesive avant-rock movement".

There were, however, some elements common to most no-wave music, such as abrasive atonal sounds; repetitive, driving rhythms; and a tendency to emphasize musical texture over melody—typical of La Monte Young's early downtown music. In the early 1980s, Downtown Manhattan's no wave scene transitioned from its abrasive origins into a more dance-oriented sound, with compilations such as ZE Records's Mutant Disco (1981) highlighting a playful sensibility borne out of the city's clash of hip-hop, disco and punk styles, as well as dub reggae and world music influences.

No wave music presented a negative and nihilistic world view that reflected the desolation of late 1970s Downtown New York and how they viewed the larger society. In a 2020 essay, Lydia Lunch stated there were many problems in the years that led into the 1970s, and that calling the year 1967 "the Summer of Love" was a "bald-faced lie". The term "no wave" might have been inspired by the French New Wave pioneer Claude Chabrol, with his remark "There are no waves, only the ocean".

== Etymology ==
There are different theories about how the term was coined. Some suggest Lydia Lunch coined the term in an interview with Roy Trakin in New York Rocker. Others suggest it was coined by Chris Nelson (of Mofungo and The Scene Is Now) in New York Rocker. Thurston Moore of Sonic Youth claimed to have seen the term spray-painted on CBGB's theater at 66 Second Avenue before seeing it in the press.

== Influences ==
Although not from New York, Captain Beefheart and the confrontational proto-punk performances of Iggy Pop and the Stooges have been cited as an influence on no wave, alongside Nihilist Spasm Band, an early noise music band whose debut LP No Record was released in 1968. The band plastered the word "NO" on much of their equipment and handmade instruments, and recorded a film between 1965 and 1966 entitled "NO Movie". They have been cited as an influence by Thurston Moore of Sonic Youth.

The Velvet Underground, a 1960s New York City band, are also seen as early contributors to the no wave movement. As described by Pitchfork's Marc Masters, "Mixing the noisy rock leanings of Lou Reed, the minimalist drones of John Cale (via his work with avant-garde pioneer LaMonte Young), and the art world influence of Andy Warhol's Factory, this seminal band provided a comprehensive model for No Wave." Additionally, other 1960s New York-based avant-garde music artists like Yoko Ono, Cromagnon, and the Godz were also later recognized as precursors to no wave.

== History ==
=== 1970s ===
==== Forerunners ====
New York City duo Suicide, formed in 1970, by Alan Vega and Martin Rev, have been cited as having "the biggest influence on no-wave" by Marc Masters. Glenn Branca later stated, “If you have to find out who the godfather of no wave was, it was Alan Vega.”

New York band Jack Ruby, formed in 1973 in Albany, became early pioneers of the aesthetic, philosophy and sound of no wave as well as an influence on Sonic Youth. Members included Randy Cohen on drums and synthesizer as well as Boris Policeband, who played viola through an FM transmitter and strapped police walkie-talkies around his waist. Subsequently, bassist George Scott III joined no wave group James Chance and the Contortions and collaborated with Lydia Lunch in 8 Eyed Spy. Thurston Moore said of Jack Ruby: "This was a band whispered about from the most inner circle of no-wave knowledge, as they pre-dated a lot of the aesthetic weirdness and wild style of so much of that scene."

==== Origins ====
In 1978, a punk subculture-influenced noise series was held at New York's Artists Space. No wave musicians such as the Contortions, Teenage Jesus and the Jerks, Mars, DNA, Theoretical Girls and Rhys Chatham began experimenting with noise, dissonance and atonality in addition to non-rock styles. The former four groups were included on the compilation No New York, often considered the quintessential testament to the scene. The no wave-affiliated label ZE Records was founded in 1978, and would also produce acclaimed and influential compilations in subsequent years.

In 1978, Rhys Chatham curated a concert at The Kitchen with two electric guitar noise music bands that involved Glenn Branca (Theoretical Girls and Daily Life, performed by Branca, Barbara Ess, Paul McMahon, and Christine Hahn) and another two electric-guitar noise music bands that involved Chatham himself (The Gynecologists and Tone Death, performed by Robert Appleton, Nina Canal, Chatham, and Peter Gordon). Tone Death performed Chatham's 1977 composition for electric guitars Guitar Trio, that was inspired by La Monte Young's minimalist composition Trio for Strings and Chatham's exposure to The Ramones at CBGB via Peter Gordon. This proto-No Wave concert was followed a few weeks later when Artists Space served as a site of concrete inception for the No Wave music movement, hosting a five night underground No Wave music festival, organized by artists Michael Zwack and Robert Longo, that featured ten local bands; including Rhys Chatham's The Gynecologists, Glenn Branca's Theoretical Girls, Rhys Chatham's Tone Death, and Branca's Daily Life.

The final two days of the show featured DNA and the Contortions on Friday, followed by Mars and Teenage Jesus and the Jerks on Saturday. English musician and producer Brian Eno, who had originally come to New York to produce the second Talking Heads album More Songs About Buildings and Food, was in the audience. Impressed by what he saw and heard, and advised by Diego Cortez to do so, Eno was convinced that this movement should be documented and proposed the idea of a compilation album, No New York, with himself as a producer.

By the early 1980s, artists such as Liquid Liquid, the B-52's, Cristina, Arthur Russell, James White and the Blacks and Lizzy Mercier Descloux developed a dance-oriented style described by Lucy Sante as "anything at all + disco bottom". Other no-wave groups such as Swans, Suicide, Glenn Branca, the Lounge Lizards, Bush Tetras and Sonic Youth instead continued exploring the forays into noise music abrasive territory. For example, Noise Fest was an influential festival of no wave noise music performances curated by Thurston Moore of Sonic Youth at the New York City art space White Columns in June 1981. Sonic Youth made their first live appearances at this show.

The Noise Fest inspired Speed Trials, the noise rock five-night concert series held May 4–8, 1983, that was organized by Live Skull members in May 1983, also at White Columns (then located at 91 Horatio Street). Among an art installation created by David Wojnarowicz and Joseph Nechvatal, Speed Trials included performances by the Fall, Sonic Youth, Lydia Lunch, Mofungo, Ilona Granet, pre-rap Beastie Boys, 3 Teens Kill 4, Elliott Sharp as Carbon, Swans, the Ordinaires, and Arto Lindsay as Toy Killers. On May 10, the San Francisco noise-punk band Flipper closed the series out with a live concert at Studio 54. This event also included performances by Zev and Eric Bogosian and a video presentation by Tony Oursler. Speed Trials was followed by the short-lived after-hours audio art Speed Club that was established by Nechvatal and Bradley Eros at ABC No Rio that summer.

== Other art media in the no wave scene ==
=== Cinema ===
No Wave Cinema was an underground low-budget film scene in Tribeca and the East Village from the late-1970s to the mid-1980s. Rooted in the gritty, rebellious ethos of the Lower East Side's no wave post-punk art scene, No Wave Cinema was marked by its DIY approach, low budgets, and an unpolished aesthetic that rejected mainstream filmmaking conventions. Musicians, visual artists, and filmmakers converged, regularly working across multiple mediums. This interdisciplinary collaboration and a sense of community was a hallmark of No Wave Cinema.

Avant-garde filmmakers like Andy Warhol, Pier Paolo Pasolini, Jean-Pierre Melville, Rainer Werner Fassbinder and Jack Smith were notable influences, as was French Nouvelle Vague cinema, Italian neorealism, early 1970s intimate low budget European films, such as Bernardo Bertolucci's 1972 film Last Tango in Paris, and a general interest in the history of film noir. Handheld Super 8 film cameras were initially the means to shoot the films often in the street, in downtown nightclubs, in cars, or apartments using available light.

The first No Wave film was Ivan Kral and Amos Poe's 1976 film, The Blank Generation. It explored the No Wave music scene in CBGB's with artists such as the Ramones, Talking Heads, Blondie and Patti Smith, among several others. The second No Wave film was the 1977 short, X-Terminator, directed by Michael Oblowitz. Oblowitz made the film whilst studying at Columbia University and editing Semiotext(e) alongside Kathryn Bigelow and Sylvère Lotringer. Further No Wave filmmakers included Eric Mitchell, Scott B and Beth B, Jim Jarmusch, Jamie Nares, Coleen Fitzgibbon, Diego Cortez, Charlie Ahearn, Tom DiCillo, Lizzie Borden, Susan Seidelman, Vincent Gallo, Charlie Ahearn, Adele Bertei, David Wojnarowicz, Vivienne Dick, Kiki Smith, Michael McClard, Andrea Callard and Seth Tillett. Eric Mitchell's 1985 film The Way It Is or Eurydice in the Avenues is considered the climatic apogee of low-budget production values of no wave filmmaking as the film's dialogue track was dubbed over the 35mm film in editing.

For many years the scene was centered around the Mudd Club and Colab's New Cinema Screening Room on St. Marks Place in the East Village. No Wave Cinema actors included Patti Astor, Steve Buscemi, Cookie Mueller, Debbie Harry, John Lurie, Eric Mitchell, Rockets Redglare, Vincent Gallo, Duncan Hannah, Anya Phillips, Rene Ricard, Arto Lindsay, Tom Wright, Richard Hell, and Lydia Lunch.

=== Visual art ===
Visual artists played a large role in the no wave scene, as visual artists often were playing in bands, or making videos and films, while making visual art for exhibition. An early influence on this aspect of the scene was Alan Vega, whose electronic junk sculpture predated his role in the music group Suicide, which he formed with fellow musician Martin Rev in 1970. They released Suicide, their first album, in 1977.

Important exhibitions of no wave visual art were Barbara Ess's Just Another Asshole show and subsequent compilation projects and Colab's organization of The Real Estate Show, The Times Square Show, and the Island of Negative Utopia show at The Kitchen.

No wave art found an ongoing home on the Lower East Side with the establishment of ABC No Rio Gallery in 1980, and a no wave punk aesthetic was a dominant strand in the art galleries of the East Village (from 1982 to 1986).

In 2023, the visual arts of no wave was featured at the Paris Centre Pompidou in a Nicolas Ballet curated exhibition entitled Who You Staring At: Visual culture of the no wave scene in the 1970s and 1980s. Video interviews documenting no wave aesthetics were held and published online at the Pompidou website.

== Legacy ==
In a foreword to the book No Wave, Weasel Walter wrote of the movement's ongoing influence:

I began to express myself musically in a way that felt true to myself, constantly pushing the limits of idiom or genre and always screaming "Fuck You!" loudly in the process. It's how I felt then and I still feel it now. The ideals behind the (anti-) movement known as No Wave were found in many other archetypes before and just as many afterwards, but for a few years around the late 1970s, the concentration of those ideals reached a cohesive, white-hot focus.

Swans and Sonic Youth, both considered pioneering bands in the development of noise rock, alternative rock, and several subgenres of heavy metal, were originally inspired by and members of the no wave scene in New York.

In 2004, Scott Crary made the documentary Kill Your Idols, including such no wave bands as Suicide, Teenage Jesus and the Jerks, DNA and Glenn Branca as well as bands influenced by no wave, including Sonic Youth, Swans, Foetus and others.

In 2007–2008, three books on the scene were published: Stuart Baker's (editor) Soul Jazz Records New York Noise (with photographs by Paula Court), Marc Masters' Black Dog Publishing No Wave (with a foreword by Weasel Walter), and Thurston Moore and Byron Coley's Harry N. Abrams No Wave: Post-Punk. Underground. New York. 1976–1980 (for which Lydia Lunch wrote the Introduction).

Coleen Fitzgibbon and Alan W. Moore created a short film in 1978 (finished in 2009) of a New York City no wave concert to benefit Colab titled X Magazine Benefit, documenting performances by DNA, James Chance and the Contortions, and Boris Policeband. Shot in black and white and edited on video, the film captured the gritty look and sound of the music scene during that era. In 2013, it was exhibited at Salon 94, an art gallery in New York City.

In 2023, the No Wave movement received institutional recognition at the Centre Pompidou with a Nicolas Ballet curated exhibition entitled Who You Staring At: Culture visuelle de la scène no wave des années 1970 et 1980 (Visual culture of the no wave scene in the 1970s and 1980s). Musical performances and three recorded conversations with No Wave artists were included as part of the exhibition.

In 2026, No New York: A Memoir of No Wave and the Women Who Shaped the Scene, a memoir by Adele Bertei, the organist for the Contortions and Brian Eno’s assistant, was published by Beacon Press.

== Regional scenes ==
=== Kansai no wave ===
Kansai no wave was a music scene centered around Osaka, Kobe, Kyoto and other parts of the Kansai region in the late 1970s and early 1980s. The scene consisted of Japanese punk and noise music artists which included Aunt Sally, Inu, Ultra Bide members Hide and Jojo Hiroshige, and SS. The movement later influenced the development of the Japanoise scene.

=== Chicago no wave ===
Chicago no wave was a music scene based in Chicago, Illinois during the early-to mid 1990s. The term was coined by Weasel Walter of the Flying Luttenbachers who began describing bands he played with as "Chicago no wave" in reference to New York City no wave. Other notable acts included Scissor Girls, U.S. Maple, and Brise-Glace.

== Music compilations ==
- No New York (1978) Antilles, (2006) Lilith, B000B63ISE
- Just Another Asshole #5 (1981) compilation LP (CD reissue 1995 on Atavistic # ALP39CD), producers: Barbara Ess and Glenn Branca
- Noise Fest Tape (1982) TSoWC, White Columns
- Speed Trials (1984) Homestead Records HMS-011
- All Guitars (1985) Tellus Audio Cassette Magazine #10, Harvestworks
- N.Y. No Wave (2003) ZE France B00009OKOP
- New York Noise (2003) Soul Jazz Records B00009OYSE
- New York Noise, Vol. 2 (2006) Soul Jazz B000CHYHOG
- New York Noise, Vol. 3 (2006) Soul Jazz B000HEZ5CC

== Documentary films ==
- Scott Crary, Kill Your Idols
- Céline Danhier, Blank City
- Coleen Fitzgibbon and Alan W. Moore, X Magazine Benefit
- Ericka Beckman, 135 Grand Street, New York, 1979

== See also ==
- Tier 3, short-lived no wave Tribeca nightclub
- Pyramid Club, no wave-related East Village, Manhattan nightclub
- Mudd Club, no wave Tribeca nightclub

== Sources ==
- Masters, Marc (2007). No Wave. London: Black Dog Publishing. ISBN 978-1-906155-02-5.
- Nickleson, Patrick (2023). The Names of Minimalism: Authorship, Art Music, and Historiography in Dispute. University of Michigan Press. ISBN 9780472903009.
- Pearlman, Alison (2003). Unpackaging Art of the 1980s. Chicago: University of Chicago Press.
- Reynolds, Simon (2005). "Contort Yourself: No Wave New York". Rip It Up and Start Again: Post-punk 1978–84. London: Faber and Faber, Ltd. pp. 139–157.
