= McDermott & McGough =

American visual artist duo

McDermott & McGough. Portrait of the Artists (with Top Hats), 1865. 1991. Platinum print. 14 x 11 inches.

McDermott & McGough consists of American visual artists David McDermott (born 1952) and Peter McGough (born 1958). McDermott & McGough emerged from the downtown New York scene of the 1980s. They are known for their work in painting, photography, sculpture and film.

== Life and career ==
David McDermott was born in 1952 in Hollywood, California. He studied at Syracuse University from 1970 to 1974. Peter McGough was born in 1958 in Syracuse, and studied at the same university in 1976. Their paths did not cross until both moved to New York City some years later.

In 1980, the two met while attending a New Wave Vaudeville show at Irving Plaza in New York City. A few weeks later, McGough attended a dinner party at McDermott's apartment on Avenue B and was immediately enthralled with his 1920s-style living. They became lovers and collaborated on paintings, photographs, films and sculpture as McDermott & McGough.

As a couple, McDermott & McGough dressed, lived and worked as "men about town" in the early 1900s. They dressed in Edwardian era clothes, drove a 1913 Model-T Ford and avoided modern technology. They lived in a converted a townhouse on Avenue C in New York City's East Village, which was lit only by candlelight, to its authentic mid-19th century ideal. "We were experimenting in time," says McDermott, "trying to build an environment and a fantasy we could live and work in." Although their romantic relationship ended in 1985 due to McDermott's affairs, they continued to work together.

McDermott & McGough emerged from Manhattan's East Village art scene of the 1980s, along with such contemporaries as Keith Haring, Jean-Michel Basquiat, Peter Halley, and Jeff Koons. Very much in part thanks to the support of artist Julian Schnabel, McDermott & McGough were then accepted by established art galleries and dealers.

McDermott & McGough are best known for using alternative historical processes in their photography, particularly the 19th-century techniques of cyanotype, gum bichromate, platinum and palladium. Among the subjects they approach are popular art and culture, religion, medicine, advertising, fashion and sexual behavior.

For a time, McDermott worked for the writer/artist Michael McKenzie as an MC on a bus that went to his performance club EXILE, singing songs and telling jokes in the manner of vaudeville.

In 1992, the I.R.S. showed up at the duo's studio because they had overdue bills and owed six figures in back taxes. Their Oak Hill, New York property was taken by the government, and its contents were put up for auction. They lost their automobiles and their Brooklyn studio. Devastated by the situation, McDermott relocated to Ireland in 1994. McGough joined him and he was diagnosed with AIDS in 1997. In 1998, McGough returned to New York because he missed his friends and New York.

By the mid-2000s, McDermott & McGough had revived their careers. However, they ran into financial trouble again. McGough stated that McDermott "lost this big mansion in Ireland and he blamed me."

In 2017, the duo opened the Oscar Wilde Temple in Greenwich Village, meant to be a non-secular sacred space for LGBT people. It was in a chapel at the Church of the Village created in partnership with Alison Gingeras and the New York LGBT Center. In an interview for FourTwoNine magazine, Peter McGough said, "The Oscar Wilde Temple is our greatest art piece ever, because it's not about us. It's a place where people can go who are locked out of the 1 percent of art buying. People who wanna get married will pay a fee, and that money goes to LGBT homeless youth. Those people are our children. These people are my children. They are the legacy of the Homeric, and we're going to take care of them."

In October 2018, the artists opened the Oscar Wilde Temple at the gallery Studio Voltaire in London.

In September 2019, McGough's memoir I've Seen the Future and I'm Not Going was published by Pantheon Books.

== Filmography ==
- Found, 1928, which was filmed with a silent crank moving camera in and about Dublin, including the gardens of The Irish Museum of Modern Art.
- Alice Campbell's Hollywood, which showed at the 1991 Whitney Biennial.
- If You Had Been The Moon, which was set in a 1930s Manhattan skyscraper, the story revolves around two young men who meet while filming a screen test. The main character becomes enamored by the other actor and in his hopeless desire and longing for him, puts his feelings on paper.
- Mean to Me, which was set during the Great Depression in a Manhattan skyscraper, a young woman is surprised by her lover when he tells her of his intention to end their relationship so that he can marry another. In the heat of an argument, she knocks him unconscious, extorts money from him, and in her anger and desperation, forces a tragic outcome. The cast includes Agyness Deyn and Linus Roache.

== Select exhibitions ==
McDermott & McGough's work has appeared in solo and group exhibitions at such institutions as Cheim & Read, Galerie Jérôme de Noirmont, Pat Hearn Gallery, Massimo Audiello Gallery, Galleria Gian Enzo Sperone, Galerie Bruno Bischofberger, Frankfurter Kunstverein, Whitney Museum of American Art, New Museum of Contemporary Art, Centre Pompidou and the Irish Museum of Modern Art. Previous exhibitions also include the Whitney Biennial, New York, in 1987, 1991 and 1995. In 1997, McDermott & McGough mounted a mid-career retrospective at the Provincial Museum voor Moderne Kunst, Oostende, Belgium.
