= Amos Poe =

American film director (1949–2025)

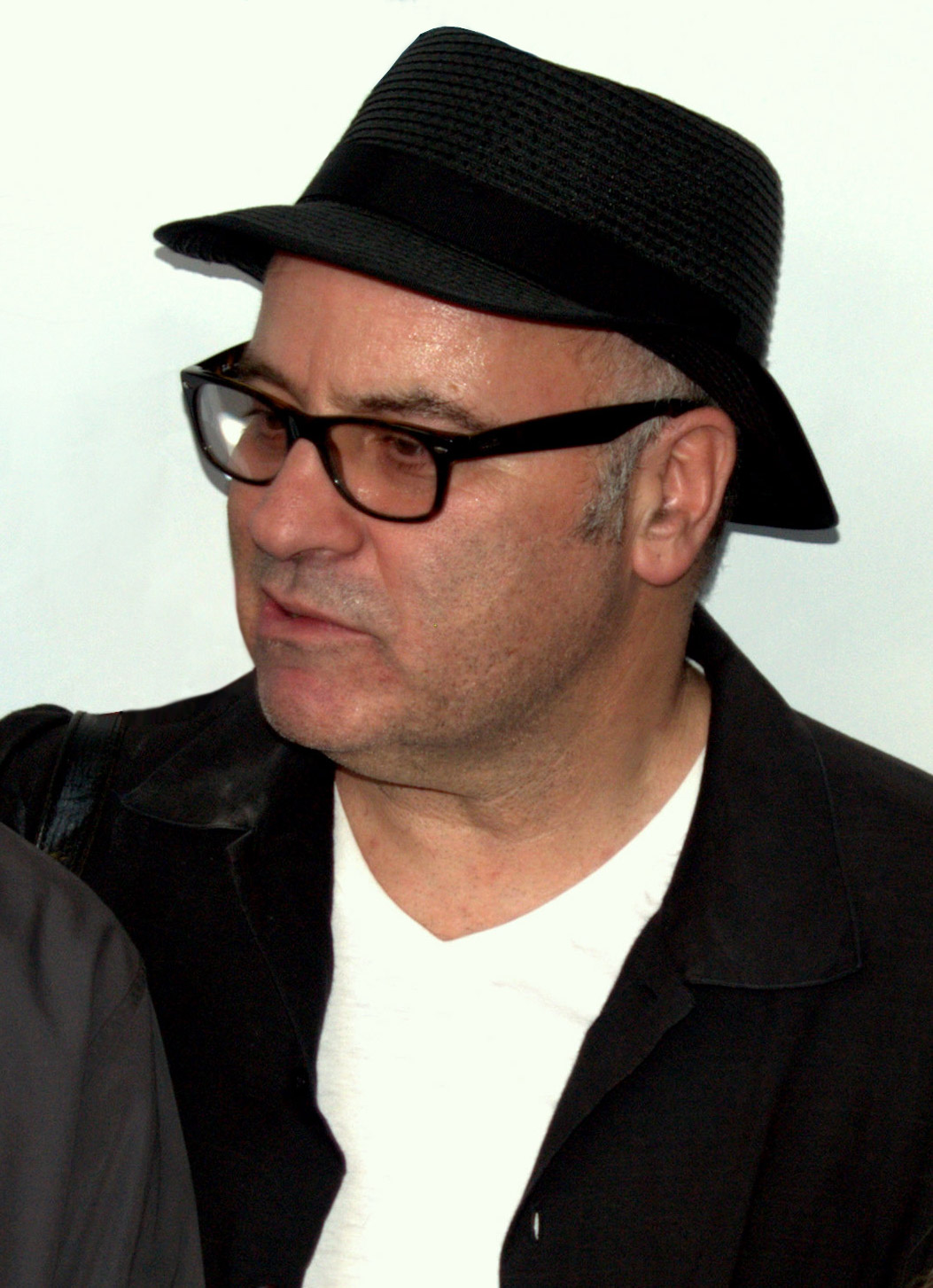
- Poe in 2009
- Born: Amos Porges; September 30, 1949; Tel Aviv, Israel
- Died: December 25, 2025 (aged 76); New York City, U.S.
- Occupations: Film director, writer
- Spouses: Barbara Brooks (m. 1972–1979) Sarah Charlesworth (m. 1983–2010) Claudia Summers (m. 2019)
- Children: 3

Amos Poe (born Amos Porges; September 30, 1949 – December 25, 2025) was an American New York City-based No Wave director and screenwriter, described by The New York Times as a "pioneering indie filmmaker".

== Early years ==
Poe was born Amos Porges on September 30, 1949, in Tel Aviv, where his parents had immigrated from Europe. His family moved to East Meadow, New York, when he was eight years old. He attended the State University of New York at Buffalo, but dropped out in 1972, the year he married Barbara Brooks. By that time he had changed his surname to Poe.

== Career ==
Amos Poe was one of the first punk filmmakers and his film The Blank Generation (1976)—co-directed with Ivan Král— is one of the earliest punk films. The film features performances by Richard Hell, Talking Heads, Television, Patti Smith, and Wayne County. Rolling Stone named it number 6 on its list of 25 Greatest Punk Rock Movies of All Time.

He was also associated with the birth of No Wave Cinema due to films such as Unmade Beds (1976), featuring Duncan Hannah and Debbie Harry; The Foreigner (1978), featuring Harry, Eric Mitchell, and Anya Phillips; and Subway Riders (1981), starring Susan Tyrrell, Robbie Coltrane, and Cookie Mueller. During this time he was also the director of the public-access television cable TV show TV Party hosted by Glenn O'Brien and Chris Stein.

Poe was part of the Remodernist film movement, which he described as the next development of Postmodernism and the transformation of existing cultural features, but "using the technology and the sensibility of contemporary rather than nostalgia". "My idea of my work's importance is to see how it moves the culture to where I'd like to see it", Poe said in a 1981 interview.

In 2008, he wrote the screenplay for the 2008 Amy Redford film The Guitar.

The New York Times reported in 2020 that Poe had lost all ownership of several of his films, including The Blank Generation, to Ivan Král in a 2012 lawsuit over profits from licensing fees for showings of the film. Thereafter, Král billed himself as the director of the film, demoting Poe to co-editor; Král also acquired ownership, for $10 each, of Poe's films Unmade Beds, The Foreigner, Subway Riders, and Empire II. In late 2019, shortly before Král's death, at a screening of The Blank Generation, it was revealed that Král, or his wife, Cindy Hudson, had changed the ending of the film, switching out the original ending (depicting Patti Smith Group guitarist Lenny Kaye), for a brief biopic about Král, followed with the credit "directed by Cindy Hudson". Although the theater screening the film had, apparently unknowingly, marketed it as the 1976 work, it was a considerably different film and Poe's name was excised entirely.

Poe taught filmmaking at New York University's Tisch School of the Arts and at Brooklyn College's Feirstein Graduate School of Cinema.

== Personal life and death ==
Poe's first two marriages, to Barbara Brooks from 1972 and to Sarah Charlesworth from the early 1980s, both ended in divorce. He had a daughter with Brooks and two children with Charlesworth. He married Claudia Summers in 2019.

After being diagnosed with colon cancer, Poe died in New York City on December 25, 2025, at the age of 76.

== Partial filmography ==
- Night Lunch (1975)
- The Blank Generation (1976)
- Unmade Beds (1976)
- The Foreigner (1978)
- TV Party (1978)
- Subway Riders (1981)
- Alphabet City (1985)
- Rocket Gibraltar (1988, screenplay)
- Triple Bogey on a Par Five Hole (1991)
- Joey Breaker (1992) (producer)
- Dead Weekend (1995)
- Frogs for Snakes (1998)
- 29 Palms (2001, murchian engineering)
- Steve Earle: Just an American Boy (2003)
- When You Find Me (2004)
- John the Cop (2004)
- Her Illness (2004)
- The Guitar (2007, screenplay, producer)
- Empire II (2007)
- La Commedia di Amos Poe (2010)
- Ladies & Gentlemen (2012)
- A Walk in the Park (2012)
- Happiness Is a Warm Gun (2015)
