= April Palmieri =

American artist and musician

April Palmieri is an American photographer and musician who performed with a 12-piece all-woman percussion band, Pulsallama. During the early 1980s, the band played at such venues as the Mudd Club, the Pyramid, Danceteria, and Club 57 in New York's East Village. Palmieri's photography from this era, including of Keith Haring and John Sex, has been included in an exhibition at the Tate Liverpool and an exhibition at the Museum of Modern Art (MoMA).

== Education ==
Palmieri received a BFA in 1978 from the School of Visual Arts.

== Pulsallama ==
The no wave art-punk band Pulsallama opened for The Clash's Combat Rock tour several times in 1982 as an all-woman, all-percussion band. Their music has been described as percussive-heavy, crude, and shrieking. Their album, The Devil Lives in my Husband's Body, released on London's Y Records, has been described as a "joke that gets funnier every time you hear it." The song single was described as polyrhythmic, with a narrative that describes a man who howls like a hound and barks nightly in his basement. The song has been called a "post-new wave social satire" of suburban discord. Ann Magnuson, Wendy Wild and Jean Caffeine were among the members of the band.

The band was active from 1980 to 1983; their distinctive sound has been compared to Bow Wow Wow and Bananarama. They performed in cocktail dresses with unusual props and instruments such as kitchen utensils. Jen B. Larson of BandCamp writes that for their first show, "Pulsallama recruited members from the Ladies Auxiliary of the Lower East Side, Magnuson's "twisted version" of a conservative women's civic club — plus [Jean] Caffeine, a practiced drummer from San Francisco punk band The Urge," and Palmieri recalled, "[she] did not know it was an actual band, and missed the second show." They toured Europe and the U.S. East Coast and were known for their "primal, yet glamorous absurdity" and cacophonous stage antics. Their neo-Dada music was both a reflection and critique of the Reagan Era.

The band emerged during the Club 57 Downtown scene cabaret in New York City as part of the tongue-in-cheek "Ladies Auxillary [sic]" at the venue. The band was spontaneously formed to perform at the 'Rites of Spring Bacchanal' event. A writer for NME magazine wrote of their shows, "“I was dancing, screaming and laughing, all at the same time.”

Palmieri was also a close personal friend of performer and downtown scene figure, John Sex, and documented his life during the 1980s. Palmieri, who was a frequent performer at Club 57, recalls that the performance art space on Saint Marks Place was: “an open house to express yourself. We were delighted to let loose and be ourselves.”

In July 2020, the band released a self-titled album of songs recorded live in New York in 1983.

== Exhibitions ==
In addition to performing, Palmieri photographed the punk scene in New York city. Her work was included in the exhibition Club 57: Film, Performance, and Art in the East Village, 1978-1983 at the Museum of Modern Art, NYC (2017-2018). In 2019, Palmieri showed work in the Yesterday's Tomorrowland Today exhibition curated by Ann Magnuson and Alexa Hunter in Los Angeles.

Twenty-five of her documentary photographs of Keith Haring were included in a show at the Tate Liverpool. Her photographic work from that show was later included in the New York Scene/Unseen exhibition at the Open Eye Gallery, Liverpool, along with the work of three other photographers. Her work was included in the MASS: Group Material exhibition held at Artspace in 1986. Group Material was a collective of artists that was active in the 1980s.

== Archive ==
An archive of her papers, videos and ephemera from 1980 to 1990 are held at the NYU Fales Library Special Collections.

== See also ==
- Women in punk rock
