= Lysergic Emanations =

Studio album by the Fuzztones
- Released: 1985
- Genre: Garage rock
- Label: ABC
- Producer: Elan Portnoy; Rudi Protrudi

The Fuzztones chronology
Lysergic Emanations (1985)	Live in Europe! (1989)

Lysergic Emanations is the debut studio album by the American band the Fuzztones, released in 1985.

== Reception ==
Professional ratings
Review scores
Source	Rating
AllMusic	4.5/5 stars
New York Daily News	2.5/4 stars

From contemporary reviews, D.H. of the New York Daily News gave the album two-and-a-half stars out of four, noting that the album "comes close to capturing the charm of a garage band: shouted vocals, lots of guitar, a very weird jacket."

== Track listing ==
- 1985, United Kingdom ABC Records ABCLP4, reissued in 1986 on limited edition picture disc by United Kingdom ABC Records
1. "1-2-5" (The Haunted cover)
2. "Gotta Get Some" (The Bold cover)
3. "Journey to Tyme" (Kenny and the Kasuals cover)
4. "Ward 81" (Protrudi)
5. "Radar Eyes" (The Godz cover)
6. "Cinderella" (The Sonics cover)
7. "Highway 69" (Chandler, Protrudi)
8. "Just Once" (Trash, Protrudi)
9. "She's Wicked" (Chandler, Protrudi)
10. "Living Sickness" (The Calico Wall cover)
- reissued in 1986 in Spain by Enigma Records (#4AD-188) e in the US and Netherlands by Pink Dust Records (#2123-1) with two bonus tracks and a new gatefold sleeve.
1. "1-2-5" (The Haunted cover)
2. "Gotta Get Some" (The Bold cover)
3. "Journey to Tyme" (Kenny and the Kasuals cover)
4. "Ward 81" (Protrudi)
5. "Strychnine" (The Sonics cover)
6. "Radar Eyes" (The Godz cover)
7. "Cinderella" (The Sonics cover)
8. "Highway 69" (Chandler, Protrudi)
9. "Just Once" (Trash, Protrudi)
10. "She's Wicked" (Chandler, Protrudi)
11. "As Time's Gone"
12. "Living Sickness" (The Calico Wall cover)
- reissued in 1992 on 12"LP/CD by Germany Music Maniac Records (included 5 bonus tracks from John Peel BBC sessions)
1. "Bad News Travels Fast"
2. "She's Wicked"
3. "Epitaph for a Head"
4. "Cinderella"
- The iTunes release has an outtake of "Green Slime"

== Personnel ==
- Rudi Protrudi – lead vocals, guitar, harp
- Deb O'Nair – organ
- Elan Portnoy – lead guitar
- Michael Jay – bass
- Ira Elliot – drums
