= Certain General =

American post-punk band

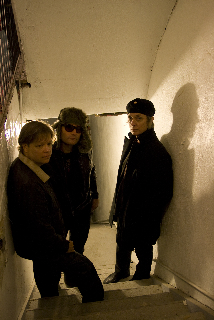
- Certain General, 2008

Background information
- Origin: New York City, U.S.
- Genres: Post-punk, alternative rock, new wave
- Years active: 1980–present
- Labels: Easy Action Records; CBGBs Records; Barclay Records; SourMash Records; L'Invitation au Suicide Records; Labor Records
- Members: Parker Dulany; Phil Gammage; Kevin Tooley
- Past members: Russell Berke; Marcy Saddy; Joe Lupo; Vincent DeNunzio; Sprague Hollander; Robert Palacios; Drew Vogelman; Anthony Di Maso; Lauren Anker
- Website: Official site

Certain General is an American post-punk band formed in 1980 by Parker Dulany, Phil Gammage, Marcy Saddy, and Russell Berke. BOMP! Records has called them "NYC's 80's cult favorite".

In the liner notes for Introduction to War (2001), their former manager, Stephen Graziano, called them, "... the baddest, craziest, most misbehaved but mind bendingly brilliant band that was walking the Earth." This coincides with Mojo magazine's assessment that "the story of Certain General is one of triumph, tragedy, and often dazzling music."'

Drawing on a tradition established by New York rock bands such as the Velvet Underground, Certain General has recorded and performed extensively in the United States and Europe. Although various personnel and label changes have occurred over the years, Dulany and Gammage, along with Kevin Tooley, continue to record and perform.

With one foot firmly planted in the post-punk sound of the late seventies and the other in the emerging new wave, at the outset, Certain General's quirky, kinetic, rhythm and sound owed more to the "dead disco and happening hip-hop," as parleyed by such emerging New York entities as James Chance and the Contortions than the moody, psychedelia-gone-mad direction that would follow. However, from the start, their unique mix of evocative lyrics and a consistently frenetic live show quickly earned the band widespread acclaim when they began to play shows in 1981. As Boston Rock noted at the time, they were "superbly energetic, the last time the band played here the crowd almost tore the walls down." New York rock critic heavyweight Christgau from the Village Voice weighed in that the band produced "rolling, ambitious, somewhat mannered art pop that is totally original." And his colleague, Van Gosse, maintained that "this band so fervent and young has come to stand for something. That notoriety would eventually extend to Europe, where they would release November's Heat in 1984. Considered a seminal album of the 1980s and one of the defining New York rock records, November's Heat would earn the band many accolades, especially in France.

== History ==
=== Origins: 1980–1985 ===
Certain General came together as a band in late 1980 after meeting in Manhattan's East Village. Before playing their first club date at New York's Hurrah, the band had already created a buzz among the downtown Manhattan music and art communities. Loft parties, art openings, and after-hours shows in lower Manhattan served as their springboard and they quickly became one of the darlings of a downtown scene based in the Club 57 social club inhabited by such artists, actors, and musicians as Keith Haring, Jean-Michel Basquiat, John Sex, Wendy Wild, and Ann Magnuson, among others.

Bassist Russell Berke (Carla Bley), drummer Marcy Saddy (Toronto's the B-Girls), and guitarist Phil Gammage (the Corvairs) collaborated with painter and poet Parker Dulany to create a live show that captivated the local New York press. New York Rocker quickly proclaimed them "the most kinetically exciting new band."

By 1981 and 1982 the band was performing in East Coast venues and colleges from Canada to Texas. Early shows found them sharing the stage with fellow New York and Boston bands such as DNA, Bush Tetras, Liquid Liquid, Mission of Burma, Raybeats, and Swans. Their prominence grew as their presence was increasingly felt within the downtown scene and the band found themselves at various times serving as the house band at both CBGBs and Danceteria, venues that are both now gone, but nonetheless remain legendary for the pivotal role they played in the club scene at the time. Certain General were almost synonymous with that scene, becoming ubiquitous hosts at such other venues as the Mudd Club, the Peppermint Lounge, The Rat, 9:30 Club, and downtown's Hoboken, NJ annex, Maxwell's. They would remain staples of this scene for several years. In a review of a show for These Are the Days (1986) at Danceteria, Richard Grabel of the New Musical Express wrote "in a wall of ingenious noise Parker seems like a fallen angel out of a page by Rimbaud."

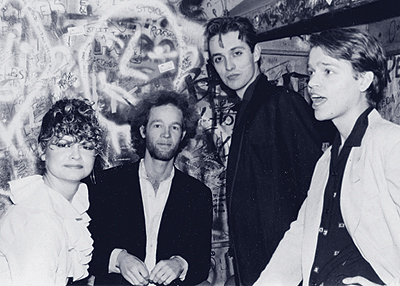
The original lineup at CBGBs, New York, in 1981. Left to right: Marcy Saddy, Russell Berke, Parker Dulany, and Phil Gammage.

In 1982, the group signed with the New York independent record label Labor Records and recorded their debut, Holiday of Love. The five-song EP was produced by Peter Holsapple of The dB's and mixed by Michael Gira of fellow Labor Records label mates Swans, "an interesting pairing if there ever was one." Holiday garnered rave reviews, among them a Trouser Press piece that cited the disc as being created "for all the teenage devils of the world."

In 1983, original bassist Berke would depart to be replaced by roadie and all-around funster, Joe Lupo, and the band would begin work on recording their first proper album. While the bass work of Berke was widely regarded as brilliant, Graziano remarked that Lupo was "the plutonium rod that fueled the Certain General party reactor. During this time, Certain General would catch the attention of British music journalist Kris Needs, who championed the band and later served as their host during their first UK visit. At the suggestion of Needs, Far Away in America (1984) was conceived as a collaboration of sorts and the LP was shared with another New York band, friends and musical colleagues Band of Outsiders. Independently released on SourMash Records in April 1984, it featured two live and two studio recordings by each band. The two groups furthered the co-op approach and toured together in the spring and summer of 1984 in both the United States and the United Kingdom to promote the record. Highlights of the UK dates included shows at Alice in Wonderland (where in his typical exuberance Dulany smashed his hand through the asbestos ceiling) and the Batcave in London, as well as the Hacienda (with James) in Manchester.

The album, coupled with their New York and London performances, would also draw the attention of Chris Parry and his London-based Fiction Publishing. This coincided with a change in management, when the band signed on with Ruth Polsky (the booking agent for New York clubs Hurrah and Danceteria) and her agency, Blind Dates Management. They also began work with the new French record label L'Invitation au Suicide (I.A.S. Records) and made plans to license a newly recorded second LP to the label.

The band leveraged the Parry relationship and agreed to appear in support of The Cure, who were already signed to Fiction, at New York's Beacon Theatre on November 14, an appearance that would be a 1984 highlight. Fans of both bands would maintain that since there was some common ground in the respective sounds of the two bands at that time, the pairing certainly made sense from a musical standpoint. However, their respective positions in the musical pantheon of the day was another issue indeed. Certain General's innate hunger to perform and desire to move forward would serve them well in the context, which became something of a pattern for the band. Rising to the opportunity presented by the Beacon gig, by all accounts the band certainly delivered. David Fricke of the Melody Maker wrote of this performance "Certain General defy equilibrium in their abrasive velvet descended attack and by set's end they are a revved-up dance engine with juggernaut possibilities."

=== November's Heat and These Are the Days: "Nous Voila" ===
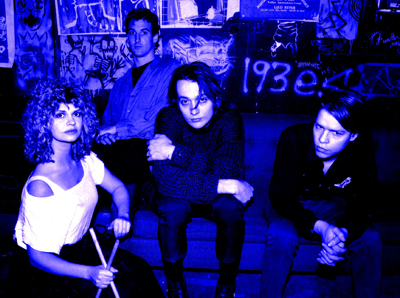
Backstage at Danceteria (left to right): Marcy Saddy, Joe Lupo, Parker Dulany, and Phil Gammage.

Self-financed from earnings saved from performances at New York's Danceteria, November's Heat was released in France in November 1984 by I.A.S. Records. This would prove to be a major turning point. When they arrived in Paris on February 3, 1985, the French daily Libération welcomed the band and marked their arrival with front-page coverage and three interior articles, with a headline above a front-page photo that announced: "Certain General: Nous Voila (We Are Here)." Calling the band "Jim Jarmusch's and William Faulkner's America," and referring to Dulany as "desperately beautiful," Libération declared Certain General "best new band" and awarded "1984 album of the year" honors for the release.

Although the next two years saw the band tour and make television appearances in France several times, within the United States, the group's profile remained primarily underground as they continued to perform mainly on the East Coast. To a large degree this was due to internal differences as to where they should appear: tours on the West Coast and in the South failed to materialize not because the opportunities did not present themselves, but rather, because internal strife prevented follow through. However, their reach on the eastern seaboard can be neither ignored nor discounted and their cultural influence was by no means limited to New York. Whether it was due to one of their regular jaunts at the Paradise Club in Boston or City Gardens in Trenton, with a stop at the East Side Club in Philly on their way to 688 in Atlanta, aside from being merely heard in some of the top clubs of the time, they made their presence known and their impact felt.

The bands with whom Certain General appeared in the early- and mid-eighties is a veritable list of many of the top independent rock bands of the era: Green on Red, Rain Parade, Mission of Burma, Gun Club, Oingo Boingo, New Order, Rank and File, The Rezillos, The Bongos, The Nails, Gang of Four, R.E.M., Pylon, The Sisters of Mercy, Way of the West, Medium Medium, and Raybeats. In the context of playing as the opener, Certain General built a much-deserved reputation for surpassing those they were supporting. They became a force to be reckoned with. In a review of an appearance in Salt Lake City, the Salt Lake City Tribune reported that "after New Order had finished, it was opening act Certain General that continued to resonate in the mind."

While successful in France, November's Heat was not released in the United States until 2000, rather odd considering that the band was covered widely, especially by the much-respected UK music press. At the time, Sounds wrote of their live performances

... they demonstrated that there are still bands around that can deliver the goods without the usual accoutrements of cheekbone image ... Strong on tunes, energy and power; they might not be known at the moment but with performances like this and a glittering debut LP, they will be soon.

1985 saw more personnel changes as Sprague Hollander replaced original guitarist Phil Gammage. In France, I.A.S. Records released the band's next recording project prior to its completion, in fear that they would lose the group to a major label. This "bootleg" would become the infamous These Are the Days and would still somehow win great praise from the press despite the glaring inconsistencies of an unfinished work. Regarding Days, Steve Mirkin wrote "Filled with a dark confidence and narcotic allure ... with a charged confidence and kamikaze edge."

In response to the copyright infringement of the record by I.A.S., Ruth Polsky released a finished single by the band ("Will You" and "Bad Way") on her own New York-based label, S.U.S.S. Records. This success was overshadowed by tragedy when Ruth was killed in a horrific car accident that left her pinned beneath a yellow cab in the doorway of The Limelight club, a converted church in New York, as the band performed there in September 1986. The band would not learn of Polsky's death until the following morning.

After a memorial show for Polsky with New Order and Karen Finley at the Roxy in New York and the second of two tours with New Order, Certain General slowly retreated to Paris to convalesce and reorganize. One can speculate that the fact that TimeOut would later describe Dulany as "the haunted crooner" can be traced to this watershed event.

=== 1987–1998 ===
After again touring France in 1987, Certain General signed to the prestigious French label, Barclay Records (Jacques Brel, Noir Desir) and recorded Cabin Fever. The LP included their best selling single to date, "I Lose Myself," which was cited as "one of the 10 best singles of 1988" by Libération. Based on the success of Fever and the attention it garnered in French press, the group continued to tour and perform in France. In 1990, Barclay Records issued the album Jacklighter, produced by Fred Maher, Gavin Mackillop, and Lloyd Cole. It featured Lloyd and fellow 'Commotion' Blair Cowen on the single, "Baby Are You Rich?" The single fared well, but the group was dropped from Barclay in 1992.

Following the release of Jacklighter the band entered a period of hiatus until the late nineties while its various members pursued other projects.

=== 1999–2009 ===
In 1999, original guitarist Gammage rejoined the band and the group's original line-up re-united to record Signals from the Source in the CBGB's basement studio for Hilly Kristal's CBGB Records. Genya Ravan (the Dead Boys) produced the record. These Are the Days was officially released on France's Fantastica Label and the group played a nationwide tour of France, co-headlining with fellow New Yorkers The Fleshtones.

In 2000, Fantastica released the Arnaud Dieterlan-produced Closer to the Sun, which was recorded in Paris during the 1999 tour. 2001 saw the group issue Live at the Public Theater on its own PreFab International Records. This recording featured a duet of Serge Gainsbourg's "La Decadanse" with Julee Cruise (Blue Velvet, Twin Peaks).

=== 2010–present ===
On May 21, 2010, Certain General released their first collection of new material since Closer to the Sun, released in 2000. The new 13-song CD, entitled Stolen Car, is composed of 12 new songs written by the band plus a remake of their 1982 recording "Hello My God."

Featuring original band members Parker Dulany (lead vocals, bass) and Phil Gammage (guitar) along with longtime drummer Kevin Tooley, Stolen Car continues the band's tendency toward expansive and exploratory rock sounds. Produced by Tooley at his Concept Studios in New York, Stolen Car includes contributions from sax session musician Robert Aaron, a veteran of recordings by David Bowie, James White, and Al Jarreau, among many others.

In a Le Son du Maquis press release from March 2010, Dulany commented on the writing, recording, and producing aspects of this collection:

After thinking about it for the last 10 years, we decided to make good on our threat to make some racket. From the outset we intended that this adventure sit well next to two albums in our canon: November's Heat and These Are the Days. We strove to capture the feeling that no matter how much you felt that you were in control of your life and your destiny, in reality, you were not. Stolen Car is a metaphor for this statement: "Who is driving, please?" In expressing this declaration we avoided all of the usual recording entrapments: No big studios, no outside producer, no instruments of 'sentiment' such as acoustic guitars or strings; nothing that the three of us could not play ourselves. Well almost nothing, as Robert Aaron's sax contributions could not ignored; we are strict, but not stupid. We wrote by committee, arranged by committee, played by committee, drank by committee, and then let Kevin mix alone. So Kevin is the producer, Stolen Car is the album, and Certain General is the band.

The band toured Europe in the spring of 2016.

== Influence ==
Their ongoing success abroad notwithstanding, Certain General's influence continues to resonate in the US. In a review of a gig marking the release of Introduction to War at Don Hill's in New York, Kristy Eldredge wrote in Glorious Noise, that Dulany

embodies subtle but powerful charisma ... and slender scarecrow elegance ... (his) body language is the loosest and he seems to have the most soul. The French don't always choose the most worthy American icons to elevate, but they seem to on to something with Certain General.

On to something they were; in 1999 Libération compared Certain General to the U-boat in the 1981 film Das Boot, calling them "insubmersible." The landscape that simultaneously served as their living room and the ultimate party venue, New York's East Village and downtown, have not been so durable. Replacing the artist's lofts, dives, and backrooms that were their laboratory are the all-too typical earmarks of any modern gentrified locale: the Nine Wests, the Starbucks, the Gaps et al.. Fortunately, in spite of these less-than-inspiring surroundings and unlike most of their peers, the band carries on: Parker Dulany, Phil Gammage and Kevin Tooley continue to perform and record as Certain General.

== Compilations and re-issues ==
November's Heat continues to be issued and re-issued worldwide (Bomp/Alive Records, Fan Club Records, and Commotion Records). In 2001, SourMash Records issued the two-CD set An Introduction to War, which included the previously unreleased album The Dead Rabbit Gang (songs that were to be released after November's Heat in 1985), and a disc of live material, Savage Young Generals, circa 1981–1982. In 2005, Certain General were included in Soul Jazz Records three-CD compilation series entitled, New York Noise, which featured most of the prominent post-punk New York bands from 1978 to 1982. In 2007, UK label Easy Action Records released the only comprehensive retrospective devoted to Certain General, Invisible New York. That disc included a collaboration of "New York, New York" with Julee Cruise and Lenny Kaye, which was recorded in response to 9/11.

== Solo and side projects ==
During his years performing with and without Certain General, guitarist Phil Gammage continued to record and perform under his own name, with several of his recordings being released by the Paris-based New Rose Records. His most recent album is Used Man For Sale (PreFab International, Continental Record Services, 2016). In addition, he has worked as a recording session guitarist and harmonica player. Several of his songs have appeared on television and film soundtracks. Parker Dulany has continued his work as a painter and poet. He recorded a solo album, Mr. Parker's Band, which was released in 1995 on the French label Night and Day Records.

== Discography ==
- Holiday of Love
  - 1982, Labor Records (USA) EP
- Far Away in America
  - 1984, SourMash Records (USA) SM101 LP
  - 1985, L'Invitation au Suicide Records (France) LP
- November's Heat
  - 1985, L'Invitation au Suicide Records (France) SM103/I.D.7 LP
  - 1999, Alive Records (USA) ALIVE0039 CD
  - 2002, Commotion/Fantastica Records (France) FMS120 2 CDs
- These Are the Days
  - 1986, Invitation au Suicide Records (France) LP
  - 2000, Fantastica (France)
- Cabin Fever
  - 1988, Barclay Records (France)
- Jacklighter
  - 1991, Barclay Records (France)
- Signals from the Source
  - 1999, CBGB Records (USA) 004 CD
- Closer to the Sun
  - 2000, Commotion/Fantastica Records (France)
- An Introduction to War
  - 2001, SourMash USA Records (USA) SM201 2 CDs
- Live at the Public Theater
  - 2002, PreFab International Records (USA) PF/FANTASTICA102 CD
- Invisible New York
  - 2007, Easy Action Records (UK) 2 CDs
- Stolen Car
  - 2010, Le Son du Maquis
- Live it Down
  - 2013, World Wide Vibe Records
