= Marc Laurick =

American singer-songwriter (1963–2017)

- Born: August 20, 1963; Trenton, New Jersey, U.S.
- Died: May 10, 2017 (aged 53) Amsterdam, Netherlands
- Genres: Art pop, post-punk, art punk
- Occupations: Musician, bass player, composer, songwriter, singer, producer
- Instruments: Bass guitar
- Years active: 1980–2017

Marc Laurick (August 20, 1963 – May 10, 2017) was an American bass player, songwriter, singer, and record producer.

== Career ==
He began his professional freelance career in Philadelphia in 1980 at the age of 17. He has performed with Certain general, Sensory Fix, Bunnydrums, King Britt, Guillermo Gregorio, Skip Heller, Byard Lancaster, Mose Giganticus, and many others.

In 1992, he founded the Alliance Music Workshop musician's cooperative at Vox Populi, an independent performance gallery in Philadelphia. The Alliance Music Workshop provided an alternative space for music with an emphasis on improvisation and international styles. Some of the more notable performers he booked at the AMW include Jamaaladeen Tacuma, Joe Morris, Khan Jamal, Rob Brown, Marc Ribot, Rufus Harley, Tani Tabbal, and Square Roots (later The Roots). In 1997, he assisted Scott Black with the Frank Lloyd Wright Unity Temple Restoration Fund concert series in Oak Park, IL.

In July 2006, he engineered the return of the Philadelphia post-punk band Bunnydrums with original members David Goerk and Frank Marr, adding guitarist Howard Harrison (of Martin Bisi) and drummer Michael Mongiello to the lineup.

In 2008, he founded witchtrialZ! with Jeremy Klotz, of Sensory Fix, and David Finzimer. After the final performance of witchtrialZ!, opening for Reeves Gabrels, with guitarist Howard Harrison and drummer Adrian Burka substituting for the original members of witchtrialZ!, Laurick formed the band yeah clementines with Harrison and Burka. In 2011, yeah clementines released the EP "Aquarelles", and in 2012 released the LP "Candela".

Shortly after founding yeah clementines, he started the independent label, The China Sea Recordings Concern, which represented Graham Brice (of the Hidden Wool), and Phil Gammage (of Certain General).

In 2012 and 2013, he made guest appearances with Certain General at the Bowery Electric for the CBGB Festival in New York. Also appearing in 2013 were Glen Matlock, Lydia Lunch, Syl Sylvain, Jahn Xavier, Lenny Kaye, Richard Lloyd, Ivan Kral, and Dee Pop. In 2012, he performed with David Guilbault Band at the Burlesque for Barack fundraiser for the re-election of Barack Obama.

His bands have performed with a diverse range of acts, such as The Stranglers, Bauhaus, Psychedelic Furs, Suicide, Urge Overkill, Reid Paley, El Vez, Band of Outsiders, Martin Bisi, Stan Ridgway, King of Siam, Richard Lloyd, Notekillers, Bush Tetras, Ken Vandermark, The Cynics, Controlled Bleeding, and Swamp Dogg.

He recorded with Virgin of the Birds on their album Winter Seeds on Scotland's Song, By Toad label. "Horfes Turn'd Jockies," produced by Laurick and released on The China Sea Recordings Concern on March 15, 2013, is a free compilation of independent artists covering songs by songwriters who inspire and inform their work. His last album, "Tourbillons," was released October 8, 2013.

== Partial discography ==
- with 9Fireman9: "Tar" (1981)
- with Chora Ensemble: "Chicago Blowout" (1996)
- yeah clementines: "Aquarelles" EP (Jan. 2011)
- yeah clementines: "Candela" LP (Feb. 2012)
- "Horfes Turn'd Jockies" (March 2013)
- "Tourbillons" (October 2013)

== Videos ==
- Video: Bunnydrums at the Trocadero, Philadelphia, PA (July 5, 2007)
- Video: Certain General perform "Anew Everyday" at CBGB Festival at Bowery Electric, New York, NY (July 5, 2012)
- Video: Certain General perform "Leader Out" at CBGB Festival at Bowery Electric, New York, NY (July 5, 2012)
- Video: Colin J Nelson at the Columbia City Theater, Seattle, WA (March 2013)
