= Katy K. =

American fashion designer and artist

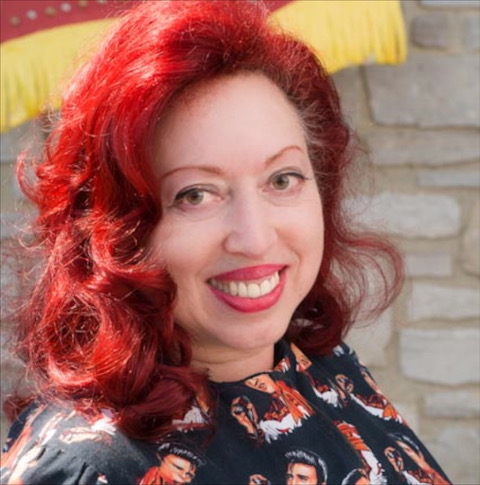
- Born: Philadelphia, Pennsylvania, U.S.
- Education: New York University
- Occupation: Fashion designer

Katy K., (born Katy Kattelman) is an American fashion designer and performer who was active in the New York Club 57 scene in the 1980s. Her fashion line, Katy K's Ranch Dressing, began in New York and operated in Nashville, Tennessee.

== Early life ==
Katy Kattelman was born in Philadelphia, Pennsylvania.

== Career ==
=== 1970s-1980s ===
Katy K. moved from Philadelphia to New York City in 1966 to pursue a degree in elementary education at New York University. She later visited Texas, where she discovered country music and rockabilly style. She started designing western style men's shirts and clothes. She returned in New York City and enrolled at Parsons School of Design in 1978, but never completed her degree. Katy K. found success in designing crinoline skirts. Club 57 opened in New York City. Katy K. was a regular there. Amy Arbus photographed Katy K. and John Sex for her column in The Village Voice, which appears in her book On the Street: 1980-1990. The book is the subject of a 2013 documentary about Arbus called On the Street. Katy K. is featured in the documentary.

=== 1980s-1990s ===
Nicknamed the "reigning Crinoline Queen" in the 1980s by New York Magazine, Katy K. sold her designs at Fiorucci, Screaming Mimi's, and Patricia Fields. One of her petticoat skirts was worn by Whitney Houston in her video "I Wanna Dance with Somebody." Katy K.'s close friends included Joey Arias, John Sex, Keith Haring, and Klaus Nomi.

Katy K.'s time in New York ended in the 1990s when she moved to Nashville. Opened a store in the 12 South neighborhood. Her store, Katy K.'s Ranch Dressing, was one of the first businesses to move into the neighborhood.

Her second annual fashion show at The Gas Lite Lounge included performances and attendance by Joey Arias and Kitten Natividad.

=== 2000s-2010s ===
In the 2001 book How the West was Worn: A Complete History of Western Wear, Holly George-Warren called Katy K. one of "several young American fashion designers in the 1990s who sought to emulate and reinvent the golden age of Western wear."

In 2004, Katy K. brought burlesque to Nashville with her show at Mercy Lounge, called Girlesque V. She originated at Exit/In a few years earlier. She said about the show: "Although the acts can be sexy, they are more a celebration of feminine charms, not a pandering to male patrons."

Katy K.'s Ranch Dressing had to close due to rising rent costs in May 2015.

She was a regular at Club 57 on St. Marks in the 1980s. MoMA curated a show about Club 57 in late 2017.
