= Kenny and the Kasuals =

American rock band

- Also known as: Kenny Daniel Combo
- Origin: Dallas, Texas, United States
- Genres: Garage rock; psychedelic rock
- Years active: 1964–1967; 1981–2019
- Labels: Mark; United Artists
- Past members: Kenny Daniel; Lee Lightfoot; Jon D. "Bird" Blachley, M.D.; Jerry Smith; Paul Roach; Tom Nichols; Alan McDaniel; Gregg Daniel; Dirk Gabrileson; Dan Hoden; Rollie Anderson; Dan Green; Tedd Brumm

Kenny and the Kasuals were an American garage rock band formed in Dallas, Texas in 1964. The band played at various venues, including the Studio Club, with a repertoire that consisted of material taken from the British Invasion and R&B standards. Over time the band began experimenting with early elements of psychedelic music and are often cited as one of the first groups to play in such a style. Kenny and the Kasuals released several singles including their best-known song, "Journey to Tyme". A live album, Impact, was also recorded in 1966.

== History ==
Encouraged by his father, a former big band leader in the 1930s, Kenny Daniel (rhythm guitar, backing vocals) formed the first line-up of Kenny and the Kasuals in 1964 with high school classmate Tommy Nichols (lead guitar, lead vocals) who began jamming with Daniel at his home. Known early on as the Ilusions Combo, the duo was joined by neighborhood friends Blaine Young (drums) and Charles Beverly (bass guitar) to perform for small-time local events. Daniel and Nichols, however, were forced to restructure the line-up later in the same year after Young joined the Marines. Young contracted meningitis while serving and died at the age of 19, And Beverley expressed no desire to tour with the band.

Taking over as frontman, Daniel put together another variation of the group, this time with the name Kenny Daniel's Combo, with guitarist Jerry Smith and bassist Lee Lightfoot, former members of rival band the Vibrations, as well as Jon David "Bird" Blachley (drums) and Paul Roach (keyboards). Daniel and Smith knew Dallas businessman Rick Norwood, leading to frequent gigs at his hotel club and an opportunity for the band to hone their skills as musicians. Soon after, Mark Lee introduced himself to the group at another nearby club with an offer to take on management duties for them. Not much older than the band members, Lee nonetheless sensed potential in Kenny Daniel's Combo and saw an opportunity to cash in on the craze caused by the Beatles. He renamed the group Kenny and the Kasuals and dropped Nichols, making Daniel the face of the band.

Lee methodically promoted the band to the public; "He researched the Beatles and tried to do the same thing with us", Daniel recalled, "He dressed us up in white satin pants with blue blazers and introduced us to Dallas media. We bought all new Vox equipment, because that’s what the Beatles used". Neatly dressed in matching suits and ties to emulate the Fab Four, Kenny and the Kasuals began to appear at more high-profile venues in Dallas such as the Three Thieves and the Studio Club, but also embarked on a tour in Oklahoma and Louisiana in 1965. The band had several residencies at the Studio Club, a newer venue popular in Dallas's teen scene, and opened for nationally successful acts. Sonny and Cher, the Rolling Stones, the Beach Boys, and the Buckinghams among others, shared the bill with Kenny and the Kasuals. In addition, the band became a favorite on Sump N' Else, a regional version of the American Bandstand television show hosted by Ron Chapman. All the while, the group continued to rehearse their material until they felt competent enough to enter the recording studio for the first time.

The band recorded and released their debut single "Nothin' Better to Do" late in 1965 for Lee's own label, Mark Records; "Don't Let Your Baby Go" and "It's All Right" followed. Based on their self-penned releases, music historian Richie Unterberger described the group as "too accomplished to be called a garage band in the usual sense of the term". In 1966, Kenny and the Kasuals decided to record a live album at the Studio Club – in actuality, not entirely live, by the band's own admission it was recorded mostly at Robin Hood's Studio in Tyler, Texas with crowd noises from the club added in. The results were released as The Impact Sounds of Kenny and the Kasuals Recorded Live at the Studio Club on a limited 500-copy pressing. Known by collectors simply as Impact, an original version of the album was described by Rolling Stone magazine as "one of the most collectible American albums" ever distributed.

The same year, Smith and Lee co-wrote the song "Journey to Tyme" when the band was afforded additional time in the studio. Around the same time, Lightfoot, who was recently introduced to the Who's music, shared his enthusiasm with the band by purchasing a fuzz tone pedal for use in the recording of the new song. He relied heavily on distorting the sound of his bass on "Journey to Tyme"; coupled with its existentialist concept, the song is considered one of the earliest – if not the first – songs to incorporate elements of psychedelic music. Local deejay Jimmy Rabbit, in the studio during recording, was impressed by "Journey to Tyme" and played an acetate of the song at his radio station. United Artists negotiated a deal with Kenny and the Kasuals to distribute the song nationally; it became a Top 10 hit in Dallas and the Northeast not long after.

Encouraged by their success, the band relocated to Greenwich Village in New York City in 1967. There, Kenny and the Kasuals began receiving concert offers while United Artists presented the group with an enormous opportunity: Kenny and the Kasuals would share the bill with the Beatles at Shea Stadium. The band was listed to appear; however, in a last-minute decision, United Artists banned the group when Lee refused to give the label exclusive publishing rights. Kenny and the Kasuals released one final single, "See-Saw Ride", but disbanded in mid-1967 after Daniel was drafted. Before Daniel was deployed to Germany, the band reunited for a final show called "The Flower Fair" in April 1968, which was received positively by the audience.

In the late 1970s, Daniel reformed Kenny and the Kasuals, abandoning the psychedelic sound that characterized the early incarnation of the band in favor of a punk rock-oriented act. The Impact album was heavily bootlegged across Europe and Japan, leading to an official reissue of the recording in 1977. The new band took advantage of the revival of their music by touring as openers for such acts as Patti Smith, Iggy Pop, and The Boomtown Rats. In the 1980s, the original members began to leave Kenny and the Kasuals. The final recorded appearance of the original band was a 1985 live television broadcast of the 20th anniversary of the afternoon dance show "Sump'N Else" ( WFAA TV, Dallas ) with radio/TV giant Ron Chapman. Kenny went on to form other variations of the group that performed well into the 2010s.

Cover versions of "Journey to Tyme" were released by garage rock revival band the Fuzztones on their debut studio album, Lysergic Emanations, in 1985, as well as by the Time Beings on their 2007 CD entitled Journey to Tyme with The Time Beings on dino Records.

The final incarnation of the band, with Daniel as the only original member dissolved in 2018 as a result of Kenny's deteriorating health. Kenny Daniel died on November 22, 2021, aged 75, after suffering from dementia.

== Members ==
- Kenny Daniel – rhythm guitar, vocals
- Tommy Nichols – lead guitar | harmonica vocals
- Jerry Smith (replaced Nichols) – guitar
- Lee Lightfoot – bass guitar
- Jon David "Bird" Blachley – percussion -drums
- Paul Roach – keyboards
- Richard Borgens ( replaced Smith ) – guitar
- Mikell Nelson ( replaced Borgens ) – guitar
- Keith Hubbard saxophone

== Discography ==
=== Singles ===
- "Nothin' Better to Do" b/w "Floatin'" – Mark Records ( M-911), 1965
- "Don't Let Your Baby Go" b/w "The Best Thing Around" – Mark Records (M-1002), 1965
- "It's All Right" b/w "You Make Me Feel So Good" – Mark Records (MR-1003), 1966
- "Journey to Tyme" b/w "I'm Gonna Make It" – United Artists (UA 50-085), 1966
- "Raindrops to Teardrops" b/w "Strings of Time" – Mark Records (MR-1004), 1966
- "See-Saw Ride" b/w "As I Knew" – Mark Records (MR-1008), 1967

=== Albums ===
- The Impact Sound of Kenny and the Kasuals Live at the Studio Club – Mark Records, 1966
- Teen Dreams – Mark records LP 6000, 1970
- Nothin Better to Do- Eva Records # 12011, 1978
- Things Are Getting Better -Eva Records #12031, 1978
- Kenny and the Kasuals = Garage kings " – Mark records LP 7000, 1979
- No Exit -Kasual Records, 1981
- The Real Band in Real Time- 14 Live recordings from 1982 and 1988. Only 300 LPs-Mark Records 800, 2020
- The Real Band in Real Time CD- 19 live recordings from 1982 to 1988. Mark Records CD8000, 2020
- IMPACT CD with Journey to Tyme bonus tract, Mark Records CD 5000, 2021
