= Pulsallama =

American rock band

- Origin: New York City
- Genres: No wave; post-punk; art punk
- Years active: 1981–1983
- Label: Y Records
- Past members: Ann Magnuson; Wendy Wild; April Palmieri; Jean Caffeine; Kimberly Davis; Stacey Elkin; Dany Johnson; Katy K; Diana Lillig; Lori Montana; Charlotte Slivka; Min Thometz; Andé Whyland; Judy Streng

Pulsallama was an all-woman, no wave band from New York. Described as "13 girls fighting over a cowbell", the post-punk group was primarily a percussion ensemble with two bass guitars and several vocalists. The band was formed in early 1981 from the Ladies Auxiliary of the Lower East Side, a performance art group that had its beginnings at Club 57. Ann Magnuson, Wendy Wild, and April Palmieri were among the members of the band.

Pulsallama toured the United Kingdom and the U.S. East Coast, opening for The Clash during their Combat Rock tour. The video for Pulsallama's 1982 song "The Devil Lives in my Husband's Body" was in rotation on MTV. Pulsallama released two singles with Y Records, one in 1982 and one in 1983. Their sole full-length album was never released and they played their last show in July 1983. A seven-song self-titled EP, originally recorded for a French radio broadcast, was released in 2020.

== History ==
=== Origins ===
Pulsallama emerged from the downtown scene of New York City's Lower East Side in the early 1980s at Club 57, a cabaret and event space situated in the basement of the Holy Cross Polish National Church. Club manager Ann Magnuson and other women from the East Village had formed a performance art group called the Ladies Auxiliary of the Lower East Side, a twisted version of a women's club that hosted theme nights at the venue, including a debutante ball, a Stay Free Mini Prom, Ladies Wrestling, and Reggae Miniature Golf.

Pulsallama first performed as a 17-piece pagan percussion ensemble in April 1981, during a Rites of Spring Fertility Bacchanal hosted by the Ladies Auxiliary. The name Pulsallama, coined by Magnuson, was a portmanteau of Pulse-Matic, a brand of blender, and llama, the band's unofficial mascot. Dressed in 1950s cocktail dresses, the all-woman band used unusual props and instruments such as kitchen utensils and garbage.

The Ladies Auxiliary of the Lower East Side—sort of a punk rock version of my mother's Junior League group, which I started with some other girls from the East Village—hosted several events at the club. We had a prom, a debutante ball, a ladies' wrestling night. In 1981, I suggested a bacchanal—a night of pagan merriment as spring was coming. So in April we held the Rites of Spring Fertility Bacchanal. We made an altar to a llama, and everyone dressed in kind of Greco-Roman outfits—I wore a toga with sequins. Wendy Wild made magic mushroom punch. We also created a percussive orchestra that was all pots and pans and a lot of racket, and that was the debut of the band Pulsallama

— Ann Magnuson

Pulsallama's initial lineup included founder Ann Magnuson, April Palmieri, and Wendy Wild. Drummer and vocalist Jean Caffeine, who had played with San Francisco punk band The Urge, was one of the few women to have previous experience in a band. Other members of the group were vocalist Kimberly Davis, bassist Lori "Bubbles" Montana, bassist and percussionist Stacey Elkin, Dany Johnson, Katy K, Diana Lillig, Charlotte Slivka, Min Thometz, and Andé Whyland. Mark Kramer, who would later go on to form the band Bongwater with Magnuson, mixed sound for the band.

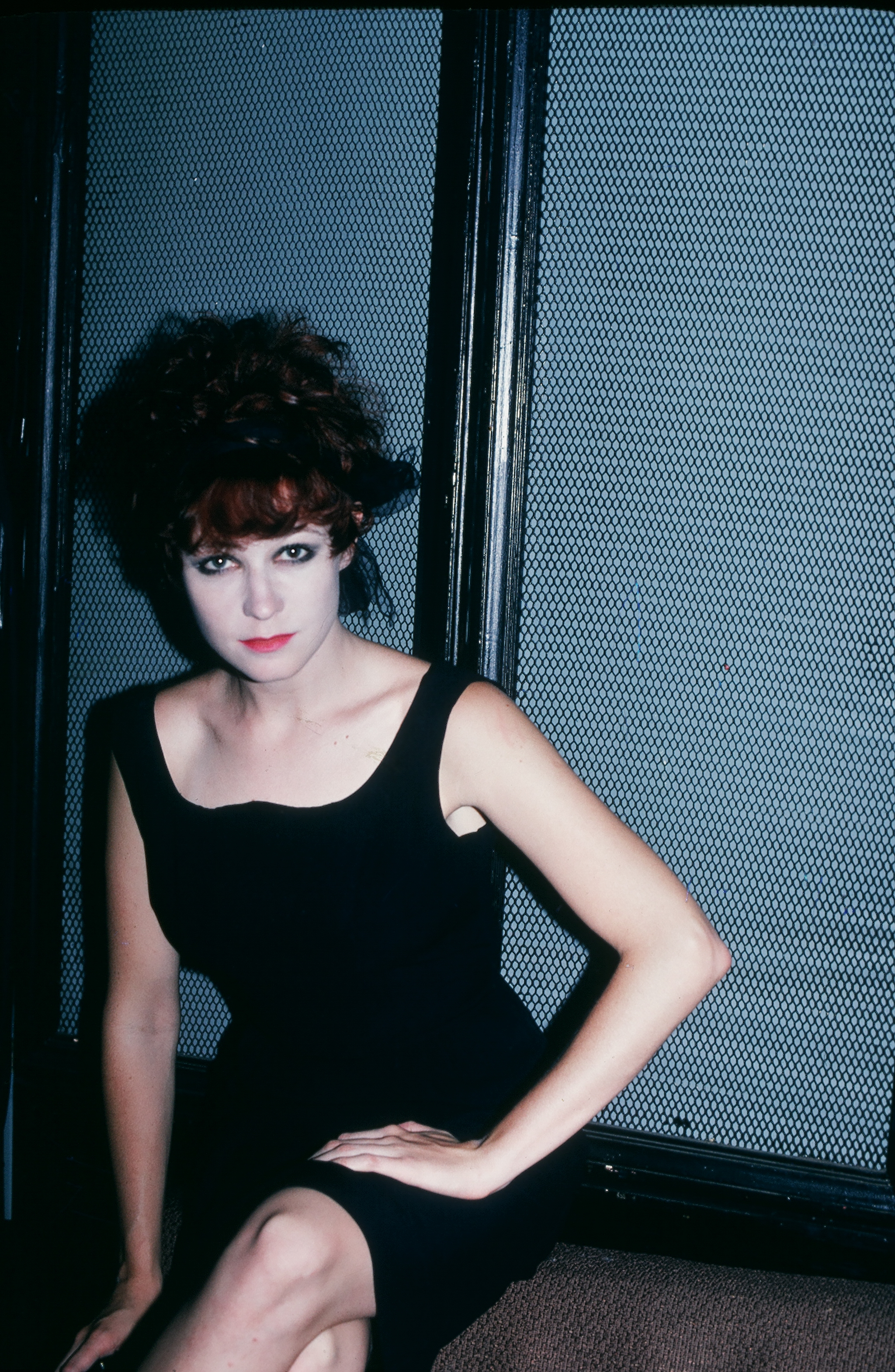
Ann Magnuson was a manager at Club 57 when she founded the group

Pulsallama's performance was well received. They went on to perform at parties and played a show at a rock club that was positively reviewed by New York Rocker magazine and SoHo Weekly News. They had shows at both the Mudd Club and Danceteria. Dee Pop of the Bush Tetras described Pulsallama's early shows as "13 girls fighting over a cowbell."

=== First single ===
After drummer Jean Caffeine met the manager for The Pop Group at a show, he offered to cut an album for the group on the British independent label Y Records. Pulsallama recorded a single, "The Devil Lives in My Husband's Body" with the B-side "Ungawa, Pt. II (Way Out Guiana)", that was released in 1982. It received positive reviews and airplay on alternative and campus radio stations.

Pulsallama lost several members in the months following their debut, including Charlotte Slivka, Diana Lillig, and Katy K. Following the release of the single, Andé Whyland, Dany Johnson, and Ann Magnuson also left the group. Bassist Lori Montana was later replaced by Judy Streng.

=== Tours ===
Following the success of their first single, Pulsallama were invited to tour the United Kingdom where they played a show with Public Image Limited. They also recorded a "Yuletide single" with Y Records labelmates Pigbag. They were noticed by guitarist Mick Jones of The Clash, who arranged for Pulsallama to open for the British band in 1982 during the United States leg of their upcoming Combat Rock tour. They opened for The Clash at shows on the East Coast of the United States, including one at Asbury Park. Pulsallama member Min Thometz recalled that "audience members were throwing beer and coins at us but by the second night, they were kind of rooting for us."

=== Second single, EP, and unreleased album ===
In 1983 Pulsallama released a second single through Y Records, "Oui-Oui (A Canadian in Paris)" with the B-side "Pulsallama on the Rag".

Pulsallama, now with seven members, recorded a full-length album at Blank Studios with Mark Kamins. As Y Records was having financial difficulties, Pulsallama's studio bill went unpaid, and they were unable to pay $15,000 to recover the master tapes from the studio. The album was never released. Frustration with their booking agents and management led the group to disband and Pulsallama put on their final show in July 1983.

In July 2020, the band released a self-titled seven-song EP through Modern Harmonic records. The album was recorded live in 1983 in a New York studio for a French radio broadcast.

== Music, reception and legacy ==
Pulsallama was conceived as an anti-band and a response to the male domination of rock. Their music has been called percussive-heavy, polyrhythmic, crude, and shrieking. They were compared to Bananarama and called a "more chaotic, shambolic, New Yorkier version of Rip, Rig and Panic." According to bandmember Magnuson, Pulsallama were a parody of the English band Bow Wow Wow in particular as well as the 1980s trend in new wave music of appropriating Burundi beats and tribal rhythms. They were known for their "primal, yet glamorous absurdity" and cacophonous stage antics. Rose Rouse, in Sounds magazine in 1982, wrote that "Pulsallama satirize and pulverize. They satirize girl talk, the American way of life, and the rock 'n' roll myth ... and then pulverize the glossy girl image."

Pulsallama's song "The Devil Lives in my Husband's Body" was called a "post-new wave social satire" and an "art-damaged ode to suburban disturbance." The narrative, describing a husband with Tourette's syndrome who howls and barks nightly in his basement, satirized a story from True Romance magazine. A music video for the song, made with Paul Dougherty, was in early rotation on MTV.

Pulsallama were part of the 2017 exhibition Club 57: Film, Performance, and Art in the East Village, 1978–1983 at the Museum of Modern Art. Danny Brown's song "Dance in the Water" from the 2016 album Atrocity Exhibition contains elements from Pulsallama's "Ungawa Part II (Way Out Guyana)".

== Discography ==
=== Singles ===
- "The Devil Lives In My Husband's Body / Ungawa Pt.II (Way Out Guiana)" (1982)
- "Oui-Oui (A Canadian In Paris) / Pulsallama on the Rag" (1983)

=== EP ===
- Pulsallama (2020)
