= John Sex =

American cabaret singer, performance artist

- John Sex in 1985

Background information
- Born: John McLoughlin; April 8, 1956; Long Island, New York, U.S.
- Died: October 24, 1990 (aged 34)
- Genres: Electronic; synth-pop; disco
- Occupations: Singer; performance artist; cabaret performer
- Labels: Sire; Dream; Varla

John Sex (born John McLoughlin; April 8, 1956 – October 24, 1990) was an American cabaret singer and performance artist. He was a prominent performer in the downtown New York art scene in the 1980s and toured with his background singers, the Bodacious TaTa's.

== Early life and education ==
John Sex was born as John McLoughlin on April 8, 1956, on Long Island, New York. In 1979, he moved from Centerport, New York to Manhattan with his girlfriend, Wendy Andreiev, and settled into an apartment on St. Mark's Street in the East Village.

Sex studied graphic design at the School of Visual Arts where he met fellow students Keith Haring, and Kenny Scharf. Sex also befriended Jean-Michel Basquiat, who frequented the campus writing graffiti as SAMO. Sex and Basquiat briefly collaborated on postcards. Describing their shared artistic style, Sex said, "We weren't punks but we had a very punk attitude. We were into outrage." Basquiat later praised Sex, saying he has a "great mind."

Sex lived near German countertenor Klaus Nomi and was shocked by his appearance because he often wore heavy make-up, spike, and leather. Sex initially resisted Scharf's suggestion that he wear makeup before they went to the Mudd Club and pluck his eyebrows. He subsequently embraced a more flamboyant style, arriving at the School of Visual Arts the following September with a blonde pompadour and Day-glo pants, and began creating Pop art-influenced silkscreen posters.

== Career ==
Early in his career, he adopted the stage name John Sex, which was created for him by singer Joey Arias "during a period of rampant promiscuity." However, Sex would later claim that the name derived from his family's name Sexton.

Sex became a regular participant in events at Club 57, where Haring and Scharf and other members of the downtown scene gathered. Soon, he was organizing shows, and became a prominent figure in the club's artistic circle alongside Ann Magnuson.

In April 1980, Sex presented his first successful art show, Acts of Live Art, in which he performed theatrical and often sexually provocative parodies. One performance had him dressed as a matador fighting an imaginary bull. He later recalled: At the time I was very into the Dada movement, and I read about all those Dada artists creating this really fun scene. … So I started putting together some events at the club, like getting people to do things they weren't known for. I'd ask a painter to tap dance or a poet to sing. And I put together crazy burlesque shows. The club was so neat!"

Sex also gained a reputation as a leading poster artist in the East Village. In the summer of 1980, his work was exhibited at The Second Wave, a short-lived neighborhood gallery. He soon stopped producing posters for other people, explaining, "Sometimes the band didn't have a logo or anything and I'd make up the whole image. I was getting real frustrated. … So, I decided to put the whole thing to work for myself. I started making posters of myself and putting them on the street."

Club 57 founder Stanley Strychacki booked him to open for Joy Ryder's band at Irving Plaza and encouraged him to attend bartending school as a source of income, although Sex soon abandoned the training to pursue performing. He would sing songs that were a combination of Tom Jones and Bobby Darin. His performances were initially parodies, but eventually he began to take it serious and got into disco music.

In 1983, Sex described himself as a "new wave snake dancer," and occasionally incorporated his pet pythons Delilah and Samson in his act. The October, Sex performed at Club 181 in San Francisco with adult film star Leo Ford. They simulated sex acts onstage and stripped while Sex sang songs such as "Rock and Roll" and "What's New Pussycat?"

Sex successfully revamped his act, which writer Michael Musto described as "more of a tribute to Jack Jones and Harry Belafonte than Jack Wrangler and Harry Reems." Sex developed a persona that writer Steven Hager characterized as "a glitter Las Vegas version of the All-American kid—a handsome, fun-loving sex maniac with a foot-high shock of blond hair." Sex styled his towering hair using a mixture of Aqua Net, egg whites, Dippity-Do, beer, and Elmer's Glue to keep it upright.

Sex become a downtown New York celebrity, performing at clubs such as the Mudd Club, Danceteria, Paradise Garage, The Palladium, and Pyramid Club. His backup singers, named the Bodacious TaTa's, consisted of female singers and dancers, including Micki French, Wendy Wild, April Palmieri, Katy K., and Myra Schiller.

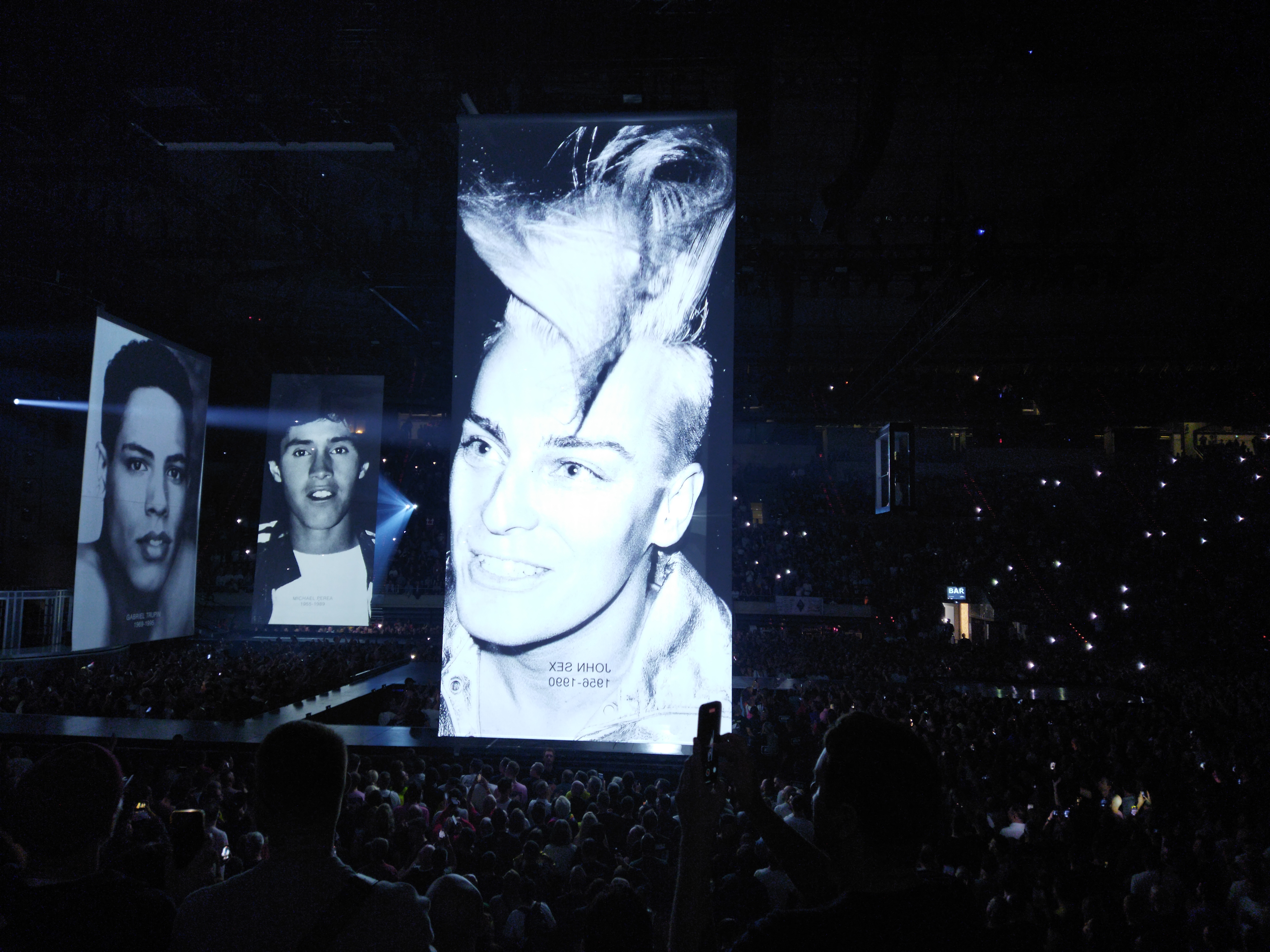
John Sex depicted at Madonna's Celebration Tour in Barcelona, 2023

In 1984, Sex made a cameo appearance as a snake dancer in The Cars' music video for Hello Again, directed by Pop artist Andy Warhol. Warhol later invited Sex to interview musician Liberace alongside writer Glenn O'Brien for the June 1985 issue of Interview magazine.

For the 1986 gay pride march in New York City, Sex organized and helped build a float called the Go-Go Stars, which had go-go dancers from various night clubs dancing on it.

Sex recorded a four-song EP for Sire Records, produced by Mark Kamins and Ivan Ivan, as well as 12" singles and music videos for his songs "Rock Your Body" and "Hustle with My Muscle" and "Bump and Grind It", the latter produced by video artist Tom Rubnitz. "Hustle with My Muscle" and "Bump and Grind It" were released as an A and B side single and this was one of only two releases on Varla Records, a label specializing in alternative New York artists. Sex performed "Hustle with My Muscle" in the 1988 film Mondo New York.

In addition to performing, Sex appeared in nightclubs around the country, including Club Nu in Miami and the Vogue in Seattle. His final public performance took place at New York's Club Mars in 1989.

== Death ==
On October 24, 1990, Sex died from AIDS-related complications at the age of 34. His longtime partner, Wilfredo Vela, succumbed to similar complications four years later.

== In popular culture ==
- Sex was one of the downtown personalities profiled in Radicals in Miniature, a play by Ain Gordon with Josh Quillen of So Percussion, performed at the Baryshnikov Arts Center in May 2017.
- Sex was included in an AIDS memorial tribute as Madonna sang "Live to Tell" during her Celebration Tour in 2023–24.
