= Hurrah (nightclub) =

Nightclub in New York City, US

Coordinates: 40.77056°N 73.98208°W

Hurrah was a nightclub located at 36 West 62nd Street in New York City from 1976 until early 1981.

== Music and videos ==
Hurrah was the first large dance club in NYC to feature punk, new wave, no wave and industrial music. The in-house DJs at Hurrah were Sara Salir, Bill Bahlman, Bart Dorsey and Anita Sarko. Under the management of Henry Schissler, and later Jim Fouratt, it became known as the first "rock disco" in New York, and pioneered the use of music videos in nightclubs, placing video monitors around the club, over a year before the launch of MTV. The club was owned by Arthur Weinstein (who also created The World and the after-hours clubs The Jefferson and The Continental) and his partners, who opened the club in November 1976, months before Studio 54.

With Ruth Polsky as booking agent, Hurrah became known as a place for new wave, punk and post-punk bands to play, featuring many of the British bands' first American performances.

On April 16, 1978, the Tom Eyen comedy play The Neon Woman, starring Divine, opened at Hurrah. It ran for 84 performances, closing on July 15, 1978. Famed New York club doorman Haoui Montaug worked as the doorman for Hurrah.

== 1978 incident ==
The club became notorious for an incident in December 1978, where during a Skafish gig, Sid Vicious got into a fight with Todd Smith (brother of Patti Smith), resulting in the incarceration of Vicious for two months in Rikers Island. David Bowie was filmed in the club for his music video for the song "Fashion" in 1980. Joy Division was scheduled to perform their first-ever US dates from May 21-23, 1980 at Hurrah, but the suicide of their singer Ian Curtis a few days earlier prevented this.
