= Parker Dulany =

American artist

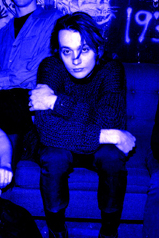
- Dulany as part of the band Certain General in 1983

Background information
- Born: 1957 (age 68–69)
- Origin: New York City, U.S.
- Genre: Post-punk
- Occupations: Musician, songwriter, painter, teacher
- Years active: 1980–present
- Member of: Certain General
- Website: parkerdulany.com

Parker Dulany is a musician and painter from New York City. He is the lead singer and founder of Certain General and has had his work featured in various exhibits, including that of the Museum of Modern Art.

Dulany was born in 1958 in Georgia and grew up in St. Louis, Missouri and New Orleans, Louisiana. He later attended Rollins College in Winter Park, Orlando where he received a BFA in Fine Art. He then moved to New York City and formed Certain General. After his career in the music industry, he became an art and English teacher in Brooklyn, New York.

== Certain General ==
Certain General is an American post-punk band formed in the 1980s. The band was featured at the former East Village music club CBGB. Parker Dulany, the bands previous leader, called it the "Invisible New York" or the "Invisible band". The band's gained notice in Paris, France where they were signed to the French label Le Invitation Au Suicide, who released their album Novembers Heat. The album was named "Best Album of the Year" by several French magazines.

== Featured work ==
When Parker Dulany first arrived to New York in 1979, a piece of his artwork was placed in Club 57, a prominent club which featured the works of notable artists like Keith Haring and Jean-Michel Basquiat.

Dulany's work was included in a Museum of Modern Art exhibit on the East Village music club CBGB. CBGB featured numerous works of his art, which resulted in his inclusion in the Club 57 MOMA exhibit. The Club 57 exhibit, held October 31, 2017 – April 8, 2018, featured film, performance, and art from the East Village in 1978–1983. The exhibition held a variety of artistic pieces which may or may not have been seen through the public eye since the 1980s, including that of Parker Dulany's works of art. The showing held two of his works - a large canvas painting and a print.
