= Mose Giganticus =

American heavy metal/electropunk band

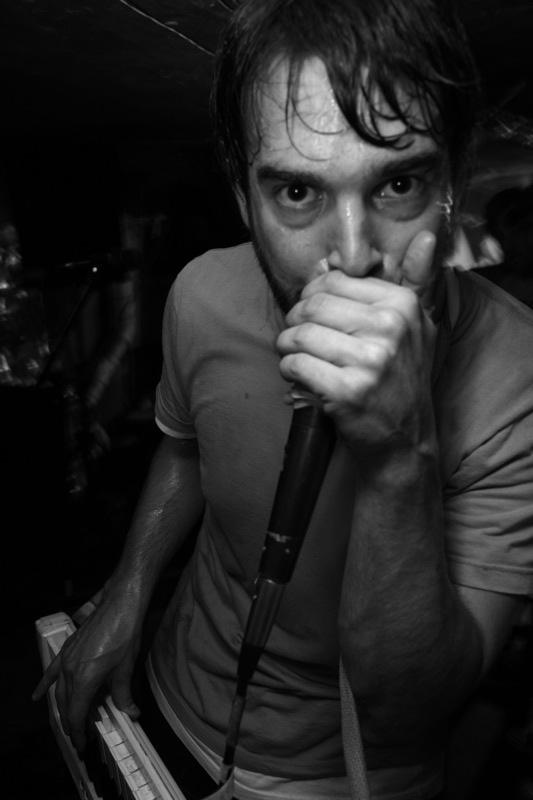
- Matt Garfield, frontman for Mose Giganticus

Background information
- Origin: Bensalem, Pennsylvania, United States
- Genres: Post-metal, heavy metal, sludge metal, punk rock, electropunk
- Years active: 1999–present
- Labels: Independent; Relapse Records; Imminent Threat Records; Slanty Shanty Records; The Cottage Records; Valiant Death Records
- Members: Matt Garfield; Joe Smiley; Christopher Kayfield (Cinematographer)
- Past members: Scott Reigel; Dan Eppihimer; Aaron O'Brien-Eichman; Ricky Culp; Evan Pontell-Schaefer; Steve Jansson; Shane Hall; Curtis Parker; Garrett LoConti; Jeff Newell; Zac Hobbs; Brooks Wilson; Kylewilliam Campol; Kyle Knight; Thomas Smolenski; Dickie Grote; Jon Foy; Jeff Claxton; Andy Kohler; Justin Hickerson; Sam Tremble; Tim Harman; Evan Wall; Jerry Wayne Pickler Jr. Steve Cooper; Chris Grigg; Colin Smith; Marc Laurick; Mat Lutchman
- Website: Official Website

Mose Giganticus is an American heavy metal / electropunk band based in Philadelphia, Pennsylvania, United States, led by songwriter, vocalist, programmer, drummer, and keyboardist Matt Garfield. Originally formed in 1999 as a solo project, Garfield has called upon a variety of additional musicians for live performances and now includes long time contributing guitarist, bassist, vocalist, and recording engineer Joe Smiley as a full-time member. Stylistically, Mose Giganticus is notable for incorporating vocoder and synthesizer into traditionally "guitar-centric" musical genres, as well as for Garfield's prominent use of a modified Roland AX-7 keytar in past live performances. From 2008 to 2012, Mose Giganticus toured North America, including the Yukon and Alaska, in a waste vegetable oil–fueled tour bus assembled and maintained personally by Garfield. After a prolonged hiatus, Mose Giganticus announced the start of the Singles Series, an ongoing digital singles compilation, in May 2016.

== History ==
Garfield, drummer in several Philadelphia-area hardcore punk rock bands, began Mose Giganticus as a solo electronic home-recording project in 1999, playing few occasional live performances. His focus on the band intensified years later, in 2005, with a significantly revamped sound rooted in hardcore punk, while still maintaining prominent elements of electronic music. This effort culminated in the 2006 debut full-length album, The Invisible Hand, a concept record based around humanity's relationship with technology. Initially released on Richmond, Virginia–based Valiant Death Records, the record was followed by several US tours in 2007 with fellow electronic bands Abiku and The Emotron. During these early tours, Garfield performed solo, layering live vocals and keyboards over pre-recorded backing tracks. A compilation featuring remixes from 23 artists of the track My Machine from The Invisible Hand, tentatively titled Our Machine: Remix Collection, was later completed and scheduled to be released on Valiant Death Records in early 2008, but failed to materialize when the label folded unexpectedly due to financial troubles.

In 2008, Mose Giganticus released their second record, Commander!, as a split label release on Slanty Shanty Records and The Cottage Records (who had also reissued The Invisible Hand after the demise of Valiant Death Records). Based on Garfield's fascination with the work of Nikola Tesla, the lyrics focus on the betrayal of Tesla by fellow innovator and former employer, Thomas Edison, and their subsequent bitter rivalry. The record was extensively supported through touring, including trips that took the band and tour-mates The Emotron into the far reaches of Northern Canada and Alaska, where Garfield took 4 weeks to work in a salmon cannery to help fund the tour.

The band's third record, the full-length Gift Horse, was recorded at Skylight Studios with Vince Ratti and released on July 22, 2010, on Relapse Records. Gift Horse displays a decidedly heavier sound than previous releases and centers on the topic of Christian mythology. The record's lyrical content is written in a conversational style from the perspectives of the Old Testament Christian God, humanity, and the deposed angel Lucifer in the mounting tension of the impending Battle of Armageddon.

In late 2011, start-up label, Imminent Threat Records lead a successful Kickstarter campaign to release Gift Horse on vinyl after negotiating licensing rights from Relapse Records. In April 2012, Mose Giganticus completed their tours in support of Gift Horse with their first European tour along with Norwegian noise-rock band Årabrot including performances in Germany, Austria, Slovenia, Italy, and the Netherlands.

On May 3, 2016, Mose Giganticus released the digital single and music video We Are One via their website and social media. The band also announced this single as the first of their Singles Series, in which they will continue to independently release individual songs ad hoc, rather than holding off to compile a new album. On May 9, 2017, the band released a follow-up video single Long as Time. The release of Long as Time marked the official addition of long time collaborator, Christopher Kayfield onto the band's roster under the title of "Cinematographer."

== Discography ==
- The Invisible Hand CD (2006, Valiant Death Records, reissued by The Cottage Records)
- The Invisible Touch DVD (2007, Valiant Death Records)
- Commander! CD-EP/7" Vinyl (2008, Slanty Shanty Records / The Cottage Records)
- Gift Horse CD (2010, Relapse Records)
- Gift Horse 12" Vinyl (2012, Imminent Threat Records)
- We Are One Video Single (2016, Independent)
- Long as Time Video Single (2017, Independent)
