= Ruth Polsky =

American music promoter (1954–1986)

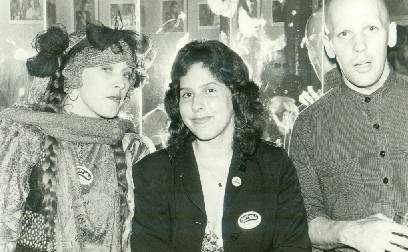
- Lene Lovich, Ruth Polsky and Les Chappell, circa 1978
- Born: December 5, 1954; Toms River, New Jersey, U.S.
- Died: September 7, 1986 (aged 31); Manhattan, New York City, U.S.

Ruth Polsky (December 5, 1954 – September 7, 1986) was a booker and music promoter in New York City.

== Early life and education ==
Polsky was raised in Toms River, New Jersey to Louis and Bertha (Rudnick) Polsky. She graduated from Clark University, where she worked on the students newspaper. After graduation, she began writing for The Aquarian and later moving to London to write about the punk scene.

== Career ==
Starting in 1979, Polsky was talent buyer first at Hurrah and then Danceteria in New York, also promoting shows at The Ritz and booking bands out across the U.S. In this role, she was crucial in breaking many, particularly UK-based, post-punk acts in the U.S., including tours for The Smiths, New Order, Einstürzende Neubauten, The Only Ones, The Sisters of Mercy, The Birthday Party, Cocteau Twins, and The Chameleons. She worked closely with Shirley O'Loughlin at Rough Trade to bring in The Raincoats, Delta 5, Young Marble Giants, Cabaret Voltaire, The Go-Betweens, The Slits and The Pop Group for their U.S. debuts. Other bands that got their first break in the U.S. via Polsky are The Cult, A Certain Ratio, Echo & the Bunnymen, Simple Minds, The Teardrop Explodes, Red Lorry Yellow Lorry, Gene Loves Jezebel, and The Jesus and Mary Chain.

Polsky is quoted after attending Elvis Costello's first U.S. shows, including the notorious April Fools' Day Marathon on April 1, 1979. She wrote an article on Lene Lovich for The Aquarian in July 1979. Polsky booked Simple Minds into Hurrah for a show on October 24, 1979, where the band were filmed by The Old Grey Whistle Test, giving them crucial UK TV exposure.

Polsky booked the Joy Division USA tour in May 1980, which was canceled after Ian Curtis' death. Her efforts were not exclusively dedicated to European groups; in 1981, she brought Big Star to New York for some of their first live dates.

Polsky's close relationship with Stiff Records led to a package show titled "Taking Liberties" at The Rainbow in Finsbury Park on February 21, 1981, featuring New York bands The dB's, The Fleshtones, Raybeats, Bush Tetras, The Bongos, and Polyrock. Live tracks recorded at the show of all except Polyrock were released on a Stiff compilation titled Start Swimming. In 1983, Sonic Youth's Kill Yr Idols recording session was financed by Polsky who "drunkenly" double paid Lydia Lunch for a band performance at Danceteria.

In 1986, Polsky started her own label, S.U.S.S. or Solid United States Support to help British musicians transition to the American market. She managed Certain General from 1984 to 1986, and released Will You on her label.

== Death and legacy ==
Polsky died after being crushed by a runaway cab on the steps of the Limelight club in New York.

"A driver for a car service has been charged with running a red light after his vehicle collided with a taxicab that spun out of control, struck and killed a woman in front of the Limelight discotheque in Chelsea, the police said yesterday. The victim, who was killed instantly Sunday night when the cab pinned her against the front of the building at 47 West 20th Street, was identified yesterday as Ruth Polsky of 90 West Houston Street, according to a police spokesman, Officer Joseph McConville"

Morrissey dedicated The Smiths' single "Shoplifters of the World Unite" to her memory. The Virgin Prunes dedicated their 1986 live album The Hidden Lie to Polsky: "If this is a goodbye LP, then it's a special farewell to Ruth Polsky." On December 5, 1986, New Order played a benefit for Ruth at the Roxy in New York, performing an encore with Joy Division tunes "Atmosphere" and "Love Will Tear Us Apart".

A brief obituary on The ARChive of Contemporary Music website read:

"Ruth was the first to place monitors around a club and play video for the dancers. She had willed her records to the ARChive, but ghoulish record dealers camp out on the steps and buy them off the family."
