= Phil Gammage =

American singer-songwriter

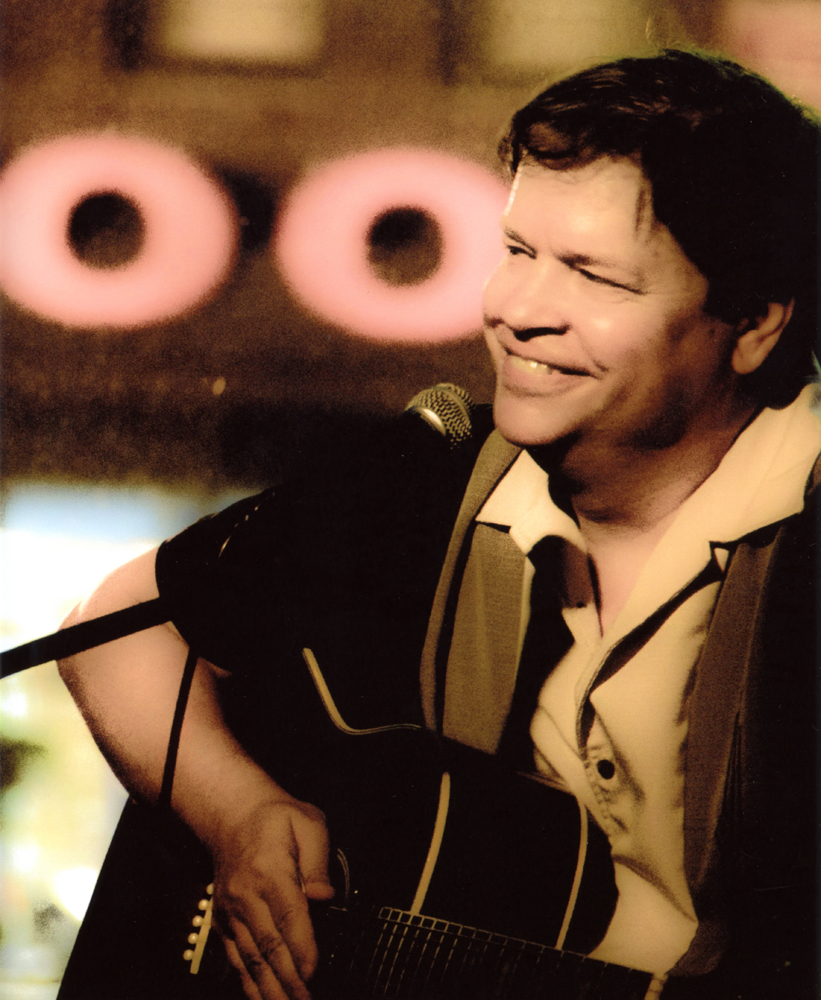
- Phil Gammage

Background information
- Origin: Houston, Texas, United States
- Genres: Americana, blues, rock, alternative country
- Occupations: Musician, songwriter
- Instruments: Guitar, bass guitar, harmonica
- Years active: 1980–present
- Labels: Labor Records; New Rose Records; Alive Records; CBGBs Records; PreFab International Records; World Wide Vibe Records; Continental Record Services

Philip T. Gammage is an American songwriter, vocalist, and multi-instrumentalist. He is best known as a solo recording and touring artist in addition to his lead guitar playing for the New York post-punk rock band Certain General.

== Early years and influences ==
Growing up in Texas, Gammage was exposed to local music styles such as blues, country, and rock. Moving to Boulder, Colorado as a teenager to attend college, he began to play guitar with local bands. Upon college graduation, he moved to San Francisco with his band The Corvairs and for several months played at rock clubs such as Mabuhay Gardens, The Palms, and The Deaf Club.

== Career ==
=== New York and Certain General ===
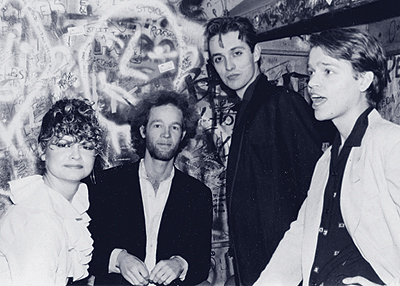
Phil Gammage (first from right) as part of the band Certain General at CBGB in 1981

Gammage moved to New York in the early 1980s, and formed post-punk rock band Certain General with singer Parker Dulany and B-Girls drummer Marcy Saddy. The group soon gained a large following on the East Coast and later toured Europe, enjoying considerable success. Gammage played lead guitar, harmonica, and co-wrote many of the songs on the band's best selling album November’s Heat (1984). The record won many accolades in Europe including "French rock album of the year 1985" from the Parisian newspaper Libération.

Gammage has continued to tour and record with Certain General on a sporadic basis up to the present. He performed with the band at the 2013 and 2014 CBGB Festivals in New York City, and also toured Europe with the group in 2016.

=== Solo career ===
Following their 1985 American tour as opening act for New Order, Gammage left Certain General to focus on his other music projects. He released his first solo album Night Train in 1990 on the French independent label New Rose Records. Kneel to the Rising Sun (1991) soon followed and Gammage made a promotional visit to France in 1991, in support of the albums. Two more solo albums followed later in the decade, Cry of the City (1994, Marilyn/Alive Records) and Lowlife Street (1999, Last Call).

Trouser Press said about his debut album Night Train, "Under wrought darkish Americana echoing Nick Cave's fascinations minus the melodrama… might well make Phil this generation’s Hank Williams."

Gammage made his first ever solo tour of Europe in 2017.

=== Songwriting and recent albums ===
After concentrating on television and film instrumental soundtrack work for several years, Gammage returned to recording with the release of four studio albums Adventures in Bluesland (2014), The American Dream (2015), Used Man For Sale (2016), and It's All Real Good (2019), and From Nowhere to Somewhere (2021). These albums spotlight his original material as well as his renditions of classic blues and country songs. Gammage's singing style on these albums is often compared to American male vocalists such as Johnny Cash, Roy Orbison, Elvis Presley, and Scott Walker (singer).

Rock NYC Live and Recorded wrote about Adventures in Bluesland

I am discussing Phil Gammage’s sweeping modern blues and rock album, which owes so much to everyone one from Presley to Lead Belly, but sounds not quite like any of them… it is really about Phil’s wonderful singing; the man seems to have stepped out of 1957 and yet not. He is a one man Million Dollar Quartet and this is an adventure not to be missed.

No Depression magazine called Used Man For Sale "Gammage’s modern day masterpiece.".

Impose magazine said of Used Man For Sale "Phil’s voice is as unique and smokey-rich as a Johnny Cash, Elvis Presley or freakin’ Frank Sinatra or something. This is pretty amazing...."

=== Downtown Music Collective ===
Phil Gammage hosts, curates, and produces this monthly arts and culture show on the Green Kill Sessions Media Network channel on YouTube. The first episode aired January 11, 2022. An audio-only podcast version of the show was added in March 2022 on all major podcast platforms.

The 20-minute prerecorded program usually consists of Phil reviewing albums and films, performing a song live, and the broadcast of one of Phil's music videos (YouTube version) or the playing of a song from one of his albums (podcast version). The YouTube version of the show often includes exclusive videos and slide galleries of visual artwork.

== Discography ==
=== Solo ===
- Night Train (New Rose, 1990)
- Kneel to the Rising Sun (New Rose, 1991)
- Cry of the City (Marilyn/Alive Records 1994)
- Lowlife Street (Last Call, 1999)
- Adventures in Bluesland (PreFab International, 2014)
- The American Dream (PreFab International, 2015)
- Used Man For Sale (PreFab International, Continental Record Services, 2016)
- It's All Real Good (PreFab International, 2019)
- From Nowhere to Somewhere (PreFab International, 2021)

=== Certain General ===
- November’s Heat (L’invitation au Suicide, 1984)
- Signals from the Source (CBGB, 1998)
- Invitation to War (Sourmash USA, 2001)
- Live at the Public Theatre (PreFab International, 2002)
- Stolen Car (Maquis, 2010)
- Live it Down (World Wide Vibe, 2013)

=== John Sinclair ===
- Keeping the Blues Alive (Live) (World Wide Vibe, with John Sinclair and Adventures in Bluesland, 2014)

=== Compilations ===
- The 4th Adventure (Guiding Light, 1991)
- The Electric Radio Sampler Music Test (Marilyn/Alive Records, 1993)
- Straight Outta Burbank (Bomp Records, 1999)
- New Rose Story Box Set 1980–2000 (Last Call, 2000)
- Motel Songs (Sourmash USA, 2002)
- New York Noise (Soul Jazz, 2005)
- Post Punk (Music Brokers, 2009)
- Rocky Mountain Low (RML, 2010)
- It’s a PreFab World! (PreFab International, 2010)
- Invisible New York (Easy Action, 2010)
- Singles (Continental Record Services, 2016)
- The Second Coming (Aldora Britain, 2021)
