= Haoui Montaug =

American doorman (1952–1991

- Born: March 6, 1952; East Flatbush, Brooklyn, New York, United States
- Died: June 7, 1991 (aged 39); New York City, United States
- Occupation: Bouncer

Haoui Montaug (March 6, 1952 – June 7, 1991) was a doorman of the New York City nightclubs Hurrah, Mudd Club, Danceteria, Studio 54, and the Palladium. Montaug also ran the roving cabaret revue No Entiendes which showcased, among others, a young Madonna and early performances by the Beastie Boys.

== Career ==
At the time of his death Montaug was Panel Director of the New Music Seminar (NMS). Following his death the NMS inaugurated the Haoui Montaug New Music Awards in his honour.

In the late 1980s Montaug was the doorman for the Paradise Garage club and the Tunnel His skills at choosing who went on the guest list at the Garage were described as a "'willy nilly' affair with little logic or reason". Simon Topping of the British dance project Quando Quango had to rely on his banter to get past Montaug and get permission for the group to perform at the Garage.

Montaug's writings appeared in the magazines Details, Paper, and I.D.. In addition to his writing, Montaug appeared in the films Krush Groove, Cookie, and Edo Bertoglio's Downtown 81.

== Suicide party ==
Suffering from AIDS, in June 1991 Montaug invited 20 guests to celebrate his suicide at his loft apartment in the Bowery neighborhood of Manhattan located at the corner of the Bowery and East 2nd Street. In addition to the guests present, Madonna attended the party by telephone from Los Angeles. Montaug had previously introduced Madonna at the performance for her music video for "Everybody" in the early 1980s. At the gathering Montaug swallowed five Seconal barbiturate pills, and went into a deep labored sleep, but kept breathing, to the dismay of the guests. His guests remained until the next morning when he awoke in a fury. Montaug swallowed 20 more pills and died within half an hour. He was survived by his mother and sister.
