= Rudi Protrudi =

American rock musician, artist, and actor

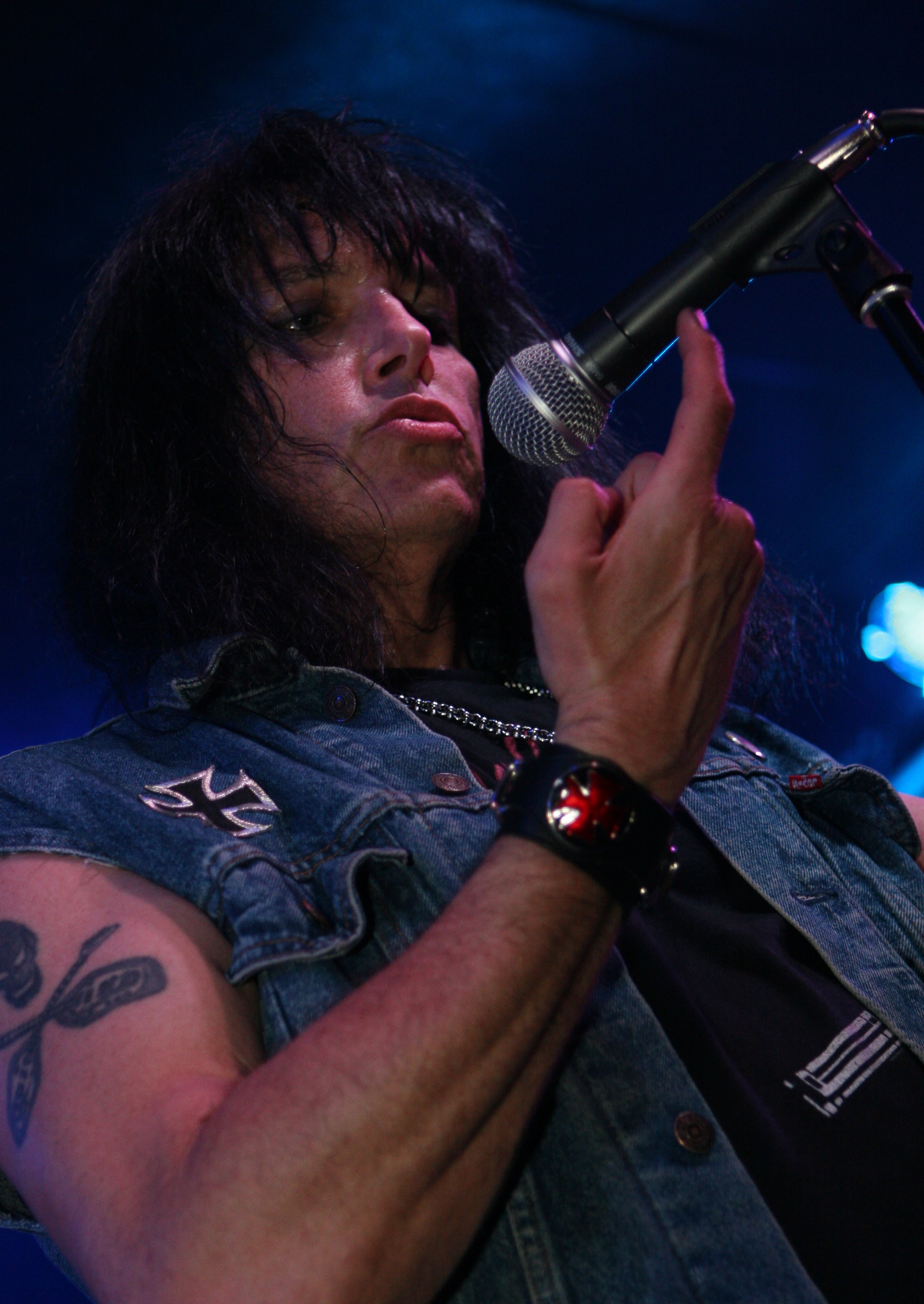

Background information
- Born: December 15, 1952 (age 73); Washington, D.C.
- Genres: Rock, rock and roll, psychedelic rock, blues, garage punk, garage rock, Alternative Country, Exotica
- Occupations: Singer, songwriter, musician, performer, record producer, author, actor
- Instruments: Vocals, harmonica, guitar, organ, bass
- Years active: 1966–present
- Labels: RCA, Music Maniac, Sundazed, Bomp, Electrique Mud, Get Hip, Skyclad, ABC Records, Midnight, Enigma/Pink Dust, Rhino, Wicked Cool, Cleopatra, Radiation, Beggar's Banquet, Dark Zone, Bear Family, Midnight, DRO, Situation 2, Skreamin' Skull, Go Down, Twist, Sin, Easy Action, Houndgawd, Stag-o-Lee, MIG, Misty Lane, Teen Sound, RAFR, Beard of Stars, Soundflat, Dionysis, Beyond Your Mind, Lilith, Third Ear, Vinyl Royale, Bang!, Munster
- Website: rudiprotrudi.com

Glen Dalpis (born December 15, 1952), known by his stage name Rudi Action Protrudi, is an American rock musician, songwriter, record producer, artist, author, and actor best known as the lead vocalist and frontman of the garage band The Fuzztones.

Rudi Protrudi was born in Washington, D.C., and raised in Camp Hill, Pennsylvania. Both he and his younger sister, Rene Laigo, inherited their artistic talent from parents, John and Janet. Rudi attended school in Camp Hill, Lemoyne and New Cumberland, where he graduated from Cedar Cliff High School in 1970. He attended York Academy of Art from 1971 to 1972.

At the age of 12, after seeing The Beatles on The Ed Sullivan Show, rock and roll became his obsession.

Through The Beatles, he became familiar with Chuck Berry, who quickly became his idol. Like Berry, Rudi chose guitar as his instrument, and by the age of 14 had formed his first band, King Arthur's Quart. He continued to play in local bands until 1976 when an audition for the Dead Boys provided him the opportunity to play bass for them at CBGB.

Soon afterward, he founded Tina Peel with then girlfriend/live-in partner, Deb O'Nair and they moved to New York in 1977, where their serious music careers started.

== Tina Peel ==
Tina Peel was a bubblegum-punk band, formed in 1976. Rudi says that this band was heavily influenced by The Monkees, Cryan' Shames, 1910 Fruitgum Company and the Dave Clark 5. It is also Rudi's first band where he performed as frontman.

Rudi wrote or co-wrote the majority of the original material recorded by Tina Peel with then members Deb O'Nair, Jim Nastix and Jackson Plugs. Dave U. Hall (ex-bassist from Birdland with Lester Bangs) replaced Jim Nastix after his tenure with the band. Dave went under the name Rick O'Shea.

Soon, they became a popular New York attraction, often headlining the major clubs of the time (Hurrah, Irving Plaza, Ritz, CBGB), as well as appearing on several television shows, including the cult favorite, The Uncle Floyd Show.

Although the band was courted by major labels and enjoyed frequent press, Tina Peel broke up when members Rudi Protrudi and Deb O'Nair went on to form The Fuzztones in 1980.

== The Fuzztones ==
Originally the Fuzztones were Rudi on lead vocals and guitar, Deb O'Nair on keyboards and vocals, Randy Pratt on bass, and Michael Phillips on drums. In 1983 Elan Portnoy was added on lead and rhythm guitar, Randy was replaced by Michael Jay and Michael Phillips was replaced by Ira Elliot (now with Nada Surf and Bambi Kino). Their first studio LP, Lysergic Emanations, released in 1985, achieved gold record status. The band also released a live album with blues singer Screamin' Jay Hawkins in 1984.

One year later the band toured for three months in the United Kingdom and Europe opening for The Damned, and introducing the 1960s garage/psych sound to a European audience. After the tour the band broke up, and in 1987 Rudi and new drummer Mike Czekaj moved to Los Angeles, where they reformed the Fuzztones. The additional band members were Jordan Tarlow on guitar, John Carlucci on bass and Jason Savall on organ. This line-up toured Europe heavily between 1987 and 1990, and was the only band from the 1980s garage revival to land a major label record deal (RCA/Beggars Banquet). Their album, In Heat, was produced by Shel Talmy. A later line-up (with Phil Arriagada on second guitar and Chris Harlock on bass) recorded the third studio album, Braindrops, in 1991, followed by Monster A Go-Go in 1992, recorded with Jake Cavaliere on organ.

A live album, Lysergic Ejaculations, was released after their breakup in 1992. Rudi wrote or co-wrote the majority of the original material recorded by the Fuzztones.

Among Protrudi's most popular compositions are "Ward 81," "She's Wicked," "Bad News Travels Fast," "Highway 69," "Nine Months Later," "Romilar D" and "Action Speaks Louder Than Words."

Their version of The Sonics's "Strychnine" reached No. 1 in Italy.

In 2000 Rudi reformed the band with founding member Deb O'Nair, and again toured Europe frequently. In 2003 they released the critically acclaimed studio album Salt For Zombies. In 2010 they began their new album's tour. The album, named Preaching to the Perverted, was released in 2011. With Rudi as the only remaining original member, the band is now based in Berlin and is still touring and releasing albums.

Current line-up features Rudi with MArco Rivagli on drums, Marcello Salis on second guitar, Nico Secondini on organ and Pablo Rodas on bass.

== Personal life ==
Rudi's first television appearance was in 1970, when he and his band, Rigor Mortis, played his original composition, "Bandit," on The Weekend Show in Hershey, Pennsylvania.

He made his first record in 1972, a single released by Springhead Motorshark.

In July 2016 he released his autobiography, The Fuzztone.

== Discography ==
| Title | Label | Year |
|---|---|---|
| King Arthur's Quart | Misty Lane Single | 2003 |
| Rigor Mortis – Basementville | Teen Sound Compilation LP | 2003 |
| Springhead Motorshark/Rapa's Schoolgirl | Baldwin Sound Productions Inc. | 1972 |
| Tina Peel/Penis Between Us | Boston Bootleg | 1976 |
| Tina Peel/More than Just Good Looks | 4 song 7-inch EP-Dacoit/Limp Records | 1977 |
| Tina Peel/30 SECONDS OVER DC | Limp Records/Comp | 1978 |
| Tina Peel/Fifi Goes Pop | Teen Appeal 45 records | 1978 |
| Tina Peel/Extra Kicks | Teen Appeal Tapes 001 | 1978 |
| Tina Peel/You'll Hate This Record-Comp Exception to the Ruler | The Only Label in the World | 1983 |
| Tina Peel/Pajama Party | Misty Lane Records | 2003 |
| Tina Peel/Pajama Party Today Is Just Tomorrows Yesterday | Misty Lane Records | 2003 |
| Link Protrudi & The Jaymen Drive It Home | Music Maniac | 1987 |
| Link Protrudi & The Jaymen Missing Links | Skyclad | 1988 |
| Link Protrudi & The Jaymen Drive It Live | Skyclad | 1988 |
| Link Protrudi & The Jaymen Slow Grind | Music Manic | 1992 |
| Link Protrudi & The Jaymen Seduction | Music Maniac | 1994 |
| Link Protrudi & The Jaymen Hit & Run | Get Hip | 1998 |
| Rudi Protrudi & The Others Yellow Green & Purple | Misty Lane Records | 1999 |
| Rudi Protrudi It's A White Trash Thing | Music Maniac Records/Twist Records | 1994/2007 |
| Rudi Protrudi Unfuzzed Live | Hund Gawd! Records | 2014 |
Fuzztones
