= Jim Fouratt =

American gay rights activist

- Born: June 23, 1941 (age 84)
- Known for: Gay activism

Jim Fouratt (born June 23, 1941) is a gay-rights activist, actor, and former nightclub impresario. He is best known for his involvement with the Stonewall riots and as co-founder of Danceteria in New York City.

== Early life ==
Fouratt was raised in a working class Catholic home in Riverside, Rhode Island. He attended the La Salle Academy in Providence. After high school he was accepted into Harvard University but could not attend for financial reasons, instead he began studies at St. Peter's Seminary in Baltimore. In 1960, he was kicked out for homosexuality and moved to New York City.

== Activism ==
Fouratt took up political activism more seriously in 1965, after being arrested in Times Square at America's first Anti-Vietnam war demonstration. In 1967 he was one of the organizers of the famous Central Park Be In. That same year he cofounded the Yippies, a youth-oriented countercultural movement, alongside Abbie Hoffman, Jerry Rubin and Paul Krassner.

Fouratt was at the first night of what he calls the Stonewall 'Rebellion', a term he prefers over "Stonewall Riots."

I happened to be coming home from my job at Columbia Records. I saw a sole police car outside of the Stonewall Inn. I was out in the New Left movement and the anti-war movement and there was an incredible amount of homophobia—in the old and new left. Like a good '60s radical, I went to see why that car was there. There might have been 20 people around—this was 10:30 at night.

On the third night of the rebellion, Fouratt co-founded the Gay Liberation Front, the first of many lesbian and gay liberation movements that sprouted across the country in the following months.

Fouratt was a founding member of the Lesbian and Gay Community Service Center, the Gay Community Service Center, and Wipe Out AIDS (now known as H.E.A.L). He was active in ACT UP, serving on the media committee with Michael Signorile and Jay Blotcher.

In 2009, Fouratt took part in the Democratic primary against City Council Speaker Christine Quinn. He claims to have raised $20,000 in two weeks, but later withdrew. In 2016, Fouratt ran for State Assembly but lost to Deborah Glick. He is a member of the Village Independent Democrats club.

== Other work ==
=== Music and nightlife ===
In 1969 Fouratt worked as an assistant to Clive Davis.

In 1978, Fourrat became the manager for the club Hurrah where he brought in DJs to create the first "rock disco," with music videos playing as well as live music acts. He also worked at Pop Front, and Studio 54.

In 1980, he opened the nightclub Danceteria with Rudolf Pieper. In November 1980, Pieper and Fouratt had prepared to open the New Peppermint Lounge night club, but were pushed out by Frank Roccio and Tom Goodkind. In June 1982, Pieper and Fouratt became embroiled in a legal battle, and Fouratt was pushed out.

In the early 1990s, Fouratt served as director of national publicity at Rhino Records, and from 1995 to 1999, Fouratt was the vice president of A&R at Mercury Records. In the late 1990s, Fouratt attempted to launch the sub-imprint Beauty Records, but that project ended when PolyGram, Mercury's parent corporation, was bought by Seagram's, and Fouratt's acts were let go.

=== Journalism ===
Fouratt has been pop culture critic for Billboard and Rolling Stone and a contributing editor at Spin. Additionally, he has written for The Village Voice, The Advocate, Bay Area Reporter, Gay City News and Come Out!. He is currently an editor for Westview News.

=== Acting ===
Fouratt studied for seven years with Lee Strasberg in the early 1960s. Fouratt was a member of the Open Theater, and performed at Café Cino and La MaMa. He joined Actors Equity and made his Broadway debut in The Freaking Out of Stephanie Blake. He worked with the National Shakespeare Theatre in Cambridge.

== Personal life ==
In 1969, Fouratt asked his lover Peter Hujar to take a photograph for a Gay Liberation Front recruitment poster. The image is now one of the most iconic of the gay liberation movement.

Hujar's boyfriend at the time, Jim Fouratt, arrived on the scene to organize for the Gay Liberation Front (GLF), the first political group to cite homosexuality in its name. Hujar agreed to make a photograph for a GLF poster. The poster, portraying a jubilant group of GLF members under the slogan COME OUT!!, appeared in late spring 1970 in advance of the gay liberation march that marked the first anniversary of Stonewall.

Fouratt has faced criticism for his comments on transgender identities and transsexualism, which he views as a method "to make gay men and lesbians straight." He believes that transgender identity reinforces gender stereotypes and that trans discourse is marginalizing the experiences of gays and lesbians. However, in a 2015 Facebook post, he wrote "I support the right of each person to control their body. Period. Fighting the conscription of socially policed gender behavior is an essential fight."

In 2009, when asked by Stephen Colbert if there was a leader in the gay community on par with Martin Luther King Jr., Fouratt said "Well, I would like to think that I'm that leader."

Fouratt previously lived with Carl Miller, Allen Young, and Giles Kotcher in the Seventeenth Street commune.

== See also ==
- Timeline of LGBT history
- List of gay, lesbian or bisexual people
- List of LGBT rights activists
