= Anita Sarko =

American musician and journalist

Anita Sarko (c. 1947 – October 18, 2015) was an American DJ and music journalist. She grew up in Detroit, then attended the University of Arizona and graduated from the Michigan State University. She moved to New York City in 1979 and was the DJ in the VIP room at the legendary no wave Mudd Club where she was known for the extraordinarily eclectic array of music she played. In 1983, she began spinning at Danceteria. In 1985, she worked for Studio 54 founder Steve Rubell at the Palladium, becoming the musical mainstay of the Mike Todd room. Later, she became a journalist and wrote for Paper, Interview and Playboy. Sarko died by suicide at age 68.
