= Elan Portnoy =

- Genres: 1960s rock and roll
- Occupations: Producer, musician
- Instruments: Guitar, vocals
- Labels: Russian Winter Records, Screaming Apple Records

Elan Portnoy is an American record producer and a guitarist in three bands: The Headless Horsemen, The Fuzztones and The Waspmen.

== Music history ==
=== The Headless Horsemen ===
In the late 1980s, Portnoy was a guitarist for The Headless Horsemen, a New York City based 60s Rock-n-Roll group. The band reunited in 2013 and opened for Billy Gibbons'(ZZ Top) band The Moving Sidewalks at BB King Blues Club & Grill in New York City.

=== The Fuzztones ===
Between 1982 and 1985, Portnoy was the lead guitarist for The Fuzztones. This 1980s Garage/Psychedelic band was the first US band in the genre to tour Europe and the UK in 1985. The Fuzztones regularly appeared at The Peppermint Lounge, Irving Plaza, CBGB, and The Dive. They also appeared at The Elixir Festival in Brittany, France, in 1985 alongside The Clash and Midnight Oil.

The Fuzztones released over a dozen recordings on vinyl and CD in Europe and the US during this era, and they have played on bills with The Bangles, The Lords of the New Church, The Damned, The Cramps and R.E.M. They have also played on a special Christmas show with Screamin' Jay Hawkins which was released as an LP in the US.

=== Other appearances ===
Portnoy has played onstage with Screamin' Jay Hawkins, Lenny Kaye Patty Smith Group, Roy Loney of the Flamin' Groovies, Mark Lindsay of Paul Revere and The Raiders, Jimy Sohns of The Shadows of Knight, Tony Valentino of The Standells, Mitch Ryder Detroit Wheels and Hilton Valentine of The Animals. He has also recorded with The Shadows of Knight, Teisco Del Ray, Herrera and The Handouts, Lone Wolves, Savage Suns and The Roamin’ Numerals.

== Producing ==
Since 1984, Portnoy has produced dozens of records and CDs for bands in New York City such as his bands The Fuzztones and The Headless Horsemen, The Outta Place, The Primeval Unknown, The Bohemian Bedrocks, The Twisted, and The Lone Wolves. Portnoy is currently working with a new group, Screamin' Mikey and The MoKan Sharks.
