= Rockaway Records =

Music and memorabilia store in Los Angeles

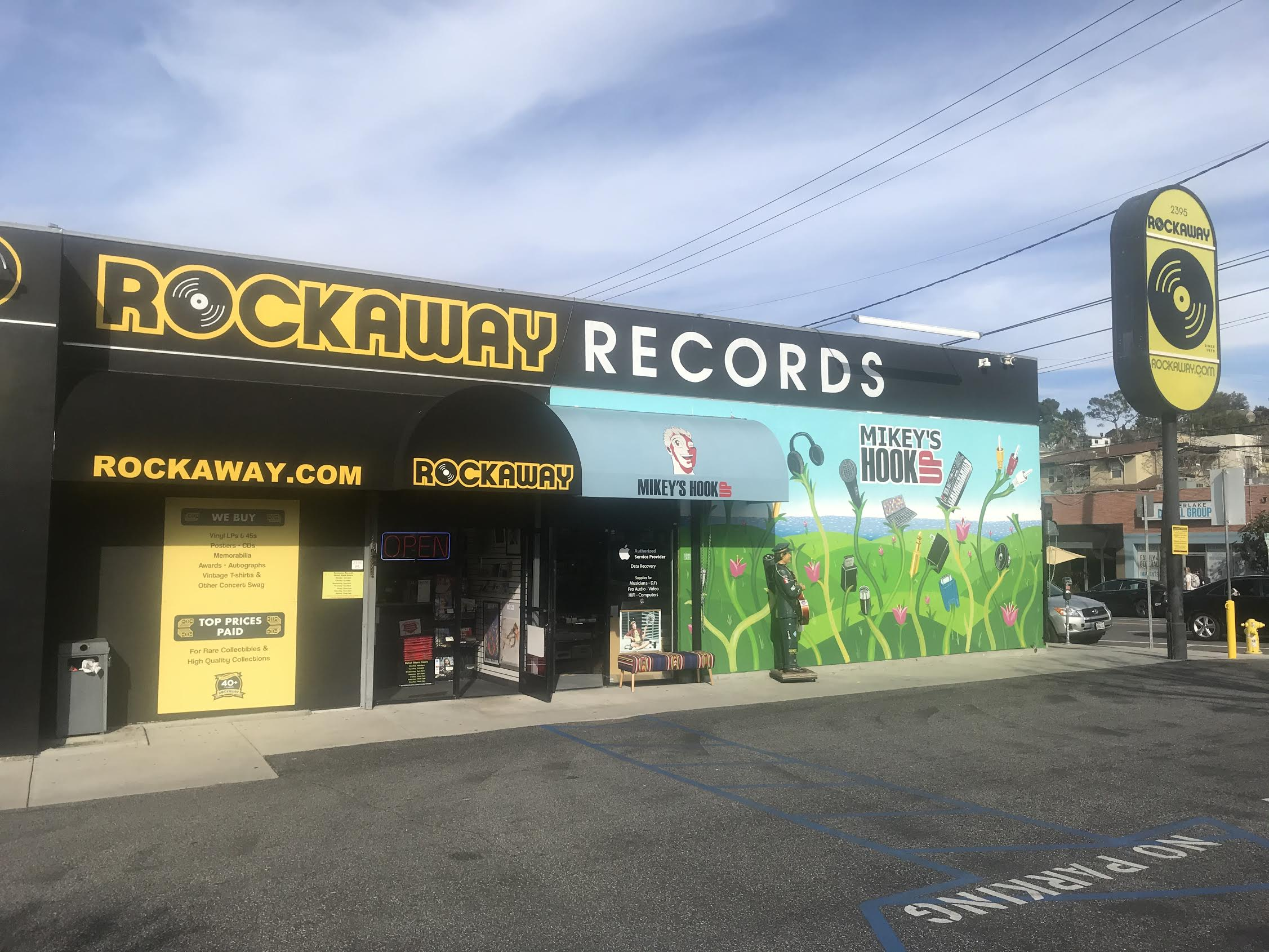
Exterior of Rockaway Records, March 2020

Rockaway Records is a US independent music and memorabilia store located in the Silver Lake neighborhood of Los Angeles, California. The store's specialties are rare vinyl records, autographs, posters, memorabilia, and other music collectibles. It was founded in 1979 in Los Angeles by brothers Gary and Wayne Johnson.

== History ==
In 1979, after attending a record swap meet in the Capitol Records parking lot in Hollywood, avid music lovers Gary and Wayne Johnson began buying and reselling vinyl albums. The pair started frequenting yard sales and swap meets looking for old records. Within a couple months of discovering the Capitol swap meet, they started selling there as well as buying more rarities. What started as a hobby soon became an international mail order business run out of the basement of the house they shared in Brea, California. The choice of business name was an homage to the Ramones song "Rockaway Beach".

Within a couple of years, the brothers quit their jobs to focus on Rockaway's full-time mail order business. In 1982 the Johnsons purchased Rainbow Records, a small record store on Glendale Boulevard in the Silver Lake neighborhood of Los Angeles. The brick-and-mortar Rockaway Records moved twice along the same street before moving into its current location in 1992. Upon purchasing the 9,000 square-foot property (previously home to a nightclub called Caché), Rockaway became the largest record store in Los Angeles.

After several years working alongside his brothers, Alan Johnson opened a second Rockaway Records location in Mesa, Arizona, which closed in 2007. In 1992, a sister store opened in Brisbane, Australia.

Lucinda Williams and Tommy Dunbar are among the former employees of Rockaway.

== Auctions and sales ==
Rockaway has a history of buying and selling large collections, as well as newsworthy and unique items.

- In 1991, the store made headlines for selling the first known copy of Prince's never-issued 1987 Black Album on CD for $13,500.
- In 2009, the store acquired the world's largest Led Zeppelin LP collection.
- In 2014, the store bought and sold a collection of Beatles memorabilia valued at more than half a million dollars.
- In 2015, Rockaway sold an original drawing by John Lennon and Paul McCartney from 1967 (replicated in the Monterey International Pop Music Festival program) for $175,000.

== In popular culture ==
- The store was used as a filming location for the TV series Arliss.
- The store was used as a filming location for the movie Border Radio.
- The store was used as a filming location for the reality TV series Gene Simmons Family Jewels.
- Erykah Badu's 2008 music video for "Honey" was filmed at Rockaway Records in Los Angeles.
