= Das Fürlines =

American punk band

- Also known as: Das Fürleins
- Origin: New York City
- Genres: Garage rock; punk rock; polka
- Years active: 1985–1990
- Past members: Wendy Wild; Holly George-Warren; Deb O'Nair; Liz Lüv; Rachel Amadeo

Das Fürlines (sometimes spelled Das Fürleins) were an all-female punk-polka band that emerged from New York's Lower East Side in the mid-1980s. Though the band released a few songs on underground polka and holiday music compilations, Das Fürlines did not release any records of their own, opting instead to publish a cookbook. The band's tribute to German culture and music extended to include many songs by 1960s proto-punk group The Monks.

== Band history ==
Das Fürlines was formed in New York City's East Village by vocalist Wendy Wild of Pulsallama, The Mad Violets and The Love Delegation, and keyboardist Deb O’Nair who played with The Fuzztones and Tina Peel. They were joined by bassist Liz Gall, Italian-born filmmaker Rachel Amadeo on drums and Rolling Stone editor Holly George-Warren added guitar, each adopting the stage names Liz Lüv, Rachel Schnitzel and Holly Hemlock to highlight the band’s Germanic aesthetics.

Das Fürlines gigged regularly with fellow New York garage rock band The Fleshtones and toured North America, spanning the continent as far as Vancouver, Miami, and Boston. While many of their shows were at small venues playing for a close-knit crowd, Das Fürlines occasionally opened for bigger-name acts like The Psychedelic Furs and Frank Zappa. In 1987 a clip of Das Furlines dancing to their polka tune "Nichts Nein Frankenstein" was featured on the short-lived MTV program Andy Warhol's Fifteen Minutes following a conversation in which Warhol states that he hates polka music and artist Kenny Scharf tells him to listen to Das Fürlines. That same year, People magazine ran an article on the band, highlighting their penchant for polka and use of performative irony.

Much of Das Fürlines' repertoire comprised faithful renditions of songs written and recorded by The Monks, a band formed in the early 1960s by five servicemen enlisted in the United States Army on a military base in Gelnhausen, Germany. After being discharged, The Monks had remained in West Germany where they released three singles and an album before disbanding and falling into obscurity for three decades. Das Fürlines inclusion of The Monks' catalog was the foundation of the band’s faux-German schtick, and Das Fürlines adopted The Monks' unusually overdriven guitar-bass-drums-organ-banjo lineup in order to replicate their sound. Das Fürlines went on to record The Monks song "We Do Wie Du" and reworked another song, "Oh, How To Do Now," as "O Tannenbaum Now" for a compilation of Christmas music. In performance, Das Fürlines' live set included as many as 10 cover versions of songs from The Monks' sole 1966 album, Black Monk Time, amending the lyrics to only two of the songs: The Monks' eponymous "Monk Time" become "Das Fürline Theme," and the subject matter of "That's My Girl" was reworked from a song about dating to one about art.

Apart from a three-song demo tape and individual tracks appearing on a handful of underground music compilations, Das Fürlines never released a record of their own, choosing instead to explore other media for their principal artistic output. One project was a cookbook containing profiles for each member of the band and recipes for the food and drink that they liked. Known for their extravagant costumes, Das Fürlines accompanied an April 1986 performance with an exhibition of headgear created by the band and made holiday-themed greeting cards that served as flyers for the show.

== Aftermath ==
In 1989 Das Fürlines vocalist Wendy Wild was diagnosed with breast cancer and the band played a benefit event for her medical expenses. Das Fürlines disbanded in 1990 with various members shifting focus to family and career projects. Wendy Wild died in 1996.

In 1992, the existence of Das Fürlines was brought to the attention of The Monks when Mike Stax and Keith Patterson of Ugly Things magazine tracked down each member of The Monks and showed them the People magazine article about Das Fürlines from five years earlier, which made mention of The Monks. Growing interest in The Monks' music from tributes played by Das Fürleins, fellow New York City band Fish and Roses, and Mark E. Smith of The Fall helped encourage The Monks to reunite in 1999.

== Members ==
- Wendy Wild/Vendy Vild – lead vocals, banjo, rhythm guitar
- Holly George-Warren/Holly Hemlock – lead guitar, vocals
- Deb "Krautheim" O'Nair/Deb-O-Nair– keyboards, vocals, accordion
- Liz Gall/Liz Lüv – bass guitar
- Rachel Amadeo/Rachel Schnitzel – drums

== Discography ==
=== Cassette ===
- Das Fürlines 3-song demo (self-released, 1985)

=== Compilation appearances ===
- “O Tannenbaum Now” on Oh! No! Not Another... Midnight Christmas Mess Again!! (Midnight Records, 1986)
- “We Do, Wie Du” on Crawling From Within (77 Records, 1987)
- “Nichts Nein Frankenstein” on Polka Comes To Your Haus! (Restless Records, 1990)
- ”Twister Punch Polka” on American Polka: Old Tunes & New Sounds (Trikont-Our Own Voice, 2001)
