= Wendy Wild =

American singer

- Born: Wendy Andreiv; August 31, 1956
- Died: October 26, 1996 (aged 40)
- Occupations: Singer, musician, artist

Wendy Wild (born Wendy Andreiev, August 31, 1956 – October 26, 1996) was an American singer, musician, and artist who in the 1980s was a well-known presence in New York's downtown music and performance scenes.

== Career ==
Growing up in Northport, New York, Wild moved to Manhattan in the late 1970s, accompanied by John McLoughlin, who would later become known as the performer John Sex. Throughout the 1980s she performed regularly in Lower Manhattan night clubs and art spaces, including the Lucky Strike, Privates, and Club 57. She would become a fixture at the Pyramid Club, where she could often be seen go-go dancing on the bar.

Along with her work as a nightclub performer, Wild performed in several New York-based bands, including the Roll-Ons, Pulsallama, the Problem Drinkers, the Wild Hyaenas (with then-boyfriend Keith Streng of The Fleshtones), polka-rockers Das Furlines, and most famously the neo-psychedelic Mad Violets. In addition to playing locally in many of Manhattan's rock venues (The Dive, Irving Plaza, CBGB, Danceteria, Andy Warhol's Underground, and others), she and her bands toured extensively, including US performance dates at Boston's The Rat, Miami's Club Nu, and the 9:30 Club in Washington, D.C. Overseas appearances included London (The Venue), Leeds and Manchester (The Haçienda), England with Pulsallama in 1982, and Tokyo in 1988 with John Sex.

During her career, Wild appeared on several recordings. Along with releases for Mad Violets (World of LSD... and the posthumously released Season of the Mad Violets), she sang on records for Bronski Beat, The Fleshtones, Peter Zaremba's Love Delegation, Hoodoo Gurus, and John Sex. She also appeared in two music videos with Mr. Sex, "Hustle with My Muscle" and "Rock Your Body", as well as the 1988 documentary Mondo New York.

Wild performed in the stage musicals The Sound of Muzak at Club 57 in 1981 (revived at NYC's Limelight in 1986), and Peter Pan at Danceteria in 1983. She also staged one-woman shows for her booze-addled sex-kitten character Joey Heatherock and was one of the group of East Village performers who created the first annual Wigstock festival. She performed at Wigstock many times and appeared in Wigstock, The Movie, released in 1994.

Many of Wild's performances at the Pyramid and other New York City venues have been recorded by the late video artist Nelson Sullivan and have been included in exhibitions of his work.

Wild died on October 26, 1996, from breast cancer.

== Selected recordings ==
- Pulsallama – Ungawa Part II/The Devil Lives in My Husband's Body (1981)
- Pulsallama – Oui Oui (A Canadian in Paris) (1983)
- Various Artists – Train To Disaster (1983)
- Richard Mazda – Hands of Fate (1983)
- Bronski Beat – Hundred And Thousands (1985)
- Mad Violets – World Of ... (1986)
- Peter Zaremba's Love Delegation – Spread The Word (1986)
- The Fleshtones – Fleshtones Vs. Reality (1987)
- Frieda – Disco Lover / Plastic Rap (1987)
- Various Artists – Time Bomb: Fleshtones Present The Big Bang Theory (1988)
- John Sex – Rock Your Body (1988)
- Peter Zaremba's Love Delegation – Delegation Time (1989)
- Various Artists – Polka Comes to Your Haus! (1990)
- Various Artists – Battle of the Garages, Vol. 1 (1994)
- Hoodoo Gurus – The Mountain (1994)
- Mad Violets – Season of the Mad Violets (2004)

(Wild also sang the title theme to the 1989 film No Such Thing as Gravity)
