= The Fuzztones =

American garage rock revival band

- The Fuzztones, original New York City line-up from the 1980s

Background information
- Origin: New York City
- Genres: Garage rock revival, psychedelic rock
- Years active: 1980–present
- Labels: Cleopatra; Midnight; Music Maniac; Get Back; Situation Two
- Members: Rudi Protrudi; Lana Loveland; Marco Rivagli; Marcello Salis; Pablo Rodas; Nico Secondini
- Past members: Deb O'Nair; Ira Elliot; Michael Jay; Elan Portnoy; Jason Savall; John Carlucci; Jordan Tarlow; Mike Czekaj; Jake Cavaliere; Gabriel Hammond; Philip Arriagada; Mark Lane; Fez Wrecker; Andrea Kusten; Lenny Svilar; Rob Louwers; Oliver Pilsner; David Thorpe
- Website: thefuzztones.net

The Fuzztones are an American garage rock revival band formed in 1980.

== History ==
Founded by singer-guitarist Rudi Protrudi in New York City, the band has gone through several member changes but is currently active in Europe. Since the 1980s they maintained a strong fan base in New York, in Europe (with their music being played on Hungarian State Radio), and in Los Angeles.

Rudi Protrudi moved to Los Angeles in 1987, after the breakup of the original band, to organize a new Fuzztones, consisting of Jordan Tarlow (lead guitar), John "Speediejohn" Carlucci (bass guitar), Jason Savall (Vox combo organ), and "Mad" Mike Czekaj (drums). This the band has resided since 2005. The Fuzztones bear the distinction of being the only 1980's garage rock revival band to secure a major label record deal, when they signed to RCA in 1990.

The group's name is derived from Fuzz Tone, the commercial name of a guitar effect pedal invented in 1962 and whose distinctive sound was popularized in the 1965 hit song "(I Can't Get No) Satisfaction" by the Rolling Stones.

== Members ==
=== Current members ===
- Rudi Protrudi – lead vocals, guitar, harmonica
- Marcello Salis – guitar, backing vocals
- Pablo Rodas – bass
- Nico Secondini – organ, backing vocals
- Marco Rivagli – drums, backing vocals

Lana Loveland – organ, backing vocals

=== Founder members ===
- Rudi Protrudi – vocals, guitar
- Deb O'Nair – organ
- Elan Portnoy – guitar
- Michael Jay – bass
- Michael Phillips – drums
- Randy Pratt - bass

== Discography ==
=== Studio albums ===
- Lysergic Emanations (1985) #12 UK Indie
- In Heat (1989)
- Braindrops (1991)
- Monster A-Go-Go (1992)
- Salt for Zombies (2003)
- Horny as Hell (2008)
- Preaching to the Perverted (2011)
- NYC (2020)
- Encore (2022)

=== Live albums ===
- Screamin' Jay Hawkins and the Fuzztones Live 12-inch EP (1984, United States Midnight Records MIRLP114B)
  - reissued in 2006 on 12-inch EP by Italy Get Back Records
  - reissued in 2015 on 12-inch LP by Cleopatra record USA (original four tracks on A side and bonus tracks on B side), also available on cd (same running time and track list)
- Leave Your Mind at Home (12-inch EP, 1984, United States Midnight Records - MIRLP105)
  - reissued in 2006 on 12-inch EP by Italy Get Back Records
- Lysergic Love/Lovely Sort of Death (1986, Furlined Vulcano/Purple Helmut) (bootleg live album)
- Live in Europe! flexidisc (1987, Germany Music Maniac Records MM06)
  - reissued in 2006 on 12-inch LP with gatefold sleeve by Italy Get Back Records
    - First 1,000 copies contain one-sided 7-inch picture disc of the Glora flexidisc
- Blues Themes/13 Women And The Only Man Around (1988, Mint Minus Records MMR666) live bootleg
  - Blues Theme (1987) - German bootleg of above
- In Heat Tour souvenir 10-inch picture disc (1989, United Kingdom Situation Two Records SIT 61)
- Lysergic Ejaculations CD (1994, Germany Music Maniac Records MM052)
- LSD 25: 25 Years of Fuzz and Fury CD & DVD (2005, Sin 002 / Italy Get Back Records GET138)
- Lord Have Mercy On My Soul (Recorded at Lincoln Lounge, Venice, CA. - 7-inch single, 2005, Twist, Twist 34)
- Live at the Dive '85 12-inch LP, CD (2023, Italy Area Pirata Records)

=== Compilation albums ===
- Creatures that Time Forgot (LP/CD,1989, Germany, Music Maniac - MMLP020/United States Skycad CD/LP HEAD 64CD/HEAD 64)
- Teen Trash Vol. 4 12-inch LP/CD (1993, Germany Music Maniac MM88004)
- Flashbacks (1996, Sundazed Music SC11045)
- Lysergic Legacy – The Very Best Of (2013, Cleopatra Records)
- Friends and Fiends (2024, Cleopatra Records)
- Buried Treasure (2025, Cleopatra Records)
- The Fuzztones vs The World - Music from the Soundtrack of the Motion Picture (2025, Radiation Records)

=== Singles and EPs ===
Title	Side A	Side B	Notes
Bad News Travels Fast	Bad News Travels Fast	Brand New Man (And A Brand New Car)	7-inch single,1984, United States, Midnight, MID4504 - 12-inch EP reissued in 1986 in United Kingdom by ABC, ABCS 011T and in 2006 by Spain Munster, REF.7199 Charts: #20 UK Indie
She's Wicked	She's Wicked	Epitaph For A Head	7-inch / 12-inch EP, 1986, United Kingdom - ABC Records - ABCS 006/ABCS 006T Charts: #5 UK Indie
1-2-5	1-2-5	Just A Dream Away (The Wipers)	7" split album,1986 - Enigma Europe - CARA 1D 223
Gloria	Gloria		flexidisc,1987, Germany Music Maniac, free with first 5,000 copies of Live in Europe!, Rat Scabies and Doctor and the Medics appear on the song "Gloria"
Nine Months Later	1. Nine Months Later (Written-By – Rudi Protrudi 4:56); 2. Girl, You Captivate Me (Written-By – R. Martinez* 2:21)	1. Cheyenne Rider (Written-By – J. Tarlow, M. Czekaj 3:06); 2. The Greatest Lover In The World (Written-By – E. McDaniels* 2:30)	12-inch EP, 1988, Germany, Music Maniac MM013) reissued in UK in 1989 on 12-inch EP and 7-inch single by UK Situation Two - SIT 61T - Reissued in UK in 1989 on 12-inch EP and 7-inch single by UK Situation Two - SIT 61T
Nine Months Later	Nine Months Later	1. You Must Be A Witch; 2. Down on the Street (feat. Ian Astbury - 12-inch EP only)	1989 - 12-inch EP and 7-inch single by UK Situation Two - SIT 61T Charts: #20 UK Indie
Hurt on Hold	Hurt on Hold	1. Jack the Ripper; 2. I Can't Control Myself (12-inch EP only)	7-inch single / 12-inch EP, 1989, UK, Situation Two, SIT 58 T
Action	1. Action Speaks Louder Than Words - 2:15; 2. I Never Knew - 3:18	1. Yeah Babe - 3:21; 2. My Nothing - 2:02	12-inch EP / CD, 1990, UK, Situation Two, SIT 69 T
Romilar D	1. Romilar D (Alternate Version) - 3:58; 2. Rise - 3:49	1. Romilar D (Espanol); 2. Romilar D (Italiano)	12-inch EP - 1992, UK, Music Maniac, MM 12004
Face Of Time/My Brother The Man	Face Of Time - 3:05	My Brother The Man - 2:13	7-inch single, US, 1994, RAFR
The People In Me/I'm Gonna Make You Mine	The People In Me	I'm Gonna Make You Mine	1998, Misty Lane - FREE with issue #16
One Girl Man	One Girl Man	1. You Must Be a Witch - 2:41; 2. I'm Gonna Make You Mine - 2:29	7-inch single, 1998, USA, Sundazed Music, SEP 139
Help, Murder, Police	Help, Murder, Police - 2:01	1. Out Of Our Tree - 3:29; 2. Brand New Man (Brand New Version) - 2:37	7-inch single, 2001, Italy, Teen Sound TEENS-021-A
Idol Chatter/A Wristwatch Band	Idol Chatter	A Wristwatch Band	7-inch single, 2002, Italy, Beard of Stars BOSS32
Hallucination Generation	Hallucination Generation		7-inch single, 2002, Mexico, Darkzone, DZ01
Lord Have Mercy On My Soul	Lord Have Mercy On My Soul (Black Oak Arkansas)	They're Gonna Take You Away (Rudi Protrudi)	7-inch single, 2005, UK, Twist Records, TWIST34
Strychnine	Strychnine	She's Wicked	7-inch single, 2020, UK, Easy Action, EA45038
Born to Be Wild	Born to Be Wild (feat. Ann-Margret)	Born to Be Wild (instrumental)	7-inch single, 2022, US, Cleopatra Records, CLO2951SP-SPLAT

=== Tributes and other appearances ===
- Illegitimate Spawn double CD (Tribute album to The Fuzztones featuring 42 bands - 2006, Sin Records SIN003)
- Songs We Taught The Fuzztones 2×CD (Original versions of songs played by the Fuzztones - 1989, Germany Music Maniac MMCD 66002)
- The Fuzztones Boom 10-inch EP / CD (The Sonics tribute album - 2006, Beyond Your Mind Records)
1. A1 - Caught You Red-Handed
2. A2 - Cinderella
3. A3 - The Witch
4. B1 - Have Love Will Travel
5. B2 - Strychnine
6. B3 - Boss Hoss
- Born to Be Wild (Ann-Margret album, featured on the title track- 2023, Cleopatra Records)

=== Compilation appearances ===
- The Rebel Kind (1983, Sounds Interesting Records)
  - includes the song "Ward 81"
- New York Freakout flexidisc (1984, 99th Floor fanzine & Venus Records)
  - includes the song "99th Floor", also tracks by Plasticland and The Vipers
- Battle of the Garages Vol.2 (Voxx Records/BOMP Records 200-019)
  - includes the song "Green Slime"
- Hanging Out at Midnight (1984, United States Midnight Records MIDLP 127)
  - includes the song "The Witch"
- Garage Sale cassette (1985, United States ROIR CASSETTE A135)
  - includes the song "Cinderella"
- Skullfuck 7-inch EP (1987, Germany Glitterhouse Records GR 0027)
  - Free with Glitterhouse magazine
  - includes a live recording of the song "Brand New Man"
  - also tracks by Broken Jug, The Fluid, and The Politicians
- Lost Trails 7-inch EP (included with Lost Trails fanzine)
- Gimmick double 12-inch LP (Germany Music Maniac MMLP 023)
- For Your Longhair Party 7-inch EP (1992, Aishna Ash Records 202)
  - includes the song "Be a Caveman"
- Cavestomp! Volume 1 CD (1998, Cavestomp Records 001)
  - includes the song "She's Wicked"
- R.A.F.R. Volume 3 CD (2000, R.A.F.R. Records RAFR011)
- Las Vegas Shakedown CD (2000, Masked Superstar Recordings 001)
  - includes the song "A Wristwatch Band"
- Be a Caveman: The Best of the Voxx Garage Revival CD (2004, Voxx Records VCD2073)
- Todos Somos Ramones CD (2004, Rockaway Records)
- Evil Fuzz (2005, Om Om Music RBKB9 B9)
- Lost in Tyme CD (included with 2005 issue of Lost in Tyme magazine)
  - includes the song "They're Gonna Take You Away"
- Children of Nuggets four-CD box set (2005, Rhino Records RT74639)
  - includes the song "Bad News Travels Fast"
- Psychedelica Volume I double CD (2006, Northern Star Records NS1)
- Halloween Garage Rock (2009, Garage Masters Records)
  - includes the song "She's Wicked"
- Psych-Out Christmas (2013, Cleopatra Records)
  - includes the song "Santa Claus"
- Summer Bash 2019 (2019, Soundflat Records)
  - includes "Alexander" (previously unreleased version), "Land of Nod" (feat. Steve Mackay), "This Game Called Girl" and "Invisible".
