= Club 57 (nightclub) =

Former nightclub in New York City

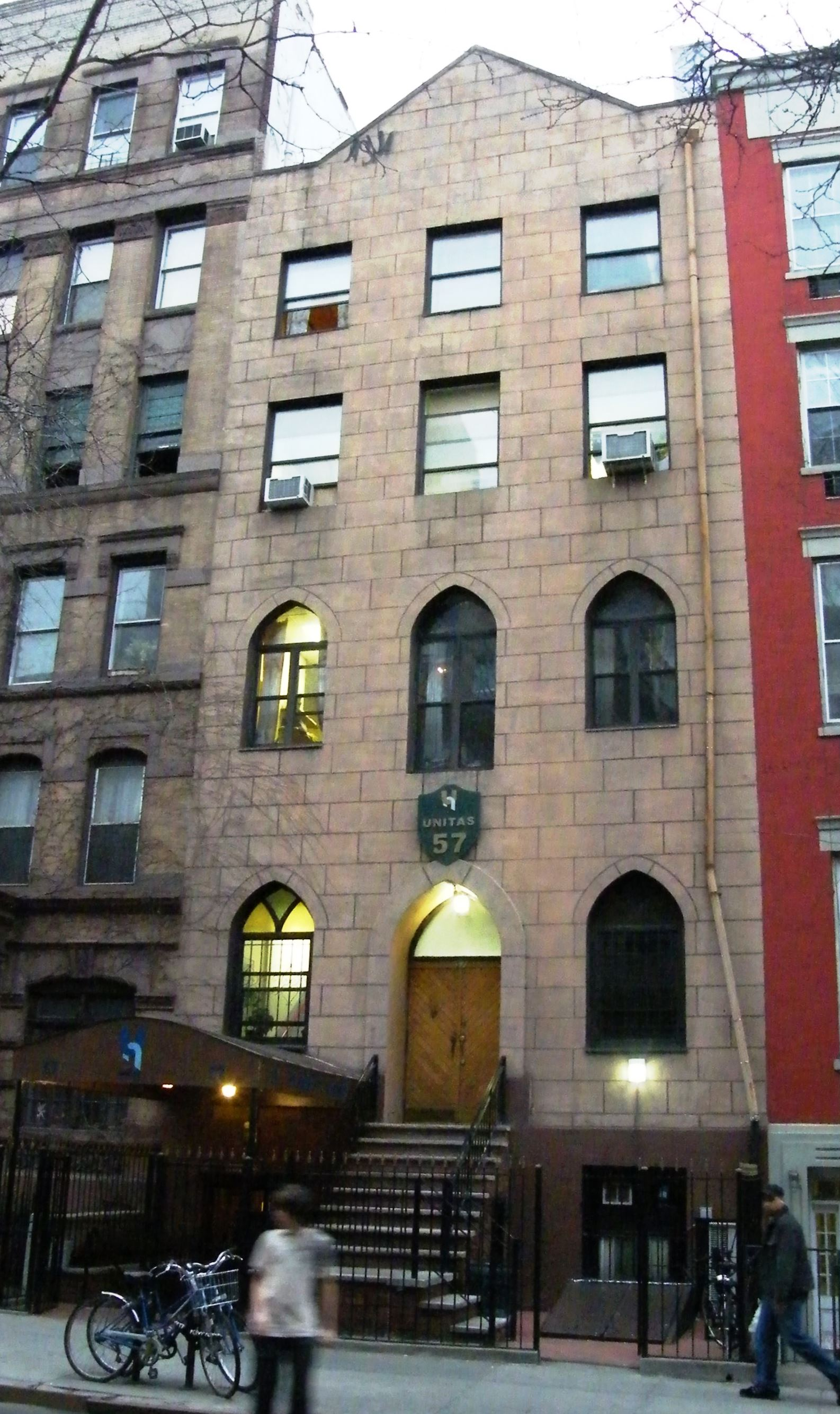
- In 2009
- Interactive map of Club 57
- Address: 57 St. Mark's Place
- Location: Manhattan, New York City
- Coordinates: 40.728316°N 73.986354°W
- Type: Nightclub

Construction
- Closed: around 1983

Club 57 was a nightclub located at 57 St. Mark's Place in the East Village, New York City during the late 1970s and early 1980s. It was originally founded by Stanley Zbigniew Strychacki as well as Dominic Rose, then enhanced by nightclub performer Ann Magnuson, Susan Hannaford, and poet Tom Scully. It was a hangout and venue for performance and visual artists and musicians, including The Cramps, Madonna, Keith Haring, Cyndi Lauper, Charles Busch, Klaus Nomi, The B-52s, RuPaul, Futura 2000, Tron von Hollywood, Kenny Scharf, Frank Holliday, John Sex, Wendy Wild, The Fall, April Palmieri, Peter Kwaloff (Sun PK), Robert Carrithers, The Fleshtones, The Fuzztones, Joey Arias, Lypsinka, Michael Musto, Marc Shaiman, Scott Wittman, Fab Five Freddy, Jacek Tylicki, and to a lesser extent, Jean-Michel Basquiat.

== Creation ==
It was started in the basement of the Holy Cross Polish National Church on St. Mark's. Ann Magnuson, who managed the club and hosted events, described it as home to:

"...pointy-toed hipsters, girls in rockabilly petticoats, spandex pants, and thrift-store stiletto heels... suburban refugees who had run away from home to find a new family ... who liked the things we liked — Devo, Duchamp, and William S. Burroughs — and (more important) hated the things we hated — disco, Diane von Fürstenberg, and The Waltons."

Magnuson describes a "Punk Do-It-Yourself aesthetic" which inspired events such as:

- A theatrical remake of "The Bad Seed" by Andy Rees
- Erotic Day-Glo art shows
- Theme parties (or "enviroteques")
- Putt-Putt Reggae Night (miniature golf played on a course made of refrigerator boxes designed to resemble a Jamaican shantytown)
- Model World of Glue Night (New York's hippest built airplane and monster models, burned them, and sniffed the epoxy)

== People involved ==
Dany Johnson was the resident DJ of the club. Guest DJs included Johnny Dynell and Afrika Bambaataa.

Tom Scully and Susan Hannaford ran a Monster Movie club on Tuesday nights. Drew Staub remembers that at 9:00 pm on Tuesdays, “They’d show the really worst monster movie that they could find. And everybody would scream and drink and carry on. I was the house critic of the movie.... I was known for that, and it used to gain me free admission.” (Hannaford relocated to Berlin and opened the Berlin Tea Room in August 2006.)

Keith Haring used to perform from inside a fake television set, and read his "neo-dada poems" at the Club 57 Wednesday night poetry readings, and later put on evenings and exhibitions there. He curated the "Black Light Show" there, an early show of his own works (1981), and an exhibition of Kenny Scharf's hand-customized appliances.

Artist Scott Covert cofounded Playhouse 57 with Andy Rees at Club 57.

Besides Magnuson's input, the main contribution to the Club 57 style was from School of Visual Arts undergraduate students (including Haring, Holliday, Scharf, and Sex), who used it as a playground. “At Club 57 there were drugs and promiscuity — it was one big orgy family. Sometimes I’d look around and say, 'Oh, my God! I’ve had sex with everybody in this room!' It was just the spirit of the times — and it was before AIDS," remembers Scharf. "Everybody there was either living together or sleeping together." Drew Staub agreed. Scharf recalls that "Ann Magnuson may have been twenty-four, but she was like our mom." Jean-Michel Basquiat fell out with Kenny Scharf, in part over Club 57: "esthetically I really hated Club 57. I thought it was silly. All this old and bad shit. I’d rather see something old and good.”

Other contributors included Shawn McQuate the Great aka AMMO, dancer, performance-artist and designer. Stacey Elkin and Shawn were known as the fashion designers of the club, and made costumes for many of the Club 57 performers, like Magnuson, Scharf, and model and artist Kitty Brophy. McQuate the Great/Shawn AMMO was John Sex's boyfriend for two years during the early club days. McQuate did several happenings, including having 50 performance artists performing at the same time, in Universal Interaction 1981. Also, Ande Whyland, Robert Carrithers, Minn Thometz-Sanchez and so many others played a vital role in the club's aesthetic.

== Later years, closure and legacy ==
Ann Magnuson left her position as manager of Club 57 soon after forming the band Pulsallama, and just before being cast in The Hunger with David Bowie." Andy Rees took over, bringing Marc Shaiman and Scott Wittman.

In 1981 Steve Mass of the Mudd Club began showing up at Club 57, and began hiring members of the Club 57 crowd to help acquire part of that scene. Haring was later hired to curate shows at the Mudd Club.

Club 57 closed in the early 1980s – "around 1983", according to Magnuson – after the community of artists moved on to larger and more expensive venues.

Since Club 57’s closure, the building that once housed has become a voluntary not-for-profit behavioral health and primary care clinic.

The club was the subject of Club 57: Film, Performance, and Art in the East Village, 1978–1983, an exhibition held at the Museum of Modern Art in 2017.
