= Danceteria =

Defunct New York City nightclub

Coordinates: 40.740883°N 73.992350°W

Danceteria was a nightclub that operated in New York City from May 1980 until 1986 and in the Hamptons until 1995. The club operated in various locations over the years, a total of three in New York City and four in the Hamptons. The most famous location was the second, a four-floor venue at 30 West 21st Street in Manhattan that served as the location for the disco scene in the film Desperately Seeking Susan.

== History ==
The first Danceteria was opened at 252 West 37th Street by German expatriate Rudolf Piper and talent booker Jim Fouratt. It catered to a diverse after-hours crowd coming from the downtown rock clubs Mudd Club, Trax, Tier 3, Chinese Chance, CBGB, and gay discos. The club's DJs were Mark Kamins, Bill Bahlman and Sean Cassette. The Video Lounge was designed by video artists John Sanborn and Kit Fitzgerald, who programmed an eclectic mix of found footage, video art, early music videos, and musical performances.

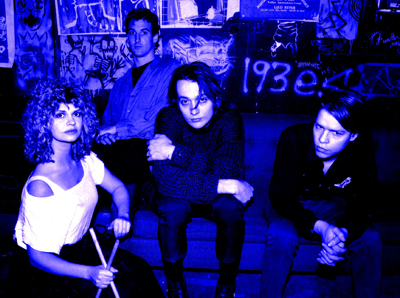
Post-punk band Certain General backstage at Danceteria in 1983

In October 1980, the New York liquor licensing authorities raided Danceteria, and 35 employees were arrested for selling liquor without a license. Less than a month later, the club was shut down again for liquor code violations.

In 1982, John Argento hired Fouratt and Piper to promote and book the talent for what became the 21st Street Danceteria. The club operated out of the first three floors in an old industrial 10-story building. (Later the 4th floor was used as Congo Bill, and the abandoned fifth floor was once used as a performance space by Karen Finley.) The roof was also open in the warmer months as Wuthering Heights, bar and barbecue.

The club opened to massive crowds and critical acclaim.

Three months after opening, Argento and Piper dismissed Fouratt and hired Ruth Polsky as the club's talent booker. Under Polsky's direction, the club became renowned as one of the centers of new wave music in New York and was frequented by many musicians and artists who became famous during the decade, such as Madonna, Nina Hagen, New Order, Duran Duran, Billy Idol, Sade, Wham!, R.E.M., the Smiths, Squeeze, Cyndi Lauper, Jean-Michel Basquiat, Keith Haring, Run-DMC, Depeche Mode, Butthole Surfers, The Fall, the B-52's, Samhain, Bauhaus, RuPaul, Phoebe Legere, Berlin, Units, Romeo Void, Sonic Youth, Swans, Stephen Merritt, Nick Cave and the Bad Seeds, the Cult, Karen Finley, Violent Femmes, Soft Cell, the Jesus and Mary Chain, Gene Loves Jezebel, Beastie Boys, LL Cool J, and Rob Zombie.

Haoui Montaug worked as a doorman at Danceteria.

In 1984, Argento and Piper opened a successful Hamptons outpost of Danceteria in Water Mill, New York. This was the first trendy NYC-style nightclub to open in the Hamptons.

The third Danceteria operated from May 1991 to 1993 in a run-down midtown space, the Martha Washington Hotel at 30 East 30th Street, where it was reportedly the site of frequent illegal drug use.

In 2008, the 21st Street location was sold, to be converted to luxury condominiums. The plan was abandoned by the end of the year.

In 2023, Rafe Gomez launched Danceteria REWIND, a weekly two-hour livestream mix show on Twitch. Danceteria REWIND's stated purpose was to re-create the multi-genre soundtrack that defined the Danceteria experience. It has consistently been Twitch's most globally viewed stream in the Music category, and is among Twitch's most viewed and followed weekly two-hour DJ mix streams it its timeslot. In November 2026, Gomez was enlisted to curate music for "New York Superstars", an art exhibit at Casa Cavazzini in Udine, Italy. The show features works by artists whose visions were influenced and shaped by the music at the Danceteria nightclub.

In July 2026, Madonna released the track "Danceteria" from her fifteenth studio album Confessions II. In the song, Madonna mentions people from the 1980s New York City downtown scene, including Martin Burgoyne, doorman Haoui Montaug, Debi Mazar, Maripol, Fab Five Freddy, Jean-Michel Basquiat, Keith Haring, David Byrne, Nile Rodgers, Kenny Scharf, Tony Shafrazi, the B-52s and Rock Steady Crew, concluding: "Everyone here is a work of art". That September, English synth-pop duo Soft Cell released Danceteria, their final album, its title track talks about the club and mentions Madonna.
