= November 10 =

November 10 this year in various calendars
- Tuesday, 10 November 2026
| Akan | Kurubene |
| Armenian | 23 Trē 1476 |
| Aztec | Atlcahualo 19, 6 Malīnalli |
| Babylonian | 28 Tashritu, 2337 SE |
| Balinese pawukon | Menga, Pasah, Laba, Umanis, Paniron, Anggara of Landep, Indra, Urungan, Dewa |
| Bengali | 25 Kartik, BS 1433 |
| Chinese | Yang Earth Rat・Wings Mansion; Fire Horse Year, Month 10, Day 2 (Lidong, 12 days until Xiaoxue) |
| Common Era | 10 November 2026 CE |
| Coptic | 1 Hathor, AM 1743 |
| Egyptian | 28 Phamenoth, 2775 NE |
| Ethiopian | 1 H̱edār, 2019 Amätä Məhrät |
| French Republican | Décade II, Nonidi de Brumaire de l'Année 235 de la République |
| Gregorian | 10 November, AD 2026 |
| Hebrew | 30 Cheshvan, AM 5787 |
| Hindu | Viśākhā・Saubhāgya; Solar: 24 Kārtika, 1948 SE; Lunisolar: Pratipada, Śukla pakṣa of Kārtika, 2083 VE; Rāudra・5127 KY・1,872,889 |
| Icelandic | Þriðjudagur, 18 Gormánuður 2026 |
| Islamic | 29 Jumada al-awwal, AH 1448 (using tabular method) |
| ISO week date | 2026-W46-2 |
| Japanese | 2 Kannazuki, Reiwa 8 (Rittō, 12 days until Shōsetsu) |
| Julian | 28 October, AD 2026 (AM 7535) |
| Julian day | 2461355 |
| Korean | 2 Dwaejidal, 4359 DE |
| Maya | 13.0.14.1.12; 5 Ceh, 6 Eb |
| Roman | ante diem V Kalendas Novembres, MMDCCLXXIX AUC |
| Solar Hijri | 19 Aban, SH 1405 |
| Tibetan | 1 smin drug, me pho rta 2153 or 1772 or 1000 |

| << | November | | | | | >> |
| Su | Mo | Tu | We | Th | Fr | Sa |
| 1 | 2 | 3 | 4 | 5 | 6 | 7 |
| 8 | 9 | 10 | 11 | 12 | 13 | 14 |
| 15 | 16 | 17 | 18 | 19 | 20 | 21 |
| 22 | 23 | 24 | 25 | 26 | 27 | 28 |
| 29 | 30 |
2026

November 10 in recent years
2026 (Tuesday)
2025 (Monday)
2024 (Sunday)
2023 (Friday)
2022 (Thursday)
2021 (Wednesday)
2020 (Tuesday)
2019 (Sunday)
2018 (Saturday)
2017 (Friday)

November 10 is the 314th day of the year (315th in leap years) in the Gregorian calendar; 51 days remain until the end of the year.

== Events ==
=== Pre-1600 ===
- 474 – Emperor Leo II dies after a reign of ten months. He is succeeded by his father Zeno, who becomes sole ruler of the Byzantine Empire.
- 937 – Ten Kingdoms: Li Bian usurps the throne and deposes Emperor Yang Pu. The Wu State is replaced by Li (now called "Xu Zhigao"), who becomes the first ruler of Southern Tang.
- 1160 – The assassination of Maio of Bari, chancelor of the kingdom of Sicily, leads to a crisis and the arrest of king William I of Sicily.
- 1202 – Fourth Crusade: Despite letters from Pope Innocent III forbidding it and threatening excommunication, Catholic crusaders begin a siege of Zara (now Zadar, Croatia).
- 1293 – Raden Wijaya is crowned as the first monarch of Majapahit kingdom of Java, taking the throne name Kertarajasa Jayawardhana.
- 1444 – Battle of Varna: The crusading forces of King Władysław III of Poland (aka Ulaszlo I of Hungary and Władysław III of Varna) are defeated by the Turks under Sultan Murad II and Władysław is killed.
- 1599 – Åbo Bloodbath: Fourteen noblemen who opposed Duke Charles are decapitated in the Old Great Square of Turku (Swedish: Åbo) for their involvement in the War against Sigismund.

=== 1601–1900 ===
- 1659 – Chattrapati Shivaji Maharaj, Maratha King kills Afzal Khan, Adilshahi in the battle popularly known as Battle of Pratapgarh.
- 1674 – Third Anglo-Dutch War: As provided in the Treaty of Westminster, Netherlands cedes New Netherland to England.
- 1702 – English colonists under the command of James Moore besiege Spanish St. Augustine during Queen Anne's War.
- 1766 – The last colonial governor of New Jersey, William Franklin, signs the charter of Queen's College (later renamed Rutgers University).
- 1775 – The United States Marine Corps is founded at Tun Tavern in Philadelphia by Samuel Nicholas.
- 1793 – A Goddess of Reason is proclaimed by the French Convention at the suggestion of Pierre Gaspard Chaumette.
- 1821 – Cry of Independence by Rufina Alfaro at La Villa de Los Santos, Panama setting into motion a revolt which led to Panama's independence from Spain and to it immediately becoming part of Colombia.
- 1847 – The passenger ship Stephen Whitney is wrecked in thick fog off the southern coast of Ireland, killing 92 of the 110 on board. The disaster results in the construction of the Fastnet Rock lighthouse.
- 1865 – Major Henry Wirz, the superintendent of a prison camp in Andersonville, Georgia, is hanged, becoming one of only three American Civil War soldiers executed for war crimes.
- 1871 – Henry Morton Stanley locates missing explorer and missionary, David Livingstone in Ujiji, near Lake Tanganyika, famously greeting him with the words, "Dr. Livingstone, I presume?"
- 1898 – White supremacists seized power and massacred black Americans during the Wilmington massacre, the only instance of a municipal government being overthrown in United States history.

=== 1901–present ===
- 1910 – The date of Thomas A. Davis' opening of the San Diego Army and Navy Academy, although the official founding date is November 23, 1910.
- 1918 – The Western Union Cable Office in North Sydney, Nova Scotia, receives a top-secret coded message from Europe (that would be sent to Ottawa and Washington, D.C.) that said on November 11, 1918, all fighting would cease on land, sea and in the air.
- 1939 – Finnish author F. E. Sillanpää is awarded the Nobel Prize in Literature.
- 1940 – The 1940 Vrancea earthquake strikes Romania killing an estimated 1,000 and injuring approximately 4,000 more.
- 1942 – World War II: Germany invades Vichy France following French Admiral François Darlan's agreement to an armistice with the Allies in North Africa.
- 1944 – The ammunition ship USS Mount Hood explodes at Seeadler Harbour, Manus, Admiralty Islands, killing at least 432 and wounding 371.
- 1945 – Heavy fighting in Surabaya between Indonesian nationalists and returning colonialists after World War II, today celebrated as Heroes' Day (Hari Pahlawan).
- 1946 – A magnitude 6.9 earthquake in the Peruvian Andes mountains kills at least 1,400 people.
- 1951 – With the rollout of the North American Numbering Plan, direct-dial coast-to-coast telephone service begins in the United States.
- 1954 – U.S. President Dwight D. Eisenhower dedicates the USMC War Memorial (Iwo Jima memorial) in Arlington Ridge Park in Arlington County, Virginia.
- 1958 – The Hope Diamond is donated to the Smithsonian Institution by New York diamond merchant Harry Winston.
- 1967 – The Nauru Independence Act 1967 passed the Parliament of Australia, giving independence to the UN Trust Territory of Nauru with effect from 31 January 1968.
- 1969 – National Educational Television (the predecessor to the Public Broadcasting Service) in the United States debuts Sesame Street.
- 1970 – Vietnam War: Vietnamization: For the first time in five years, an entire week ends with no reports of American combat fatalities in Southeast Asia.
- 1970 – Luna 17: uncrewed space mission launched by the Soviet Union.
- 1971 – In Cambodia, Khmer Rouge forces attack the city of Phnom Penh and its airport, killing 44, wounding at least 30 and damaging nine aircraft.
- 1971 – A Merpati Nusantara Airlines Vickers Viscount crashes into the Indian Ocean near Padang, West Sumatra, Indonesia, killing all 69 people on board.
- 1972 – Southern Airways Flight 49 from Birmingham, Alabama is hijacked and, at one point, is threatened with crashing into the nuclear installation at the Oak Ridge National Laboratory. After two days, the plane lands in Havana, Cuba, where the hijackers are jailed by Fidel Castro.
- 1975 – The 729-foot-long freighter SS Edmund Fitzgerald sinks during a storm on Lake Superior, killing all 29 crew on board.
- 1975 – Treaty of Osimo between Yugoslavia and Italy
- 1975 – Israeli-Palestinian conflict: the United Nations General Assembly passes Resolution 3379, determining that Zionism is a form of racism.
- 1979 – A 106-car Canadian Pacific freight train carrying explosive and poisonous chemicals from Windsor, Ontario, Canada derails in Mississauga, Ontario.
- 1983 – Bill Gates introduces Windows 1.0.
- 1985 – A Dassault Falcon 50 and a Piper PA-28 Cherokee collide in mid-air over Fairview, New Jersey, killing six people and injuring eight.
- 1989 – Longtime Bulgarian leader Todor Zhivkov is removed from office and replaced by Petar Mladenov.
- 1989 – Germans begin to tear down the Berlin Wall.
- 1995 – In Nigeria, playwright and environmental activist Ken Saro-Wiwa, along with eight others from the Movement for the Survival of the Ogoni People (Mosop), are hanged by government forces.
- 1997 – WorldCom and MCI Communications announce a $37 billion merger (the largest merger in US history at the time).
- 1999 – World Anti-Doping Agency is formed in Lausanne.
- 2001 – The Taliban held city of Mazar-i-Sharif falls to the Northern Alliance under generals Abdul Rashid Dostum and Atta Muhammad Nur.
- 2002 – Veteran's Day Weekend Tornado Outbreak: A tornado outbreak stretching from Northern Ohio to the Gulf Coast, one of the largest outbreaks recorded in November.
- 2006 – Sri Lankan Tamil politician Nadarajah Raviraj is assassinated in Colombo.
- 2006 – The National Museum of the Marine Corps in Quantico, Virginia is opened and dedicated by U.S. President George W. Bush, who announces that Marine Corporal Jason Dunham will posthumously receive the Medal of Honor.
- 2008 – Over five months after landing on Mars, NASA declares the Phoenix mission concluded after communications with the lander were lost.
- 2009 – Ships of the South and North Korean navies skirmish off Daecheong Island in the Yellow Sea.
- 2019 – President of Bolivia Evo Morales and several of his government resign after 19 days of civil protests and a recommendation from the military.
- 2020 – Armenia and Azerbaijan sign a ceasefire agreement, ending the Second Nagorno-Karabakh War, and prompting protests in Armenia.

== Births ==
=== Pre-1600 ===
- 745 – Musa al-Kadhim the seventh Shia Imam (died 799)
- 1278 – Philip I, Prince of Taranto (died 1332)
- 1341 – Henry Percy, 1st Earl of Northumberland, English politician (died 1408)
- 1433 – Charles the Bold, Duke of Burgundy (died 1477)
- 1480 – Bridget of York, English nun (died 1517)
- 1483 – Martin Luther, German monk and priest, leader of the Protestant Reformation (died 1546)
- 1489 – Henry V, Duke of Brunswick-Lüneburg and Prince of Wolfenbüttel (died 1568)
- 1490 – John III, Duke of Cleves (died 1539)
- 1520 – Dorothea of Denmark, Electress Palatine, Princess of Denmark, Sweden and Norway (died 1580)
- 1547 – Gebhard Truchsess von Waldburg, Archbishop of Cologne (died 1601)
- 1565 – Robert Devereux, 2nd Earl of Essex, English general and politician, Lord Lieutenant of Ireland (died 1601)
- 1565 – Laurentius Paulinus Gothus, Swedish astronomer and theologian (died 1646)
- 1577 – Jacob Cats, Dutch poet, jurist, and politician (died 1660)
- 1584 – Catherine of Sweden, Countess Palatine of Kleeburg (died 1638)

=== 1601–1900 ===
- 1620 – Ninon de l'Enclos, French courtier and author (died 1705)
- 1668 – François Couperin, French organist and composer (died 1733)
- 1668 – Louis, Prince of Condé (died 1710)
- 1695 – John Bevis, English physician and astronomer (died 1771)
- 1697 – William Hogarth, English painter, illustrator, and critic (died 1764)
- 1710 – Adam Gottlob Moltke, Danish courtier, politician, and diplomat (died 1792)
- 1728 – Oliver Goldsmith, Irish-English author, poet, and playwright (died 1774)
- 1735 – Granville Sharp, English activist and scholar, co-founded the Sierra Leone Company (died 1813)
- 1755 – Franz Anton Ries, German violinist and educator (died 1846)
- 1759 – Friedrich Schiller, German poet and playwright (died 1805)
- 1764 – Andrés Manuel del Rio, Spanish-Mexican scientist and discoverer of vanadium (died 1849)
- 1779 – Anne-Marie Javouhey, French nun, founder of the Sisters of St Joseph of Cluny (died 1851)
- 1801 – Vladimir Dal, Russian lexicographer and author (died 1872)
- 1801 – Samuel Gridley Howe, American physician and activist (died 1876)
- 1810 – George Jennings, English plumber and engineer, invented the flush toilet (died 1882)
- 1826 – Jacob Hamburger, German rabbi and author (died 1911)
- 1834 – José Hernández, Argentinian journalist, poet, and politician (died 1886)
- 1836 – Andrés Avelino Cáceres, Peruvian general, President of Peru (died 1923)
- 1844 – Henry Eyster Jacobs, American educator and theologian (died 1932)
- 1845 – John Sparrow David Thompson, Canadian lawyer, judge, and politician, 4th Prime Minister of Canada (died 1894)
- 1848 – Surendranath Banerjee, Indian academic and politician (died 1925)
- 1851 – Richard Armstedt, German philologist, historian, and educator (died 1931)
- 1858 – Heinrich XXVII, Prince Reuss Younger Line (died 1928)
- 1861 – Robert T. A. Innes, Scottish born astronomer (Proxima Centauri) (died 1933)
- 1861 – Amy Levy (died 1889) First Jewish student at Cambridge University
- 1868 – Gichin Funakoshi, Japanese martial artist and educator, founded Shotokan (died 1957)
- 1871 – Winston Churchill, American author and painter (died 1947)
- 1873 – Henri Rabaud, French conductor and composer (died 1949)
- 1874 – Idabelle Smith Firestone, American composer and songwriter (died 1954)
- 1878 – Cy Morgan, American baseball player (died 1962)
- 1879 – Vachel Lindsay, American poet and educator (died 1931)
- 1879 – Patrick Pearse, Irish lawyer, poet, teacher, and insurrectionist; executed for his role in the Easter Rising (died 1916)
- 1880 – Jacob Epstein, American-English sculptor (died 1959)
- 1884 – Zofia Nałkowska, Polish author and playwright (died 1954)
- 1886 – Edward Joseph Collins, American pianist, composer, and conductor (died 1951)
- 1887 – Elisa Leonida Zamfirescu, Romanian engineer and academic (died 1973)
- 1887 – Arnold Zweig, German author and activist (died 1968)
- 1888 – Andrei Tupolev, Russian engineer and designer, founded the Tupolev Design Bureau (died 1972)
- 1889 – Claude Rains, English-American actor (died 1967)
- 1890 – Carl Borgward, German engineer, founder of Borgward Group
- 1891 – Carl Stalling, American pianist and composer (died 1972)
- 1893 – John P. Marquand, American author (died 1960)
- 1894 – Boris Furlan, Slovenian lawyer, jurist, and politician (died 1957)
- 1895 – József Mátyás Baló, Hungarian physician and academic (died 1979)
- 1895 – Jack Northrop, American businessman, founded the Northrop Corporation (died 1981)
- 1896 – Jimmy Dykes, American baseball player and manager (died 1976)
- 1899 – Kate Seredy, Hungarian-American author and illustrator (died 1975)

=== 1901–present ===
- 1906 – Josef Kramer, German SS officer and convicted war criminal (died 1945)
- 1907 – Jane Froman, American actress and singer (died 1980)
- 1907 – John Moore, English activist and author (died 1967)
- 1908 – Noemí Gerstein, Argentinian sculptor and illustrator (died 1996)
- 1908 – Charles Merritt, Canadian colonel and politician, Victoria Cross recipient (died 2000)
- 1909 – Paweł Jasienica, Russian-Polish soldier, journalist, and historian (died 1970)
- 1909 – Johnny Marks, American composer and songwriter (died 1985)
- 1910 – Angelo Frattini, Italian sculptor (died 1975)
- 1912 – Birdie Tebbetts, American baseball player and manager (died 1999)
- 1913 – Karl Shapiro, American poet and academic (died 2000)
- 1916 – Louis le Brocquy, Irish painter and illustrator (died 2012)
- 1916 – Billy May, American trumpet player and composer (died 2004)
- 1918 – Ernst Otto Fischer, German chemist and academic, Nobel Prize laureate (died 2007)
- 1919 – George Fenneman, American radio and television announcer (died 1997)
- 1919 – Mikhail Kalashnikov, Russian general and engineer, designed the AK-47 (died 2013)
- 1919 – Michael Strank, American sergeant and flag raiser at the Battle of Iwo Jima (died 1945)
- 1919 – Moise Tshombe, Congolese accountant and politician, Prime Minister of the Democratic Republic of the Congo (died 1969)
- 1920 – Ina Clough, English actress (died 2003)
- 1920 – Rafael del Pino, Spanish businessman, founded the Ferrovial Company (died 2008)
- 1923 – Hachikō, Japanese dog famous for his loyalty to his owner (died 1935)
- 1924 – Bobby Limb, Australian comedian, actor, and bandleader (died 1999)
- 1925 – Richard Burton, Welsh actor and singer (died 1984)
- 1927 – Richard Connolly, Australian hymnodist (died 2022)
- 1927 – Vedat Dalokay, Turkish architect and a former mayor of Ankara (died 1991)
- 1927 – Vaughn O. Lang, American general (died 2014)
- 1927 – Sohei Miyashita, Japanese politician, Japanese Minister of Defense (died 2013)
- 1927 – Sabah, Lebanese singer and actress (died 2014)
- 1927 – Pedro Bustos, Argentine basketball player (died 2024)
- 1928 – Ennio Morricone, Italian trumpet player, composer, and conductor (died 2020)
- 1929 – Marilyn Bergman, American composer and songwriter (died 2022)
- 1929 – W. E. B. Griffin, American soldier and author (died 2019)
- 1929 – Ninón Sevilla, Cuban-Mexican actress and dancer (died 2015)
- 1929 – Tommy Banks, English footballer (died 2024)
- 1930 – Gene Conley, American baseball and basketball player (died 2017)
- 1931 – Lilly Pulitzer, American fashion designer (died 2013)
- 1932 – Paul Bley, Canadian-American pianist and composer (died 2016)
- 1932 – Necmettin Hacıeminoğlu, Turkish linguist, author, and academic (died 1996)
- 1932 – Roy Scheider, American actor (died 2008)
- 1932 – Arthur K. Snyder, American lawyer and politician (died 2012)
- 1933 – Ronald Evans, American captain, engineer, and astronaut (died 1990)
- 1933 – Seymour Nurse, Barbadian cricketer (died 2019)
- 1933 – Bobby Rush, American country blues singer-songwriter
- 1934 – Lucien Bianchi, Italian-Belgian race car driver (died 1969)
- 1934 – Garry Runciman, 3rd Viscount Runciman of Doxford, English sociologist and academic (died 2020)
- 1934 – A. Thurairajah, Sri Lankan engineer and academic (died 1994)
- 1934 – Clio Maria Bittoni, Italian lawyer (died 2024)
- 1935 – Bernard Babior, American physician and biochemist (died 2004)
- 1935 – Igor Dmitriyevich Novikov, Russian astronomer, astrophysicist, and cosmologist
- 1935 – Denis Edozie, Nigerian Supreme Court judge (died 2018)
- 1937 – Albert Hall, American actor
- 1937 – Andrey Urnov, Russian diplomat (died 2025)
- 1938 – Robert Moreland, American college basketball coach (Texas Southern Tigers) (died 2024)
- 1939 – Anscar Chupungco, Filipino monk and theologian (died 2013)
- 1939 – Tommy Facenda, American rock & roll singer and guitarist (died 2022)
- 1939 – Russell Means, American activist, actor, and musician (died 2012)
- 1939 – Allan Moffat, Canadian-Australian race car driver (died 2025)
- 1940 – Richard Cotton, Australian geneticist and academic (died 2015)
- 1940 – Screaming Lord Sutch, English singer-songwriter and politician (died 1999)
- 1942 – Robert F. Engle, American economist and academic, Nobel Prize laureate
- 1942 – James Hood, American activist (died 2013)
- 1942 – Hans-Rudolf Merz, Swiss lawyer and politician, 92nd President of the Swiss Confederation
- 1943 – Saxby Chambliss, American lawyer and politician
- 1943 – Ross Warner, Australian rugby league player (died 2020)
- 1944 – Askar Akayev, Kyrgyzstani economist and politician, 1st President of Kyrgyzstan
- 1944 – Mark E. Neely, Jr., American historian, author, and academic
- 1944 – Silvestre Reyes, American sergeant and politician
- 1944 – Tim Rice, English lyricist and author
- 1944 – Fazalur Raheem Ashrafi, Pakistani Islamic scholar (died 2026)
- 1945 – Terence Davies, English actor, director, and screenwriter (died 2023)
- 1945 – Donna Fargo, American singer-songwriter and guitarist
- 1947 – Glen Buxton, American guitarist and songwriter (died 1997)
- 1947 – Bachir Gemayel, Lebanese President and commander (died 1982)
- 1947 – Greg Lake, English singer-songwriter, guitarist, and producer (died 2016)
- 1947 – Dave Loggins, American singer-songwriter and guitarist (died 2024)
- 1948 – Aaron Brown, American journalist and academic (died 2024)
- 1948 – Luciano Sušanj, Croatian Olympic runner and politician (died 2024)
- 1948 – Shigesato Itoi, Japanese video game designer and voice actor, created EarthBound
- 1948 – Steven Utley, American author and poet (died 2013)
- 1949 – Ann Reinking, American actress, dancer, and choreographer (died 2020)
- 1949 – Don Saleski, Canadian ice hockey player
- 1949 – Mustafa Denizli, Turkish footballer and manager
- 1950 – Debra Hill, American screenwriter and producer (died 2005)
- 1950 – Jack Scalia, American actor
- 1950 – Bram Tchaikovsky, English singer-songwriter and guitarist
- 1951 – John Williamson, American basketball player (died 1996)
- 1953 – Les Miles, American football player and coach
- 1954 – Kevin Spraggett, Canadian chess player
- 1954 – Bob Stanley, American baseball player and coach
- 1955 – Jack Clark, American baseball player, coach, and manager
- 1955 – Roland Emmerich, German director, producer, and screenwriter
- 1956 – Mohsen Badawi, Egyptian businessman and activist
- 1956 – Sinbad, American comedian and actor
- 1957 – Nigel Evans, Welsh politician, Shadow Secretary of State for Wales
- 1958 – Deborah Cameron, English linguist, anthropologist, and academic
- 1958 – Stephen Herek, American director and producer
- 1958 – Omar Minaya, American baseball player and manager
- 1958 – Massimo Morsello, Italian singer-songwriter and activist (died 2001)
- 1958 – Brooks Williams, American singer-songwriter and guitarist
- 1959 – Mackenzie Phillips, American actress
- 1959 – Michael Schröder, German footballer and manager
- 1960 – Neil Gaiman, English author, illustrator, and screenwriter
- 1960 – Dan Hawkins, American football player, coach, and sportscaster
- 1960 – Naomi Kawashima, Japanese actress and singer (died 2015)
- 1960 – Maeve Sherlock, English politician
- 1961 – Rudolf Grimm, German-Austrian physicist and academic
- 1961 – John Walton, English darts player
- 1962 – Bob Lindner, Australian rugby league player and coach
- 1962 – Daniel Waters, American director and screenwriter
- 1963 – Hugh Bonneville, English actor
- 1963 – Tommy Davidson, American actor and comedian
- 1963 – Mike McCarthy, American football player and coach
- 1963 – Mike Powell, American long jumper
- 1964 – Kenny Rogers, American baseball player and coach
- 1965 – Jamie Dixon, American basketball player and coach
- 1965 – Eddie Irvine, Northern Irish race car driver
- 1965 – Robert Jones, Welsh rugby player and coach
- 1967 – Jackie Fairweather, Australian runner and coach (died 2014)
- 1968 – Tracy Morgan, American comedian and actor
- 1968 – Tom Papa, American comedian, actor, television host
- 1969 – Faustino Asprilla, Colombian footballer and coach
- 1969 – Jens Lehmann, German footballer and actor
- 1969 – Ellen Pompeo, American actress
- 1970 – Warren G, American rapper and producer
- 1970 – U-God, American rapper
- 1970 – Freddy Loix, Belgian race car driver
- 1970 – Sergei Ovchinnikov, Russian footballer and manager
- 1971 – Big Pun, American rapper (died 2000)
- 1971 – Walton Goggins, American actor and producer
- 1971 – Magnus Johansson, Swedish footballer
- 1971 – Niki Karimi, Iranian actress, director, and screenwriter
- 1972 – Virág Csurgó, Hungarian tennis player
- 1972 – Trevor Devall, Canadian voice actor and podcaster
- 1972 – Shawn Green, American baseball player
- 1973 – Patrik Berger, Czech footballer
- 1973 – Marco Antonio Rodríguez, Mexican footballer and referee
- 1974 – Chris Lilley, Australian comedian and producer
- 1975 – Jim Adkins, American singer-songwriter and guitarist
- 1975 – Markko Märtin, Estonian race car driver
- 1976 – Martin Åslund, Swedish footballer and sportscaster
- 1976 – Sarah Discaya, Filipino businesswoman and politician
- 1976 – Sergio González, Spanish footballer and manager
- 1976 – Jaroslav Hlinka, Czech ice hockey player
- 1976 – Steffen Iversen, Norwegian footballer
- 1976 – Shefki Kuqi, Finnish footballer and manager
- 1976 – Mike Leclerc, Canadian ice hockey player
- 1977 – Josh Barnett, American mixed martial artist and wrestler
- 1977 – Brittany Murphy, American actress and singer (died 2009)
- 1977 – Erik Nevland, Norwegian footballer
- 1978 – Ruth Davidson, Scottish politician
- 1978 – Diplo, American DJ, songwriter, and producer
- 1978 – Eve, American rapper and producer
- 1978 – Kristian Huselius, Swedish ice hockey player
- 1978 – David Paetkau, Canadian actor
- 1979 – Chris Joannou, Australian bass player
- 1979 – Anthony Réveillère, French footballer
- 1979 – Kelly Santos, Brazilian basketball player
- 1979 – Ragnvald Soma, Norwegian footballer
- 1980 – Danilo Belić, Serbian footballer
- 1980 – Troy Bell, American basketball player
- 1981 – Tony Blanco, Dominican baseball player
- 1981 – Jason Dunham, American soldier, Medal of Honor recipient (died 2004)
- 1981 – Paul Kipsiele Koech, Kenyan runner
- 1981 – Ryback, American wrestler
- 1981 – Miroslav Slepička, Czech footballer
- 1982 – Heather Matarazzo, American actress
- 1983 – Miranda Lambert, American singer-songwriter and guitarist
- 1983 – Marius Žaliūkas, Lithuanian footballer (died 2020)
- 1984 – Kazuhisa Makita, Japanese baseball player
- 1984 – Ludovic Obraniak, Polish footballer
- 1984 – Kendrick Perkins, American basketball player
- 1984 – Ahmed Fathy, Egyptian footballer
- 1985 – Ricki-Lee Coulter, New Zealand singer-songwriter and dancer
- 1985 – Aleksandar Kolarov, Serbian footballer
- 1985 – Cherno Samba, Gambian footballer
- 1986 – Aaron Crow, American baseball player
- 1986 – Josh Peck, American actor
- 1986 – Goran Jerković, French footballer
- 1986 – Stanislav Namașco, Moldovan footballer
- 1986 – Eric Thames, American baseball player
- 1986 – Samuel Wanjiru, Kenyan runner (died 2011)
- 1987 – D. J. Augustin, American basketball player
- 1987 – Sam Malsom, English footballer
- 1987 – Kana Oya, Japanese model and actress
- 1987 – Charles Hamilton, American rapper
- 1987 – Theo Peckham, Canadian ice hockey player
- 1988 – Massimo Coda, Italian footballer
- 1988 – Pauleen Luna, Filipino actress
- 1988 – Aiden Tolman, Australian rugby league player
- 1989 – Daniel Agyei, Ghanaian footballer
- 1989 – Taron Egerton, Welsh actor
- 1989 – Brendon Hartley, New Zealand race car driver
- 1989 – Adrian Nikçi, Swiss footballer
- 1989 – Jacob Pullen, American basketball player
- 1990 – Marcus Browne, American boxer
- 1990 – Zach Ertz, American football player
- 1990 – Leo, South Korean singer
- 1990 – Robert Primus, Trinidadian footballer
- 1990 – Kristina Vogel, German track cyclist
- 1991 – Tony Snell, American basketball player
- 1992 – Marko Blaževski, Macedonian swimmer
- 1992 – Teddy Bridgewater, American football player
- 1992 – Mattia Perin, Italian footballer
- 1992 – Dimitri Petratos, Australian footballer
- 1992 – Rafał Wolski, Polish footballer
- 1992 – Wilfried Zaha, Ivorian footballer
- 1993 – Daieishō Hayato, Japanese sumo wrestler
- 1994 – Zoey Deutch, American actress
- 1994 – Andre De Grasse, Canadian sprinter
- 1994 – Claudio Dias, English footballer
- 1995 – Ralfs Grīnbergs, Latvian ice hockey player
- 1995 – Ryan Peniston, British tennis player
- 1996 – Kim Hye-yoon, South Korean actress
- 1996 – Drew Lock, American football player
- 1997 – Federico Dimarco, Italian footballer
- 1997 – Marios Georgiou, Cypriot gymnast
- 1997 – Maurice Gomis, Italian-Senegalese footballer
- 1997 – Daniel James, Welsh footballer
- 1997 – Joost Klein, Dutch musician
- 1997 – Giovanna Scoccimarro, German judoka
- 1997 – Yuriy Vakulko, Ukrainian footballer
- 1998 – Claudine Co, Filipino singer and influencer
- 1998 – Karen Villanueva, Mexican rhythmic gymnast
- 1999 – Armand Duplantis, Swedish-American pole vaulter
- 1999 – Michael Cimino, American actor
- 1999 – Hugo Duro, Spanish footballer
- 1999 – João Félix, Portuguese footballer
- 1999 – Michael J. Keplinger, Austrian musician and filmmaker
- 1999 – Kiernan Shipka, American actress
- 2000 – Mackenzie Foy, American actress and model
- 2000 – Scotty Pippen Jr., American basketball player
- 2000 – Oliver Sonne, Danish-Peruvian footballer
- 2002 – Eduardo Camavinga, French footballer
- 2003 – Luca Del Bel Belluz, Canadian ice hockey player
- 2006 – Hong Eunchae, South Korean singer
- 2009 – Christian Convery, Canadian actor

== Deaths ==
=== Pre-1600 ===
- 461 – Pope Leo I
- 474 – Leo II, Byzantine emperor (born 467)
- 901 – Adelaide of Paris (born 850)
- 948 – Zhao Yanshou, Chinese general and governor
- 1066 – John Scotus, bishop of Mecklenburg
- 1068 – Agnes of Burgundy, Duchess of Aquitaine, regent of Aquitaine
- 1187 – Guðrøðr Óláfsson, King of the Isles
- 1241 – Pope Celestine IV
- 1258 – William de Bondington, Bishop of Glasgow
- 1290 – Al-Mansur Qalawun, Sultan of Egypt (born c. 1222)
- 1293 – Isabella de Forz, Countess of Devon (born 1237)
- 1299 – John I, Count of Holland (born 1284)
- 1444 – Władysław III of Poland (born 1424)
- 1549 – Pope Paul III (born 1468)
- 1556 – Richard Chancellor, English explorer(born c. 1521)

=== 1601–1900 ===
- 1617 – Barnabe Rich, English soldier and author (born 1540)
- 1624 – Henry Wriothesley, 3rd Earl of Southampton, English politician, Lord Lieutenant of Hampshire (born 1573)
- 1644 – Luis Vélez de Guevara, Spanish author and playwright (born 1579)
- 1659 – Afzal Khan, Indian commander
- 1673 – Michał Korybut Wiśniowiecki, King of Poland (born 1640)
- 1727 – Alphonse de Tonty, French-American sailor and explorer (born 1659)
- 1728 – Fyodor Apraksin, Russian admiral (born 1661)
- 1772 – Pedro Correia Garção, Portuguese poet and author (born 1724)
- 1777 – Cornstalk, American tribal chief (born 1720)
- 1808 – Guy Carleton, 1st Baron Dorchester, Irish-born English general and politician, 21st Governor General of Canada (born 1724)
- 1852 – Gideon Mantell, English scientist (born 1790)
- 1865 – Henry Wirz, Swiss-American captain in Confederate army, commandant of Andersonville Prison (born 1823)
- 1869 – John E. Wool, American general (born 1784)
- 1873 – Maria Jane Williams, Welsh musician and folklorist (born circa 1794)
- 1887 – Louis Lingg, German-American carpenter and activist (born 1864)
- 1891 – Arthur Rimbaud, French poet and educator (born 1854)

=== 1901–present ===
- 1909 – George Essex Evans, Australian poet and educator (born 1863)
- 1928 – Anita Berber, German dancer (born 1899)
- 1936 – Louis Gustave Binger, French general and explorer (born 1856)
- 1938 – Mustafa Kemal Atatürk, founder of the Republic of Turkey, Turkish field marshal and statesman, 1st President of Turkey (born 1881)
- 1941 – Carrie Derick, Canadian botanist and geneticist (born 1862)
- 1944 – Claude Rodier, physicist (born 1903)
- 1946 – Louis Zutter, Swiss gymnast (born 1856)
- 1956 – Gordon MacQuarrie, American author and journalist (born 1900)
- 1962 – Julius Lenhart, Austrian gymnast and engineer (born 1875)
- 1963 – Klára Dán von Neumann, Hungarian-American computer scientist (born 1911)
- 1971 – Walter Van Tilburg Clark, American author and academic (born 1909)
- 1975 – Ernest M. McSorley, Canadian-American captain (born 1912)
- 1982 – Leonid Brezhnev, Ukrainian-Russian general and politician, 4th Head of State of the Soviet Union (born 1906)
- 1982 – Helen Sharsmith, American biologist and educator (b. 1905)
- 1984 – Xavier Herbert, Australian author (born 1901)
- 1986 – Rogelio de la Rosa, Filipino actor and politician (born 1916)
- 1986 – Gordon Richards, English jockey and manager (born 1904)
- 1987 – Noor Hossain, Bangladeshi activist (born 1961)
- 1989 – Cookie Mueller, American actress, writer and Dreamlander
- 1990 – Aurelio Monteagudo, Cuban baseball player and manager (born 1943)
- 1990 – Mário Schenberg, Brazilian physicist and academic (born 1914)
- 1991 – Marjorie Abbatt, English toy-maker and businesswoman (born 1899)
- 1991 – William Afflis, American football player and wrestler (born 1929)
- 1992 – Chuck Connors, American actor (born 1921)
- 1994 – Kuvempu, Indian author and poet (born 1904)
- 1994 – Carmen McRae, American singer, pianist, and actress (born 1920)
- 1995 – Ken Saro-Wiwa, Nigerian author and activist (born 1941)
- 1998 – Mary Millar, English actress (born 1936)
- 2000 – Adamantios Androutsopoulos, Greek lawyer and politician, 171st Prime Minister of Greece (born 1919)
- 2000 – Jacques Chaban-Delmas, French general and politician, 153rd Prime Minister of France (born 1915)
- 2001 – Ken Kesey, American novelist, essayist, and poet (born 1935)
- 2002 – Michel Boisrond, French actor, director, and screenwriter (born 1921)
- 2003 – Canaan Banana, Zimbabwean minister and politician, 1st President of Zimbabwe (born 1936)
- 2003 – Irv Kupcinet, American journalist and talk show host (born 1912)
- 2004 – Katy de la Cruz, Filipino-American singer and actress (born 1907)
- 2004 – Şeref Görkey, Turkish footballer and manager (born 1913)
- 2006 – Diana Coupland, English actress and singer (born 1932)
- 2006 – Fokko du Cloux, Dutch mathematician and computer scientist (born 1954)
- 2006 – Gerald Levert, American singer-songwriter and producer (born 1966)
- 2006 – Jack Palance, American boxer and actor (born 1919)
- 2006 – Nadarajah Raviraj, Sri Lankan lawyer and politician (born 1962)
- 2006 – Jack Williamson, American author, critic, and academic (born 1908)
- 2007 – Laraine Day, American actress (born 1920)
- 2007 – Augustus F. Hawkins, American engineer and politician (born 1907)
- 2007 – Norman Mailer, American novelist and essayist (born 1923)
- 2008 – Wannes Van de Velde, Belgian singer and poet (born 1937)
- 2008 – Kiyosi Itô, Japanese mathematician and academic (born 1915)
- 2009 – Robert Enke, German footballer (born 1977)
- 2009 – John Allen Muhammad, American spree killer (born 1960)
- 2010 – Dino De Laurentiis, Italian-American actor, producer, and production manager (born 1919)
- 2011 – Peter J. Biondi, American soldier and politician (born 1942)
- 2011 – Ivan Martin Jirous, Czech poet (born 1944)
- 2011 – Killer Karl Kox, American professional wrestler (born 1931)
- 2012 – John Louis Coffey, American lawyer and judge (born 1922)
- 2012 – Mitsuko Mori, Japanese actress (born 1920)
- 2012 – Piet van Zeil, Dutch lawyer and politician, Dutch Minister of Economic Affairs (born 1927)
- 2013 – Vijaydan Detha, Indian author (born 1926)
- 2013 – John Grant, Australian neurosurgeon (born 1922)
- 2013 – John Matchefts, American ice hockey player and coach (born 1931)
- 2013 – Giorgio Orelli, Swiss poet and translator (born 1921)
- 2014 – Josip Boljkovac, Croatian soldier and politician, 1st Croatia Minister of the Interior (born 1920)
- 2014 – Wayne Goss, Australian lawyer and politician, 34th Premier of Queensland (born 1951)
- 2014 – John Hans Krebs, American lawyer and politician (born 1926)
- 2014 – Dorian "Doc" Paskowitz, American surfer and physician (born 1921)
- 2014 – Al Renfrew, American ice hockey player and coach (born 1924)
- 2015 – Gene Amdahl, American computer scientist, physicist, and engineer, founded the Amdahl Corporation (born 1922)
- 2015 – Pat Eddery, Irish jockey and trainer (born 1952)
- 2015 – André Glucksmann, French philosopher and author (born 1937)
- 2015 – Helmut Schmidt, German soldier, economist, and politician, 5th Chancellor of Germany (born 1918)
- 2015 – Allen Toussaint, American singer-songwriter, pianist, and producer (born 1938)
- 2020 – Saeb Erekat, Chief Palestinian negotiator (born 1955)
- 2021 – Miroslav Žbirka, Slovak singer, songwriter and guitarist (born 1952)
- 2022 – Kevin Conroy, American actor and voice actor, longtime voice of Batman (born 1955)
- 2024 – Tim Sullivan, American novelist (born 1948)

== Holidays and observances ==
- Christian feast day:
  - Adelin of Séez
  - Áed mac Bricc
  - Andrew Avellino
  - Baudolino
  - Demetrius of Antioch
  - Elaeth
  - Grellan
  - Justus
  - Lübeck martyrs
  - Pope Leo I
  - Monitor
  - Theoctiste
  - Tryphena and Tryphosa
  - November 10 (Eastern Orthodox liturgics)
- Cry of Independence Day (Panama)
- Day of Remembrance of Atatürk (Turkey)
- Day of Russian Militsiya (Russia)
- Heroes Day (Indonesia) or Hari Pahlawan
- Martinisingen (Germany)
- United States Marine Corps birthday (United States)
- World Keratoconus Day
- World Science Day for Peace and Development
