= Cookie Mueller (photo series) =

Photo series by Nan Goldin

- Mueller and Goldin in a photo from the series.
- Author: Nan Goldin
- Language: English
- Subject: Photobook

Cookie Mueller (also called Cookie Mueller: Photographs, Cookie Mueller, 1949–1989 and The Cookie Portfolio 1976–89) is a series of photographs of actress and writer Cookie Mueller taken by Nan Goldin. The series includes photographs of Mueller taken across the length of Mueller and Goldin's friendship. It also includes posthumous photographs of Mueller, her husband Vittorio Scarpati, and their New York City apartment shortly after their deaths. The series was published as a book by Pace/MacGill Gallery.

== Background ==
Cookie Mueller and Nan Goldin became friends while living in Provincetown in the summer of 1976. Goldin, then a student at Boston's School of the Museum of Fine Arts, met Mueller at the latter's yard sale. The two traveled together across the American East Coast and the Amalfi Coast in Italy.

== Photographs ==
While Goldin took hundreds of photographs of Mueller throughout her life, this series contains 15 cibachrome prints of photos from 1976, when the two women met, through 1989, the year Mueller died.

Goldin was traveling when Mueller first fell seriously ill from AIDS. Goldin returned to New York City in August 1989, and found Mueller so weak from her illness that she was unable to talk. However, Goldin said, "[W]hen I photographed [Cookie] she spoke to me, she was as present as ever."

=== List of Photographs ===
- cookie + sharon dancing at the Back Room, Provincetown, 1976
- cookie w. max at my birthday party. Provincetown, 1977
- cookie + millie in the girls' room at the Mudd Club. NYC, 1979
- cookie at Tin Pan Alley. NYC, 1983
- cookie laughing. NYC, 1985
- cookie + vittorio's wedding: the ring NYC, 1986
- cookie w. me after I was hit at S.P.E. conference. Baltimore, Md., 1986
- cookie in the bathroom at Hawaii 5-0. NYC, 1986
- cookie in the garden of Ciro's. Provincetown, Sept., 1989
- cookie + sharon on the bed, Provincetown, 1989
- cookie at vittorio's casket. NYC, 1989
- cookie + max at home. NYC. Sept., 1989
- cookie being x-rayed. NYC, Oct., 1989
- cookie in her casket. NYC, 1989
- cookie + vittorio's living room. NYC, Christmas, 1989

The photograph "cookie at Tin Pan Alley. NYC, 1983" was "lit by movie lights" because it was taken during the filming of Variety.

== Publications and Exhibitions ==
Six days after Mueller's death, Goldin's show "Witnesses: Against Our Vanishing" opened in New York. The series was a multi-artist show at Artists Space that included drawings from Vittorio Scarpati, Mueller's husband, who had died shortly before her. The show dealt frankly with issues related to living and dying with HIV/AIDS. On its opening night, demonstrators protested against censorship outside. Scarpati's images were compiled and published in Putti's Pudding the following year.

Goldin first exhibited the Cookie Mueller photo series at Pace/MacGill Gallery in 1990. Pace/MacGill published the series as a book later the same year.
