= Final Reward =

- Directed by: Rachid Kerdouche
- Starring: Richard Hell; Cookie Mueller; Teri Toye; John Sex; Bill Rice
- Music by: Richard Sohl
- Release date: 1978
- Running time: 67 minutes
- Country: United States
- Language: English

Final Reward is a 1978 American underground film noir. It was directed by Rachid Kerdouche in his directorial debut. Shot in black-and-white in SoHo, Manhattan, the film stars Richard Hell in his first leading role, alongside writer-actress Cookie Mueller, model Teri Toye, performance artist John Sex, and painter Bill Rice. The score was composed by Richard Sohl, keyboardist of the Patti Smith Group.

Hell plays Crash, the former "king" of the downtown scene who, upon being released from jail, finds his lover (Cookie Mueller) living with Sam (Teri Toye) and assembles his old crew for a robbery.

Production materials and original film and video elements relating to Final Reward are preserved in the Richard Hell Papers (MSS.140) at the Fales Library and Special Collections at New York University. The film received very limited public exhibition; a rare screening was presented by Hell at the Cinémathèque française in Paris on 7 April 2006, as part of an avant-garde cinema program.

== Cast ==
- Richard Hell as Crash
- Cookie Mueller
- Teri Toye as Sam
- John Sex
- Bill Rice
- Geoffrey Carey
- John Heys
- Donna Death
- Robin Harvey
- Rudy Laurent
- Paris Raves

== Reception ==
The author Zack Carlson wrote, "A dimly lit, shoestring Jean-Pierre Melville adventure ably piloted by Hell, Mueller, Bill Rice and other members of NY's limited-means cinema scene, the film deserves more attention than it's received." The Pittsburgh City Paper called the film an "hour-long, black-and-white oddity".
