= Walking Through Clear Water in a Pool Painted Black =

Anthology of prose by Cookie Mueller

- Author: Cookie Mueller
- Language: English
- Genre: Anthology
- Publisher: semiotext(e)
- Publication date: 1990
- Publication place: United States of America
- Media type: Print (hardback)
- Pages: 429

Walking Through Clear Water in a Pool Painted Black is a posthumous anthology of writings by Cookie Mueller, the American actress and writer. The anthology includes essays, memoirs, and stories written by Mueller, as well as selections from her advice column, Ask Dr. Mueller. The book also includes Mueller's eulogy to Jean-Michel Basquiat.

The title was chosen by semiotext(e)'s founder, Sylvère Lotringer, and came from a line in Mueller's story "Route 95 South–Baltimore to Orlando": 'The sky was like black cotton batting that enveloped us in a way that felt like walking through clear water in a pool painted black.'

The book was originally published in 1990 as part of semiotext(e)'s Native Agents series, which focused primarily on American women writers. A 2022 rerelease by semiotext(e) included an expanded selection of her writing. It also included four previously unpublished works.
