= Polk County Homestead and Trust Company Addition Historic District =

Historic district in Iowa, United States

- U.S. National Register of Historic Places
- U.S. Historic district
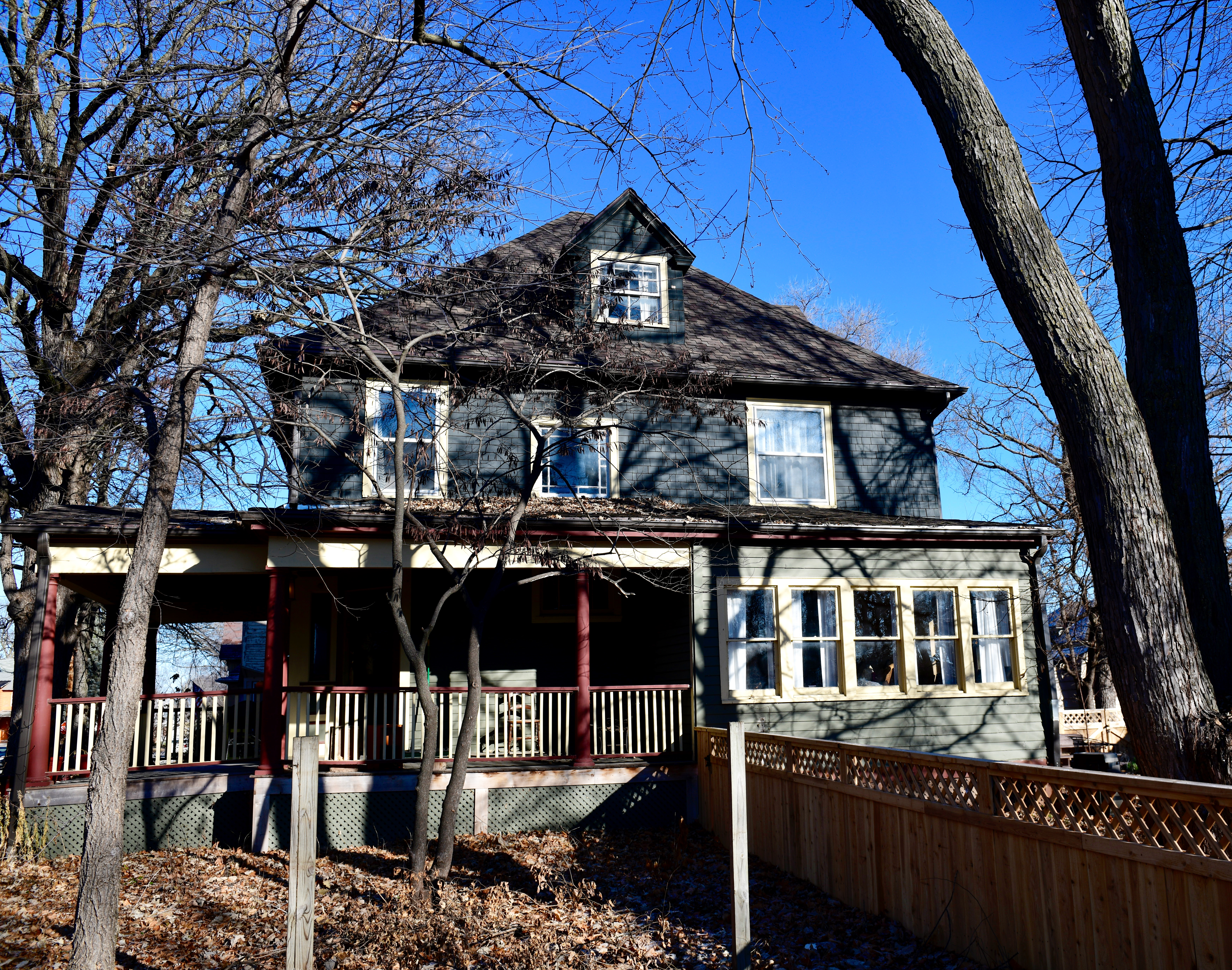
- House at 1721 7th St. (1896)

- Location within Iowa Location within the United States
- Location: Both sides of 7th & 8th Sts., S. of Franklin & N. of College Aves., Des Moines, Iowa
- Coordinates: 41°36′34″N 93°37′39″W
- Area: 20 acres (8.1 ha)
- Architectural style: Late Victorian; Late 19th and 20th Century Revivals; Late 19th and Early 20th Century American Movements
- MPS: Towards a Greater Des Moines MPS
- NRHP reference No.: 16000687
- Added to NRHP: October 4, 2016

The Polk County Homestead and Trust Company Addition Historic District is a nationally recognized historic district located in Des Moines, Iowa, United States. It was listed on the National Register of Historic Places in 2016. At the time of its nomination the district consisted of 86 resources, including 48 contributing buildings, 11 contributing structures, 18 non-contributing buildings, and nine non-contributing structures. The end of the 19th century saw the rise of the Victorian suburbs around Des Moines. This was a period of economic growth for the metropolitan area. The largest of these suburbs was North Des Moines. It was connected to Des Moines by way of three streetcar lines, which added to its attractiveness. Local real estate investors established the Polk County Homestead & Trust Co. to develop the northern portion of North Des Moines in partnership with the Prospect Park Improvement Company.

This area was platted in 1884. Polk County Homestead & Trust Co. bought this property from the Prospect Park Improvement Company, and the two advertised the addition together. The streets, alleys, and large town lots of the plat are laid out on a grid, which differs from the surrounding area's curvilinear streets and irregular lots further north and more erratic development to the south. The historic district's period of significance is 1886 when the first house was built, to 1945 when some of the single-family dwellings were converted into multi-family dwellings. The addition is dominated by the Late Victorian and Colonial Revival styles. The Queen Anne style was popular in this middle and upper-middle-class neighborhood before the Panic of 1893. Five houses are individually listed on the National Register of Historic Places: the Lowry W. and Hattie N. Goode House (1886), the Chaffee-Hunter House (1886), the Dr. John B. and Anna M. Hatton House (c. 1887), the Dr. Anna E. and Andrew A. Johnstone House (1887), and the William A. and Etta Baum Cottage (1891). The former Norman Wiles Seventh-day Adventist School (c. 1925) is the only institutional building in the historic district.
