= William A. and Etta Baum Cottage =

Historic house in Iowa, United States

- U.S. National Register of Historic Places
- U.S. Historic district – Contributing property
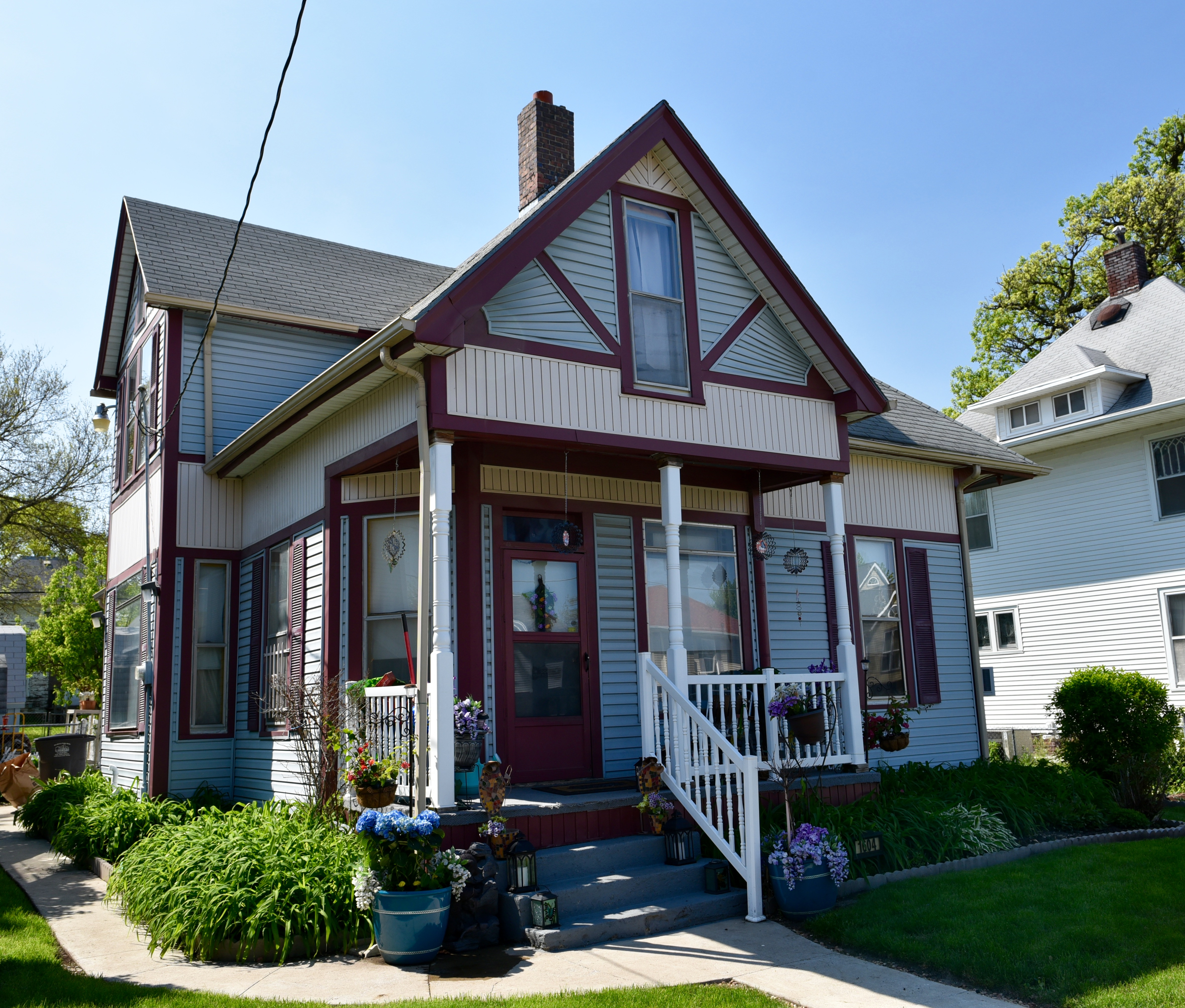

- Location within Iowa Location within the United States
- Location: 1604 8th St. Des Moines, Iowa
- Coordinates: 41°36′28.8″N 93°37′42.5″W
- Area: less than one acre
- Built: 1891
- Architectural style: Queen Anne
- Part of: Polk County Homestead and Trust Company Addition Historic District (ID16000687)
- MPS: Towards a Greater Des Moines MPS
- NRHP reference No.: 96001147
- Added to NRHP: October 25, 1996

The William A. and Etta Baum Cottage is a historic building located in Des Moines, Iowa, United States. Built in 1891, the 1½-story structure features a gable-end facade, brick foundation, and a small front porch with a gable-end roof. It is considered a good example of the gable-on-hip subtype of the Queen Anne cottage. There were only a few that were built with 1½-stories as most were two-stories. Its significance is based on how it demonstrates that a modest-sized dwelling can embrace the picturesque design. The cottage was individually listed on the National Register of Historic Places in 1996. It was included as a contributing property in the Polk County Homestead and Trust Company Addition Historic District in 2016.
