= Dr. Anna E. and Andrew A. Johnstone House =

Historic house in Iowa, United States

- U.S. National Register of Historic Places
- U.S. Historic district – Contributing property
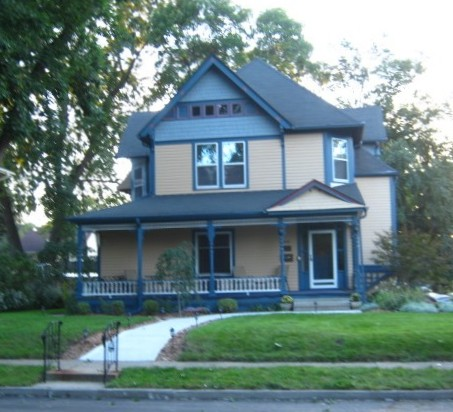

- Location within Iowa Location within the United States
- Location: 1830 8th St. Des Moines, Iowa
- Coordinates: 41°36′40″N 93°37′42.6″W
- Built: 1887
- Architectural style: Queen Anne
- Part of: Polk County Homestead and Trust Company Addition Historic District (ID16000687)
- MPS: Towards a Greater Des Moines MPS
- NRHP reference No.: 96001152
- Added to NRHP: October 25, 1996

The Dr. Anna E. and Andrew A. Johnstone House (also known as the Royal House) is a historic house in Des Moines, Iowa, United States. Built circa 1887, the house also hosted Dr. Anna Johnstone's osteopathy clinic from about 1906 to 1945. The building was individually listed on the National Register of Historic Places in 1996. It was included as a contributing property in the Polk County Homestead and Trust Company Addition Historic District in 2016. The house was listed on the National Register for reflecting the rise of women in medicine and other professions in the Progressive Era, and for its Queen Anne architecture with extensive spindlework.

It was a 10-room house, on a triple lot.

Anna E. Johnstone was a teacher before marrying. Andrew A. Johnstone owned a china and glassware store in downtown Des Moines. They had two daughters. Andrew died of a stroke in 1892. Anna sold Andrew's business, moved with the children to a rented apartment, and rented out the house. She sold insurance and real estate and returned to school, receiving a medical degree in 1900 and becoming a doctor of osteopathy, and one of the first women to accomplish that. She moved back into the house and used part of it to operate her osteopathy practice.

Anna was a student of Dr. Summerfield S. Still, who ran an osteopathic hospital and school in downtown Des Moines, and lived in North Des Moines.

The house was still in the family in 2013: it was owned and occupied by Jon Royal, a great-grandson of Anna E. and Andrew A Johnstone.

Anna Johnstone died in 1948.
