= Putti's Pudding =

Art book by Vittorio Scarpati and Cookie Mueller

- An image from Putti's Pudding, drawn by Vittorio Scarpati.
- Editor: Edit DeAk
- Author: Cookie Mueller and Vittorio Scarpati
- Illustrator: Vittorio Scarpati
- Language: English, Japanese
- Series: Art Random
- Release number: 11
- Subject: AIDS, art, illness
- Genre: Artist's book
- Publisher: Kyoto Shoin International
- Publication date: 1989
- Publication place: Japan
- Media type: Print (hardcover)
- Pages: 48
- ISBN: 978-4-7636-8544-5
- OCLC: 22577599

Putti's Pudding is a book of sketches and drawings by Italian artist Vittorio Scarpati reflecting on his experience dying of AIDS-related pneumonia. The book features a preface and introduction by his wife Cookie Mueller, who was also HIV-positive.

== Background ==
Scarpati and Mueller met in 1983 in Positano, Italy. They were married in 1986, on a rooftop in the East Village, New York. After the ceremony, they threw a party at the loft of artist Joseph Kosuth. This wedding was photographed by Nan Goldin and included in her Cookie Mueller photo series in 1990.

Both Mueller and Scarpati were addicted to heroin, the likely source of their HIV infections.

== Composition ==
In 1989, Scarpati was admitted to Manhattan's Cabrini Medical Center five months before dying of pneumonia. During his hospital stay, he drew many pictures chronicling his experience in the hospital and reflecting on his illness. While Scarpati had worked as an animator, graphic artist, and sculpture restorer, according to Mueller, he "couldn't bring himself to sit down and do his own work" until AIDS intervened.

Scarpati finished about three hundred pen-and-ink drawings in three months while confined to his hospital bed. Over a hundred of these drawings were exhibited at 56 Bleecker Gallery before his death.

== Death ==
Scarpati died of AIDS-related pneumonia on September 14, 1989. Mueller died on November 10, 1989. At the end of Scarpati's life, the couple shared a hospital room at Cabrini Medical Center.

== Exhibitions and publications ==
Scarpati's drawings were exhibited in 1989 at New York's 56 Bleecker gallery. A few months later, they were included in "Witnesses: Against Our Vanishing," a mulit-artist show curated by Nan Goldin at Artists Space. This exhibit ran from November 16, 1989 to January 6, 1990. Scarpati's work was shown alongside work by 24 other artists, including David Armstrong, Tom Chesley, and Philip-Lorca diCorcia. On opening night, demonstrators protested censorship directly outside the gallery.

The next year, Kyoto Shoin International published a selection of Scarpati's drawings in the book Putti's Pudding, with a preface by Mueller. Putti's Pudding was a term Scarpati used to describe the "piles of angels" he liked to draw. The book features 45 illustrations from Scarpati's notebooks, as well as a preface by Mueller.

In 2017, Scarpati's drawings were exhibited at Studio Voltaire. This was the first exhibition of Scarpati's drawings in the UK.

In 2025, Devon Vander Voort and Jarrett McCusker presented Scarpati's drawings at an exhibit called "Lines of Resistance: Vittorio Scarpati's Drawings in the Face of AIDS." The exhibit ran at 279 Broome Street, New York, from April 3 to May 9, 2025. The exhibit included ephemera from Scarpati and Mueller's relationship, including photographs of their lives in Italy and their Manhattan rooftop wedding. A proof copy of Putti's Pudding was also included.
