= World Keratoconus Day =

Observance dedicated to eye disorder keratoconus

World Keratoconus Day is an observance dedicated to keratoconus. It falls on November 10.
