= Teri Toye =

American model

Teri Toye is a former model and historic preservationist from Des Moines, Iowa. She is widely regarded as the first successful openly transgender model in the United States, and is best known for her work with designers such as Stephen Strouse, Thierry Mugler, and Jean Paul Gaultier.

== Early life and modeling career ==
Toye was born and raised in Des Moines, Iowa with one sister. In the late 1970s, she moved to New York City to study fashion at Parsons School of Design, though she later dropped out as her modeling career took off. While a student there, she began her gender transition. Toye met Steven Meisel at a party thrown by Gabriel Rotello, and began modeling for an illustration class that he taught at Parsons. She became involved in the downtown culture of the East Village in the early 1980s, frequenting clubs such as Studio 54 and meeting designers like Stephen Sprouse. Toye rose to prominence as a model after serving as Sprouse's muse and walking in his 1984 show at The Ritz night club.

In 1984, she was named "Girl of the Year" by New York Times fashion columnist John Duka. Toye was represented by Frances Grill of Click, walked in shows internationally for Chanel, and appeared in editorials for Interview. Toye also became friends with artists of the East Village scene, including Nan Goldin and Greer Lankton. She was Lankton's maid of honor and the subject of a doll by Lankton, which has been exhibited at galleries like Civilian Warfare and Participant Inc.

== Historic preservation work ==
In 1987, Toye married art dealer Patrick Fox and moved back to Des Moines. She became involved in real estate and local advocacy groups for the preservation of historic homes, and continues to work as a specialist for FEMA consulting on historic preservation and renovation. In 1993, Toye and Fox purchased the Hatton House, a 130-year old Stick style home in the River Bend neighborhood. Toye prevented the destruction of the house and preserved original features using a grant from the State Historic Preservation Office in the Iowa Department of Natural Resources. When Toye and Fox divorced in 1995, she retained full ownership of the home.
