= Lowry W. and Hattie N. Goode First North Des Moines House =

Historic house in Iowa, United States

- U.S. National Register of Historic Places
- U.S. Historic district – Contributing property
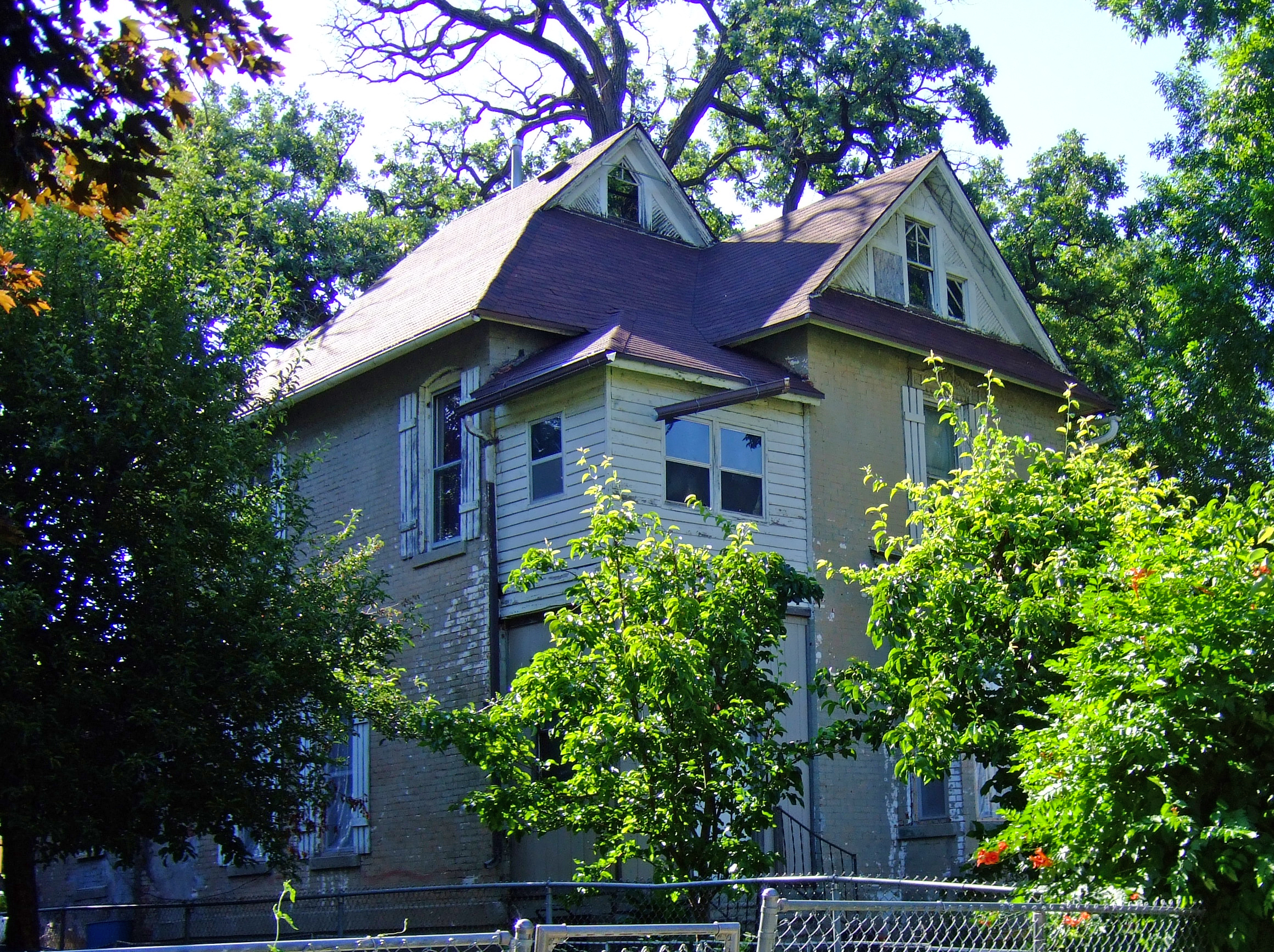

- Location within Iowa Location within the United States
- Location: 1813 7th St. Des Moines, Iowa
- Coordinates: 41°36′38.7″N 93°37′36.1″W
- Area: less than one acre
- Built: 1884
- Architectural style: Late Victorian
- Part of: Polk County Homestead and Trust Company Addition Historic District (ID16000687)
- MPS: Towards a Greater Des Moines MPS
- NRHP reference No.: 98001280
- Added to NRHP: October 22, 1998

The Lowry W. and Hattie N. Goode First North Des Moines House, also known as the Allabach House, is a historic building located in Des Moines, Iowa, United States. The Late Victorian-style single-family dwelling is significant for its association with Lowry W. Goode. Goode was a prominent real estate developer in the Des Moines area in the 19th century. Built c. 1884 in what was the suburb of North Des Moines, this house is one of the last resources that calls attention to his work. The Goode's themselves built and occupied several houses in North Des Moines, and they lived here for about one year after it was built. They then used it as a rental property for a while until they sold it. The two-story brick structure features a main block with a rectangular plan, intersecting gables, a single-story bay window on the west elevation, a two-story extension on the south elevation, and a rear wing. The original porch has been removed. The house was individually listed on the National Register of Historic Places in 1998. It was included as a contributing property in the Polk County Homestead and Trust Company Addition Historic District in 2016.
