= USS Jason Dunham =

Destroyer in the US Navy

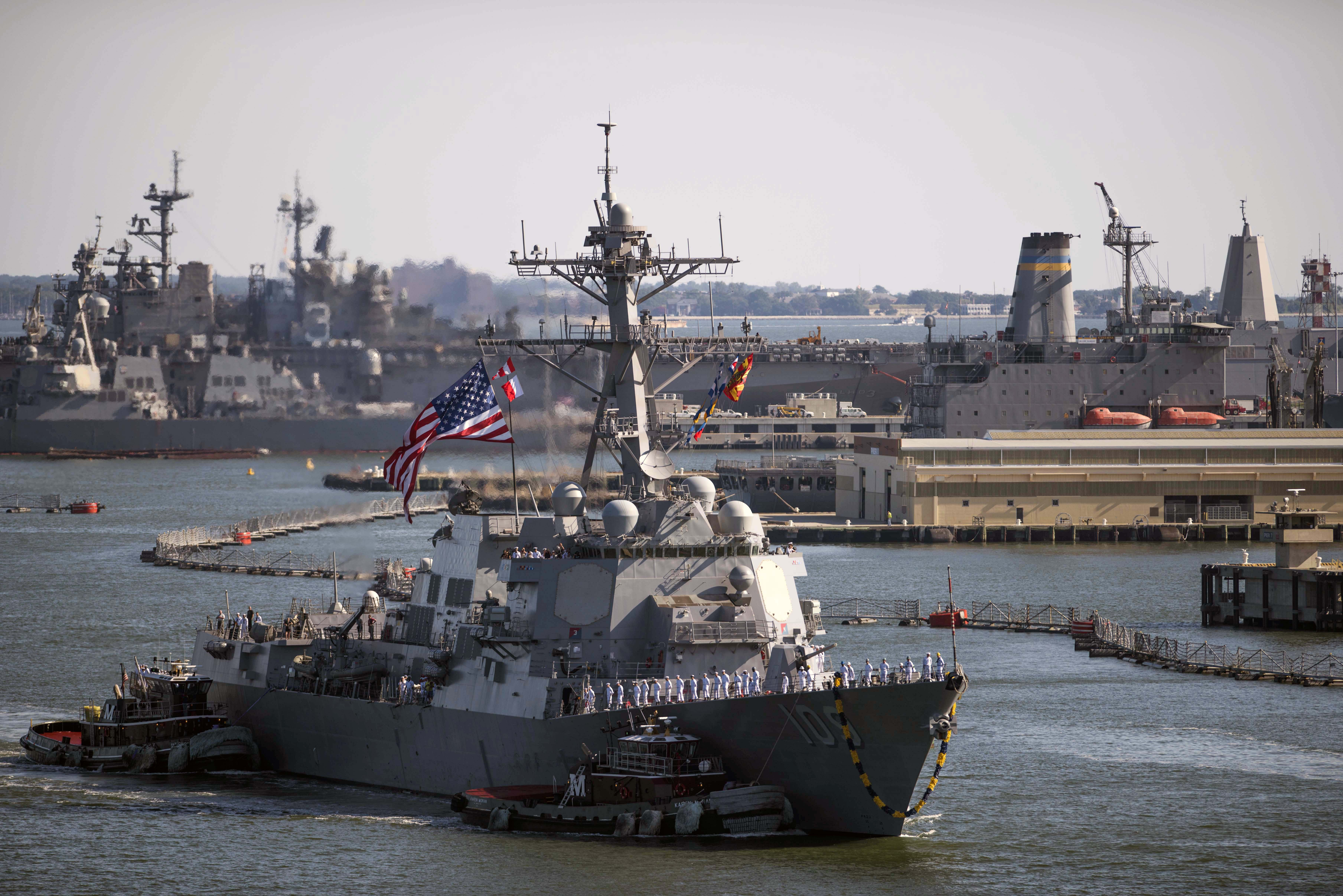
- USS Jason Dunham in August 2015

History

United States
- Name: Jason Dunham
- Namesake: Jason Dunham
- Awarded: 13 September 2002
- Builder: Bath Iron Works
- Laid down: 11 April 2008
- Launched: 1 August 2009
- Sponsored by: Debra Dunham
- Commissioned: 13 November 2010
- Home port: Mayport
- Identification: MMSI number: 369970347; Callsign: NJDM; Hull number: DDG-109
- Motto: Semper Fidelis, Semper Fortis; (Always faithful, always strong)
- Status: in active service
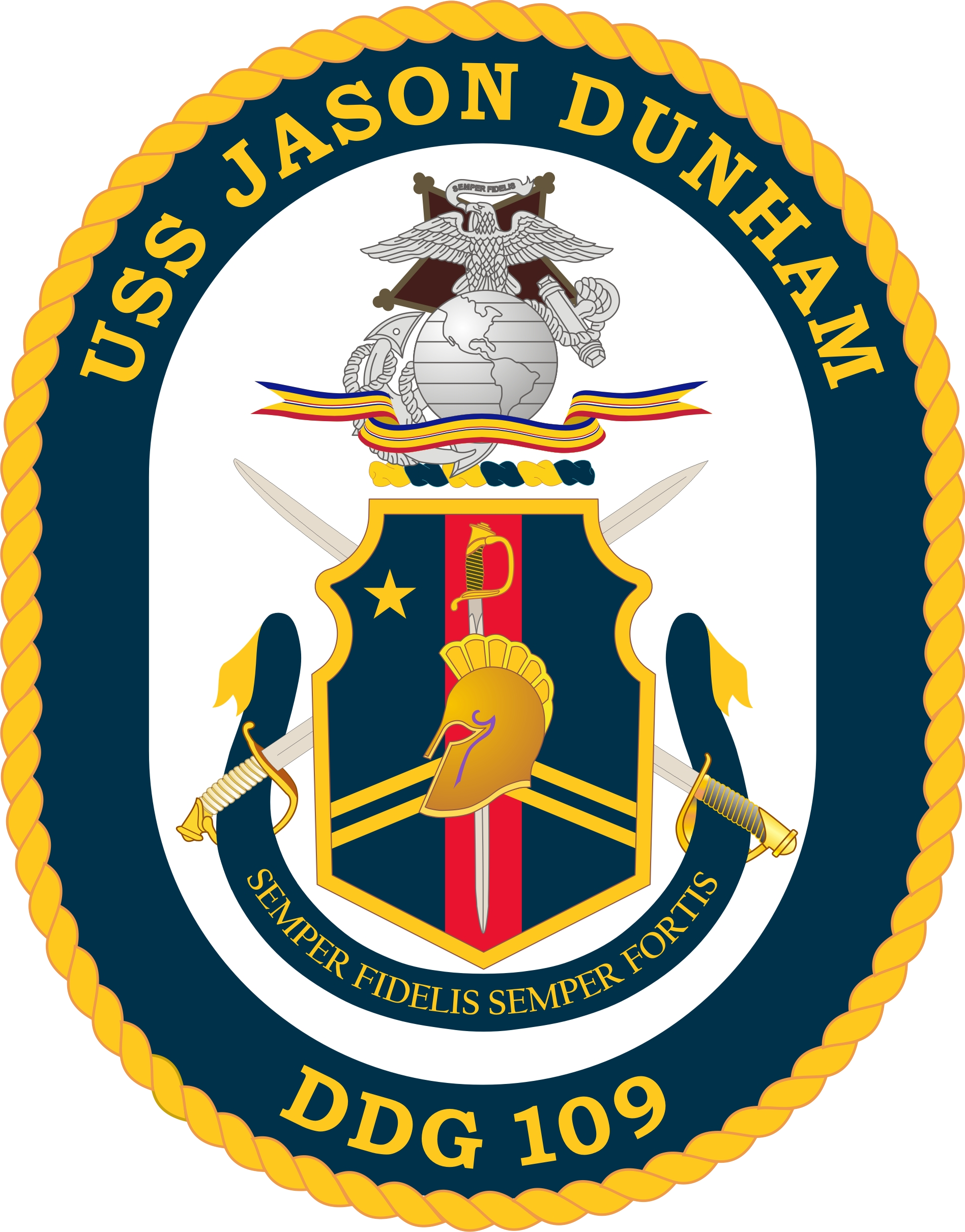
- Badge

General characteristics
- Class & type: Arleigh Burke-class destroyer
- Displacement: 9,200 long tons (9,300 t)
- Length: 510 ft (160 m)
- Beam: 66 ft (20 m)
- Draft: 33 ft (10 m)
- Propulsion: 4 × General Electric LM2500-30 gas turbines, 2 shafts, 100,000 shp (75 MW)
- Speed: >30 kn (56 km/h; 35 mph)
- Complement: 380 officers and enlisted
- Armament: Guns: 1 × 5-inch (127 mm)/62 Mk 45 Mod 4 (lightweight gun); 1 × 20 mm (0.8 in) Phalanx CIWS; 2 × 25 mm (0.98 in) Mk 38 machine gun system; 4 × 0.50 in (12.7 mm) caliber guns; Missiles: 1 × 32-cell, 1 × 64-cell (96 total cells) Mk 41 vertical launching system (VLS): RIM-66M surface-to-air missile; RIM-156 surface-to-air missile; RIM-174A Standard ERAM; RIM-161 anti-ballistic missile; RIM-162 ESSM (quad-packed); BGM-109 Tomahawk cruise missile; RUM-139 vertical launch ASROC; Torpedoes: 2 × Mark 32 triple torpedo tubes: Mark 46 lightweight torpedo; Mark 50 lightweight torpedo; Mark 54 lightweight torpedo
- Aircraft carried: 2 × MH-60R Seahawk helicopters

USS Jason Dunham (DDG-109) is an Arleigh Burke-class (Flight IIA) Aegis guided missile destroyer in the United States Navy. She is named after US Marine Corps corporal Jason Dunham, who was posthumously awarded the Medal of Honor for service in the Iraq War. She was built by the Bath Iron Works in Bath, Maine. She was christened by Corporal Dunham's mother, Debra Dunham, the ship's sponsor, and launched on 1 August 2009. Jason Dunham was commissioned on 13 November 2010.

== Ship's history ==
In May 2022, Jason Dunham was homeported out of Naval Station Mayport and a part of Destroyer Squadron 28, along with Carrier Strike Group 8 led by the aircraft carrier USS Harry S. Truman.

In August 2025, Jason Dunham sailed for Venezuela and the Caribbean Sea. The destroyer was among the warships ordered to the area to combat drug smuggling traffic. On 4 September, in response to the presence of U.S. Navy warships in the region, two Venezuelan F-16 fighter jets conducted a flyover of Jason Dunham, after which Trump gave permission to shoot down Venezuelan planes if they presented a danger to U.S. ships.
