= Chaffee–Hunter House =

Historic house in Iowa, United States

- Chaffee-Hunter House
- U.S. National Register of Historic Places
- U.S. Historic district – Contributing property
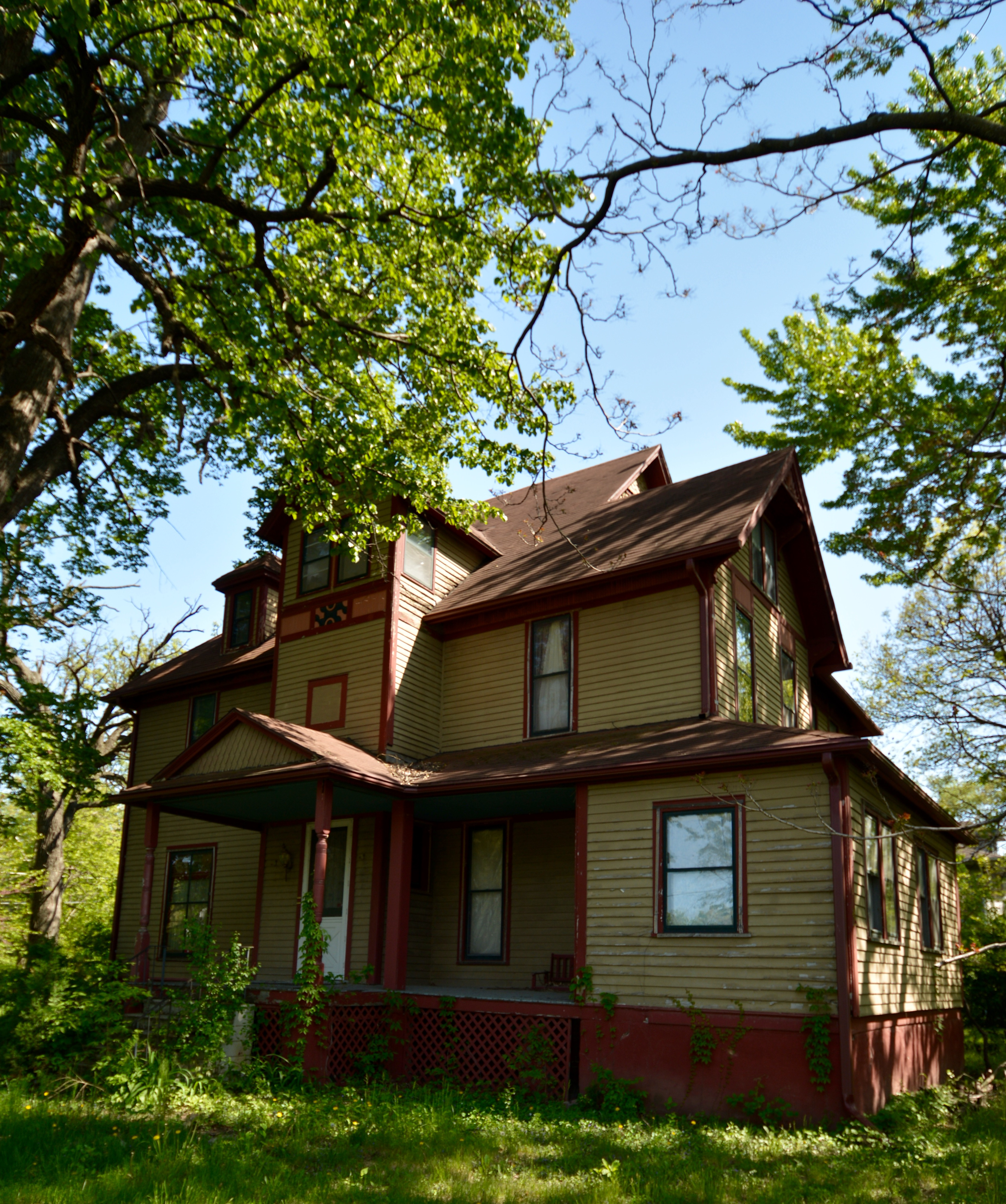

- Location within Iowa Location within the United States
- Location: 1821 8th St. Des Moines, Iowa
- Coordinates: 41°36′39.8″N 93°37′40.4″W
- Area: less than one acre
- Built: 1886
- Architectural style: Queen Anne
- Part of: Polk County Homestead and Trust Company Addition Historic District (ID16000687)
- MPS: Towards a Greater Des Moines MPS
- NRHP reference No.: 98001274
- Added to NRHP: October 22, 1998

The Chaffee–Hunter House is a historic building located in Des Moines, Iowa, United States. Built in 1886, the single-family dwelling is named for its first two residents, Henry L. Chaffee and Edward H. Hunter, who bought it from Chaffee in 1891. The house calls attention to Hunter, who served as the local postmaster from 1894 to 1898. He conceived and implemented the idea of a streetcar-mounted collection box for the mail. It was later implemented in other cities in the country. The 2½-story frame Queen Anne structure features a gable-on-hip roof with intersecting gables, a brick foundation, wrap-around porch, and dormer windows. The house was individually listed on the National Register of Historic Places in 1998. It was included as a contributing property in the Polk County Homestead and Trust Company Addition Historic District in 2016.
