= Michael J. Keplinger =

Austrian musician and filmmaker

- Keplinger in 2022

Background information
- Also known as: MJK
- Born: November 10, 1999 (age 27); Linz, Austria
- Occupations: musician; filmmaker
- Label: DIEgital Records
- Website: michaeljkeplinger.com

Michael J. Keplinger (born November 10, 1999) is an Austrian musician and filmmaker.

== Biography ==
Keplinger's 2019 music video False Neon God premiered at Crossing Europe in 2020. In 2021, his music video for the independent single Pick Up Your Cross (and follow me) was awarded The "Levi" Award for The Best Music Video at the Ca’ Foscari Short Film Festival.

Keplinger's first narrative short films Allerseelen and Iris premiered at the Crossing Europe Film Festival in 2022 and 2024 respectively. The films received several awards. For his films, Keplinger serves as director, producer, composer, screenwriter, Film editor and sound designer.

In 2024, Keplinger signed with Upper Austrian record label Diegital Records. His debut single Passing Through was released later that year accompanied by a music video shot on 16 mm film. In 2026, Keplinger released the EP The Words at Play. For his music, Keplinger writes, produces and performs all vocal and instrumental parts himself.

== Discography ==
EPs

- Passing Through EP (2025)
- The Words at Play (2026)

Singles

- Passing Through (2024)
- More Than Kind (2024)
- The Words at Play (2026)
- Ember (2026)

== Filmography ==
Only directorial efforts are listed below.

Short films

- Allerseelen (2021)
- Iris (2024)
- The Words at Play: Visual EP (2026)

Music videos

- False Neon God (2019)
- Pick Up Your Cross (and follow me) (2020)
- Honolulu, Baby! (2020)
- Impromptu Sessions (2021–2023)
- Passing Through (2024)
- The Words at Play (2026)
- Rêverie To Zoë (2026)
- Ember (2026)
- S8/Underground (2026)
- The Words at Play Reprise (2026)

== Accolades ==
Year		Award/Category	Work	Status
2021	Ca’ Foscari Short Film Festival	The "Levi" Award for The Best Music Video	Pick Up Your Cross (and follow me)	Won
2021	Golden Wire	Short Film	Allerseelen	Nominated
2022	Landesmeisterschaft für Oberösterreich und Salzburg	Gold medal	Pick Up Your Cross (and follow me)	Won
2022	Landesmeisterschaft für Oberösterreich und Salzburg	Special award for a remarkable idea	Pick Up Your Cross (and follow me)	Won
2022	Festival der österreichischen Filmautoren	Bronze medal	Pick Up Your Cross (and follow me)	Won
2022	Flatness Film Awards	Best Super Short Experimental	Allerseelen	Won
2022	Austrian Filmfestival	Best Horror/Thriller Film	Allerseelen	Won
2023	Festival der Film-Autoren von Oberösterreich und Salzburg	Gold medal	Allerseelen	Won
2023	Festival der Film-Autoren von Oberösterreich und Salzburg	Special award for a remarkable idea (with Simona Ascher)	Allerseelen	Won
2023	Festival der österreichischen Filmautoren	silver medal	Allerseelen	Won
2023	Festival der österreichischen Filmautoren	Special award for remarkable sound design	Allerseelen	Nominated
2023	Festival der österreichischen Filmautoren	Special award for remarkable picture design (with Niklas Strahammer)	Allerseelen	Nominated
2023	Festival der österreichischen Filmautoren	Special award for remarkable narrative	Allerseelen	Nominated
2023	Golden Wire	Sound and Music	Passing Through	Won
2024	Festival der Film-Autoren	Provincial champion for Upper Austria	Iris	Won
2024	Festival der Film-Autoren	Gold medal	Iris	Won
2024	Festival der Film-Autoren	Special award for remarkable direction	Iris	Won
2024	Festival der Film-Autoren	Special award for remarkable sound design	Iris	Won
2024	Festival der Film-Autoren	Special award for remarkable picture design (with Niklas Strahammer)	Iris	Won
2024	Festival der Österreichischen Film-Autoren	Silver medal	Iris	Won
2024	Zawinul Foundation For Achievement	Creative Video Award	Iris	Won
2024	Austrian Filmfestival	Best Horror 2024	Iris	Won
2024	Austrian Filmfestival	Best Film	Iris	Nominated
2025	TimeLine Film Festival	Intercultural and Integration Award	Iris	Won
2025	Buntingford Shorts Film Festival	Horror category	Iris	Won
2025	85th Film Competition between Nations and Congress	Silber medal	Iris	Won
