= Thomas A. Davis =

19/20th-century American soldier

- Born: June 29, 1873; Virginia, United States
- Died: February 12, 1964 (aged 90)
- Military career
- Allegiance: United States of America
- Branch: Army
- Rank: Colonel
- Commands: 6th US Volunteer Infantry
- Conflicts: Spanish–American War: Puerto Rico Campaign

Colonel Thomas Alderson Davis (June 29, 1873 – February 12, 1964) was the founder of two military schools in the United States.

== Early life and education ==
Davis was born in Virginia and graduated from the University of Tennessee. Shortly after college he joined his father in the shoe business.

== Military career ==
During the Spanish–American War he served as a captain of the 6th US Volunteer Infantry, also known as the Sixth Immunes, which was mustered at Knoxville, Tennessee, and saw service in Puerto Rico.

=== Military academies ===
In 1907 he founded the El Paso Military Academy in Texas. On November 23, 1910, he opened his second academy in Pacific Beach, California, the San Diego Army and Navy Academy. In 1921 he became officially known as colonel.
