= Vittorio Scarpati =

Italian artist and cartoonist

Vittorio Scarpati (1953–1989) was an Italian artist and cartoonist best known for his highly-expressive works created during his battle with AIDS. Scarpati was noted for his long black curly hair and having a classic Neapolitan profile. Scarpati’s drawings have been exhibited throughout the world, including at 56 Bleeker Gallery, New York and Studio Voltaire in London.

== Work ==
Born in Naples, Italy, Scarpati studied at the Academy of Fine Arts in Naples and pursued a career as a cartoonist and illustrator. He moved to New York City in the 1980s, where he continued to develop his art. Scarpati worked in various fields over the course of his career, including: jewelry design, architectural design, commercial animation, pen-and-ink drawing and marble restoration.

== Personal life ==
Scarpati was registered as a legal drug addict in Naples, Italy, making visits to hospital to collect morphine. Scarpati was married to artist and writer Cookie Mueller, whom he met in Positano, Italy in 1982. Mueller was another prominent figure in the New York art scene. Both Scarpati and Mueller were deeply affected by the AIDS epidemic, with Scarpati being diagnosed with the disease in the late 1980s.

== Illness, deathbed works and death ==
It was initially thought that Scarpati’s collapsed lungs were due to prolonged inhalation of marble dust, but he was soon found to be living with AIDS and as a result had pneumocystis pneumonia which affected his lungs - it is noted that the theme of heart and lungs is present in many of his deathbed works.

During his illness and time in hospital, Scarpati created a series of drawings - over 300- which documented his experience with AIDS. These drawings were later compiled into a book titled Putti's Pudding: Cookie Mueller and Vittorio Scarpati, which was published posthumously. Scarpati's work is celebrated for its raw emotional honesty and its reflection of the impact of AIDS on individuals and the art community. He died at a New York City hospital in September 1989. followed shortly by Mueller in November 1989. Their legacy continues to influence and inspire discussions around art, illness, and the human condition.

There are limited photos of Scarpati - one particularly poignant image (taken by Philip-Lorca di Corcia) - is of Scarpati on his birthday in his hospital bed surrounded by balloons. 50 people attended the celebration, challenging hospital rules. Another personal shot is of Mueller standing in front of Scarpati’s open casket during his funeral.

Writing about Scarpati, Mueller noted, ‘…I was amazed at his ease with pen and ink, brush and colour…images he drew flowed out of him effortlessly. While many artists struggle with their work, Vittorio didn’t. It was as if he had already planned every stroke, every detail, long before it was committed to paper. He was so fast. Also, his ‘cartoons’ weren’t empty; they always delivered subtle messages or wisdom.’
