= Army and Navy Academy =

Coordinates: 33°09′44″N 117°21′18″W

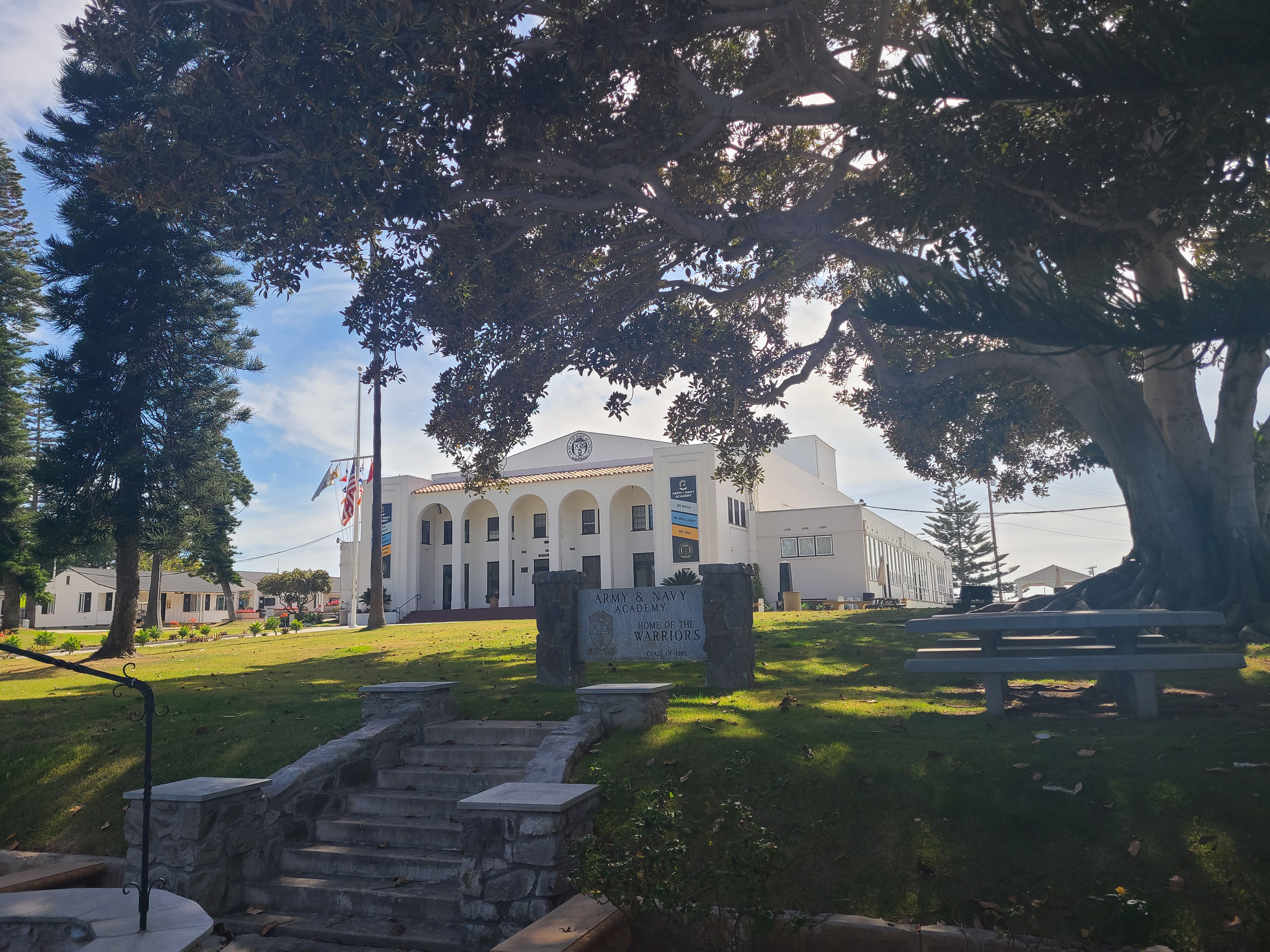
- Army and Navy Academy in 2021

Location
- 2605 Carlsbad Blvd; Carlsbad, California 92008; United States

Information
- Type: Private; Boarding; Day; College Preparatory; Military school
- Motto: Pro Deo et Pro Patria (For God and for Country)
- Established: 23 November 1910
- President: Barry Shreiar
- Faculty: 35
- Grades: 7–12
- Enrollment: 285
- Campus size: 15.1 acres
- Campus type: beachfront
- Colors: Black and Gold
- Team name: Warriors
- Website: www.armyandnavyacademy.org

Army and Navy Academy is a private college-preparatory military boarding school for boys in Carlsbad, California. Founded in 1910, the academy admits boys in grades 7 through 12.

== History ==
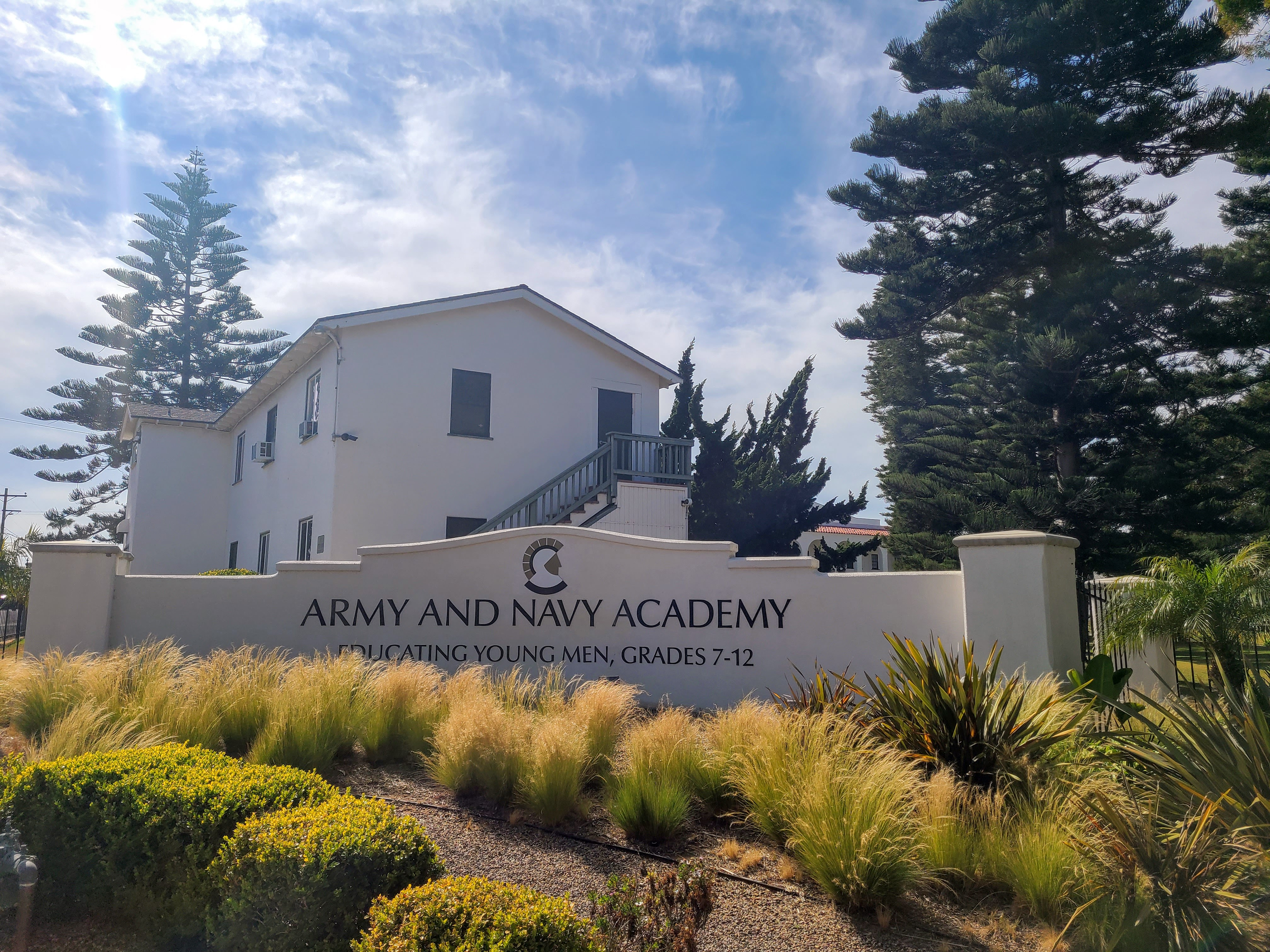
Army and Navy Academy in 2021

The academy was founded by Colonel Thomas A. Davis as the San Diego Army and Navy Academy on November 23, 1910. It was originally located in the Pacific Beach neighborhood of San Diego, California. In 1936, the academy moved to Carlsbad, California and opened as the Davis Military Academy, but a year later was again renamed the San Diego Army and Navy Academy. In 1944, "San Diego" was dropped from the name. Army and Navy Academy was notably led by William Currier Atkinson, who served as the academy's president for fifty years.

== Organization ==
The academy is governed by a board of trustees composed of philanthropists, alumni, and current and past parents. The school's academic program is managed by the Dean of Academics and its Junior Reserve Officers' Training Corps (JROTC) program is administered by the Senior Army Instructor.

Academically, the school is organized into a middle school (grades 7 & 8) and a high school (grades 9–12). Its high school academic program conforms to a college preparatory curriculum that follows the University of California A-G requirements for graduation. The academy's instructional philosophy is built around a single-gender educational model targeted toward the educational needs of boys.

Outside of classes, cadets are guided by TAC (trainer, advisor, coach) Officers. TAC Officers are responsible for mentoring and educating cadets in the afternoons and evenings, and serve as residential life officers in the academy's seven residential halls. Each TAC Officer oversees a company in the school's Army-style battalion. Cadets are assigned to roommates based on shared interests. Most rooms on campus are occupied by two cadets, but some larger dormitories feature three-occupant rooms.

The academy participates in California Interscholastic Federation sports and has competitive teams that include surf, wrestling, golf, football, lacrosse, swim, track and field, basketball, and baseball.

== Notable programs ==
All cadets participate in JROTC leadership courses in addition to their normal academic class schedule. The JROTC program consists of four levels of Leadership Education Training (LET) instruction. Cadets earn rank based on their academic and disciplinary performance, as well as regular assessments through the JROTC program. Top cadet leadership positions are determined through the Officer Candidate Course (OCC), an overnight excursion involving a variety of physical and mental challenges for prospective leaders. After OCC has ended, a selection committee meets to decide who best fits each position. Committee members include the academy's president, Senior Army Instructor, Commandant of Cadets, JROTC instructors, faculty leaders, and academic counselors.

New students enter as "plebes" and have no rank. New cadets are expected to undergo basic training on Academy history and professional knowledge, and must additionally complete several their first parade and military review, before becoming a full member of the Corps of Cadets.

Army and Navy Academy's drill team is nationally recognized as one of the best high school drill teams in the United States.

== Accreditations and affiliations ==
Army and Navy Academy is accredited by the Western Association of Schools and Colleges (WASC) and the California Association of Independent Schools (CAIS).

It is also a member of the Western Boarding Schools Association, The Association of Boarding Schools, the Association of Military Colleges and Schools of the United States, and the National Association of Independent Schools.

== Notable people ==
- William W. Crouch, U.S. Army general
- William C. Kuebler, civil liberties and human rights lawyer
- Marc McClure, actor
- Victor Villaseñor, writer
- Brandon Salgado -Tellis, actor
- Matt Hensley, musician and professional skateboarder
