= Claude Rodier =

French Resistance fighter, physicist and teacher

- Born: 21 July 1903; Saint-Éloy-les-Mines, Puy-de-Dôme, France
- Died: 10 November 1944 (aged 41); Ravensbrück camp, Germany
- Other name: Claude Virlogeux
- Spouse: Pierre Virlogeux
- Children: Jean and Marc Virlogeux
- Military career
- Allegiance: Free France
- Branch: MUR of Auvergne
- Rank: Staff Sergeant

Claude Rodier (21 July 1903 – 10 November 1944) was a physicist, teacher and staff sergeant in the Mouvements Unis de la Résistance (MUR), part of the French Resistance in Auvergne, France.

== Biography ==
=== Origins and education ===
Claude Rodier was born on 21 July 1903 in Saint-Éloy-les-Mines (Puy-de-Dôme) to a family of secular, republican teachers. Her ancestors were miners, and one of her grandfathers died in a mining accident in the Combrailles region.

Rodier enrolled into the École normale supérieure de jeunes filles in Sèvres in 1921, where she took several courses taught by the physicist and antifascist Paul Langevin. She was one of the youngest students at the time to hold the agrégé degree — the highest in France — in physics.

=== Before the Second World War ===
After having taught for some time at Pamiers, she relocated to Riom where she became a teacher at a secondary school for girls. On 28 August 1926, Rodier married Pierre Virlogeux, a young ceramic engineer in Clermont-Ferrand. The couple had two sons, Jean (1927–2006) and Marc (1934–2008). In 1929, she and her husband started a ceramics business called Les Grès Flammés" (transl. Fired Stoneware) where she put to work her expertise in physics and chemistry.

=== During the Second World War ===
In 1939, United States embassy officials approached Rodier because of her background in atomic physics and offered her to immigrate to the USA. Confident in the future of France and concerned with the family business and her young children, she did not accept this offer. In 1940, after the available workforce diminished due to the large numbers of war prisoners detained in Germany, Rodier returned to teaching at the girls' school in Riom.

==== Arrest ====
Claude Rodier was arrested on 8 February 1944 with her husband, her two sons, and Pierre's father. Marc and his grandfather were released the same day. Rodier was held at the military prison of the 92nd Regiment of the French Infantry with the wife of General André Marteau and Marie Pfister, grandmother of the writer Patrick Raynal. Rodier and Pfister were deported to the women's concentration camp in northern Germany, Ravensbrück by transport departing from Paris-Romainville on 13 May 1944. (Their ID numbers were 39037 and 38971, respectively). Marie Pfister would remain with Rodier until her death.

==== Deportation ====
After Rodier arrived at the camp, another captive who had come separately from the 92nd Regiment told her of the suicide of her husband on the night of her arrest. He died at the Anthéroche barracks in Riom.

Claude Rodier remained at Ravensbrück for several weeks. Also present were Geneviève de Gaulle-Anthonioz, Odette Sansom, Margarete Buber-Neumann, and Germaine Tillion. The Nazis expected Rodier to participate as an atomic physicist in the German nuclear weapons program. After her refusal, she was condemned to unloading coal barges on the German lake, Schwedtsee, where she contracted pleurisy, from which she died on 10 November 1944.

== Posthumous Recognition ==
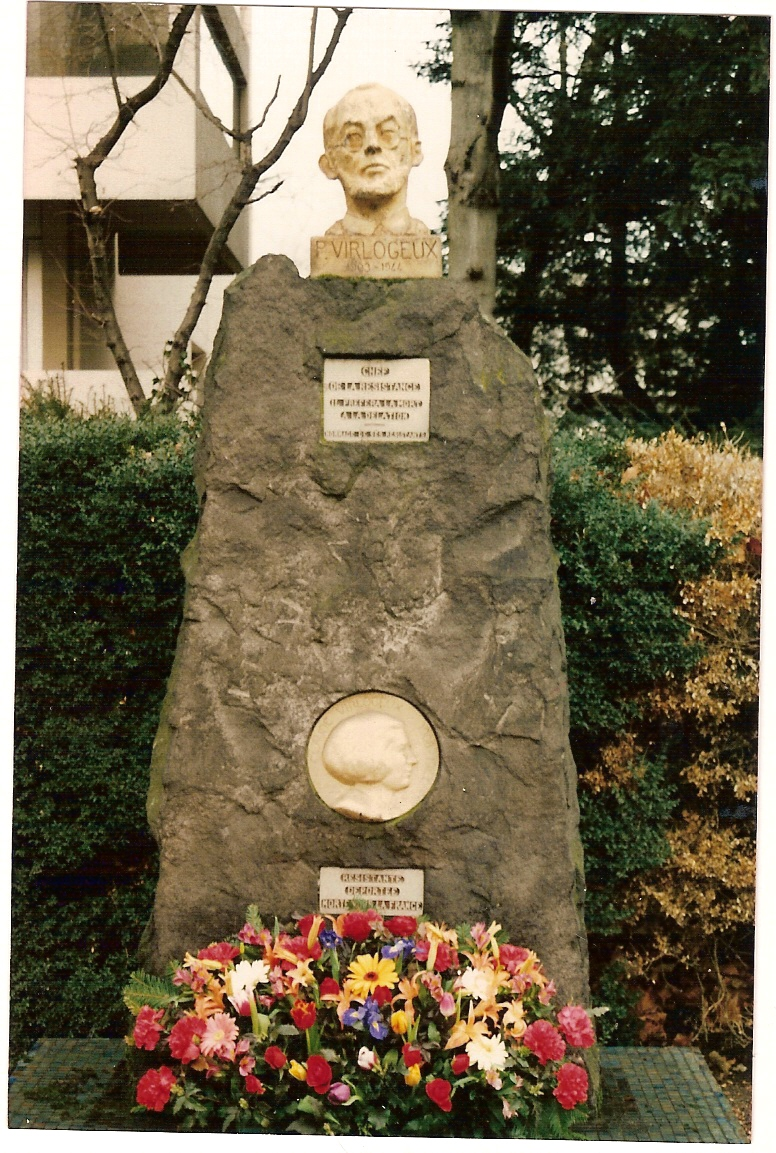
Monument to Pierre Virlogeux and Claude Rodier

After the war, the municipality of Riom changed the name of Riom-Châtelguyon avenue, which led from the city center to the SNCF train station, to avenue Virlogeux. On this avenue, a monument to Rodier and Virlogeux was erected. Upon a base of ceramic tile rests a slab of stone cut in the form of a menhir, containing a portrait of Claude Rodier in profile and topped with a bust of Pierre Virlogeux, both portraits being made by Virlogeux himself.

The 19th century park along this avenue was also renamed square Virlogeux in their honor.

The public high school of Riom, constructed on the site of the Anthéroche barracks where Pierre Virlogeux committed suicide and where his body was hidden by the SS of Clermont-Ferrand, was named lycée Pierre-et-Claude-Virlogeux.

== Family ==
- Jean Virlogeux (1927–2006)

In 1940, as a French Scout, Jean participated in welcoming refugees into Riom. In 1943, he attempted, with a comrade, to join the maquis. Under the authority of his father, he participated in the Resistance in several capacities, including as a messenger and a receiver of airdrops.

On the night of his arrest, 8 February 1944, Jean Virlogeux had just celebrated his seventeenth birthday. After his arrest, he was violently shaken, notably by Ursula Brandt. Transferred to the 92nd Regiment's barracks in Clermont-Ferrand, he began a journey which, as a deportee under the German Nacht und Nebel program, would take him to Compiègne-Royallieu (with a captivity in the Paris region to disarm bombs from the sorting station of La Chapelle), to the camp of Neuengamme, to the Kommando of Fallersleben, where he worked in Volkswagen factories as an electrical worker.

Upon returning from Germany, Geneviève de Gaulle-Anthonioz carried Claude Rodier's glasses and returned them to her parents, who still had not heard the fate of their grandson, Jean Virlogeux. He had been liberated on 2 May 1945 from the Wöbbelin concentration camp by the 82nd Airborne Division of the United States and was repatriated to France on 29 July 1945 after a stay at the hospital of Ludwigslust to treat typhus and advanced bone decalcification.

- Marc Virlogeux (1934–2008)

Marc was 10 years old when he was arrested with his brother, parents and grandfather. Their ages being taken into account, he and his grandfather were liberated on the evening of 8 February 1944 but he never saw his parents again. He remained ignorant of their fate until the liberation for his father, and the liberation of the concentration camps for his mother. He was profoundly affected by this for the rest of his life.
