= Dr. John B. and Anna M. Hatton House =

Historic house in Iowa, United States

- U.S. National Register of Historic Places
- U.S. Historic district – Contributing property
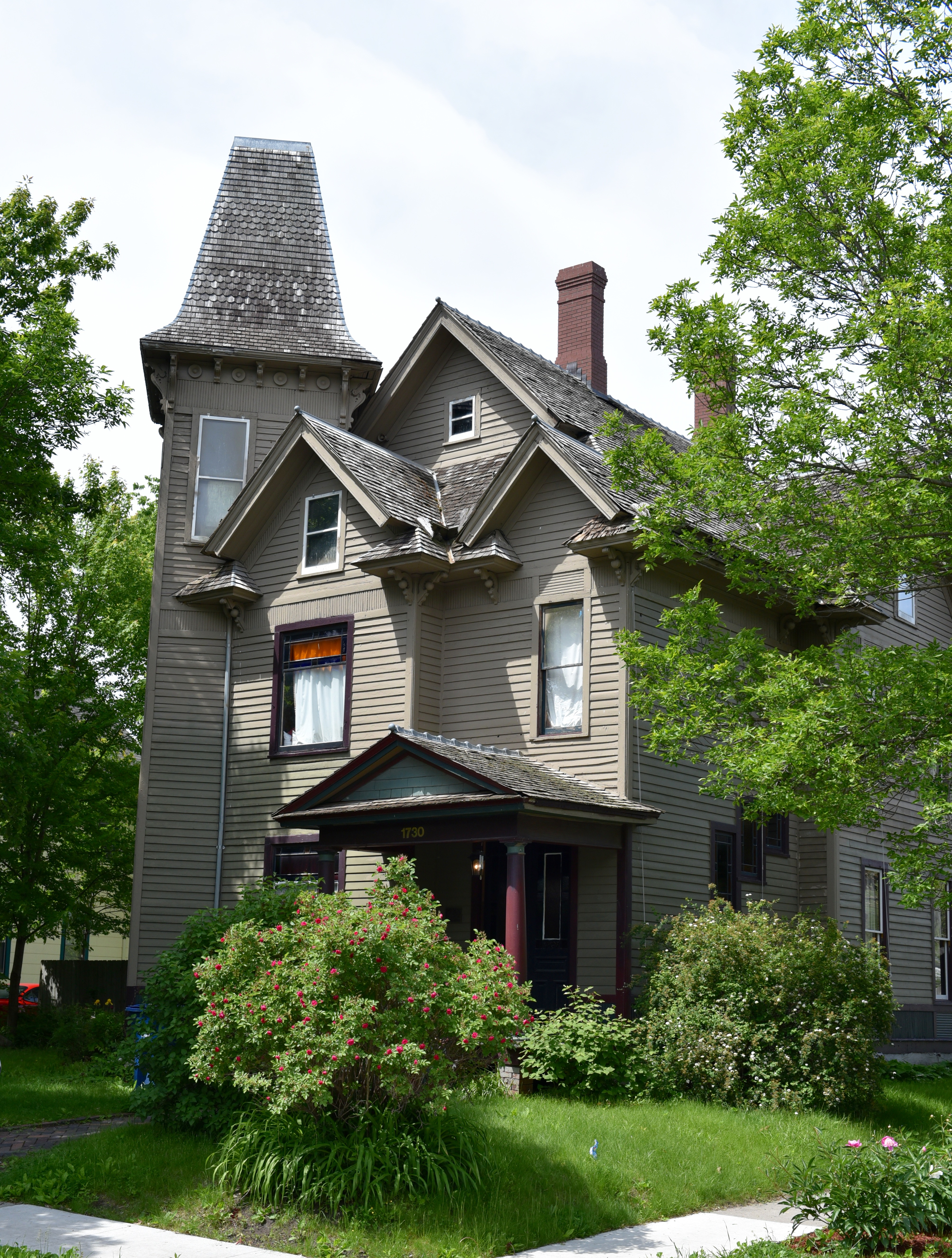

- Location within Iowa Location within the United States
- Location: 1730 7th St. Des Moines, Iowa
- Coordinates: 41°36′36.1″N 93°37′38.2″W
- Area: less than one acre
- Built: 1887
- Architectural style: Stick/Eastlake
- Part of: Polk County Homestead and Trust Company Addition Historic District (ID16000687)
- MPS: Towards a Greater Des Moines MPS
- NRHP reference No.: 98000408
- Added to NRHP: April 23, 1998

The Dr. John B. and Anna M. Hatton House is a historic building located in Des Moines, Iowa, United States. The house is significant for its suburban architecture in the former suburb of North Des Moines, especially the canted bay subtype of the Stick Style with Italianate influence. This 2½-story frame structure on a brick foundation features a hip roof with intersecting gables, a canted bay tower on the southeast corner, porches on the front and side, and a two-story bay window on the south elevation. The house was individually listed on the National Register of Historic Places in 1998. It was included as a contributing property in the Polk County Homestead and Trust Company Addition Historic District in 2016.
