= Cookie Mueller =

American actress and writer (1949–1989)

- Cookie Mueller, 1981
- Born: Dorothy Karen Mueller; March 2, 1949; Baltimore, Maryland, U.S.
- Died: November 10, 1989 (aged 40); New York City, U.S.
- Occupations: Actress; writer
- Years active: 1969–1989
- Spouse: Vittorio Scarpati (m. 1986; died 1989)
- Partner: Sharon Niesp (1973–1981)

Dorothy Karen "Cookie" Mueller (March 2, 1949 – November 10, 1989) was an American actress, writer, and Dreamlander who starred in many of John Waters' early films, including Multiple Maniacs (1970), Pink Flamingos (1972), Female Trouble (1974), and Desperate Living (1977).

== Early life ==
Cookie Mueller grew up with her parents Frank Lennert Mueller (d. 1984) and Anne (Sawyer) Mueller (d. 1995, aged 82) in the Baltimore suburbs in a house near the woods, a mental hospital and railroad tracks. She was nicknamed Cookie as a baby: "Somehow I got the name Cookie before I could walk. It didn't matter to me, they could call me whatever they wanted." During her childhood Cookie, along with her parents, brother Michael, and sister Judy, took road trips across the country:

In 1959, with eyes the same size, I got to see some of America traveling in the old green Plymouth with my parents, who couldn't stand each other, and my brother and sister, who loved everyone. [Cookie's brother Michael actually died in an accident on March 20, 1955.] I remember the Erie Canal on a dismal day, the Maine coastline in a storm, Georgia willow trees in the rain, and the Luray Caverns in the Blue Ridge Mountains of Virginia where the stalagmites and -tites were poorly lit.

Mueller had many pets as a child, including many turtles (one named Fidel), a dog named Jip, snakes, and tadpoles. Cookie began to write at age 11, when she wrote a 321-page book about the Johnstown flood of 1889. She stapled it together, wrapped it in butcher paper and Saran wrap, and placed it on the shelves of a local library in what would have been its proper place. The book was never seen again.

With a swath of pivotal events in Mueller's life—including her brother's death at age 14, the result of climbing a dead tree, which collapsed on him in the woods near their home—she pursued writing, and in high school hung out with the hippie crowd. One of Mueller's idiosyncrasies as a teen was that she constantly dyed her hair: "'Whenever you're depressed, just change your hair color,' she [her mother] always told me, years later, when I was a teenager: I was never denied a bottle of hair bleach or dye. In my closet there weren't many clothes, but there were tons of bottles."

Mueller took a job at a Baltimore men's department store and saved enough funds to head to Haight-Ashbury, where she continued the hippie lifestyle. Mueller traveled across the country, living with groups of vagrants, and settled in places such as Provincetown, Massachusetts; British Columbia; San Francisco; Pennsylvania; Jamaica; and Sicily.

== Career ==
=== Film ===
In 1969, Mueller first met film director John Waters at the Baltimore premiere of his film Mondo Trasho. Mueller subsequently starred in Waters's films, including a major role as Cookie the Spy in Pink Flamingos. She and Sharon Niesp, another Dreamlander, were lovers. In his book Shock Value, John Waters credits Mueller with the title for his 1974 film Female Trouble. When she was hospitalized for pelvic inflammatory disease in Provincetown, Waters and Mink Stole visited Mueller. "What happened, Cook?" Waters asked. "Just a little female trouble, hon," she replied.

In addition to her films with John Waters, Mueller appeared in a number of underground films, including Final Reward, Underground U.S.A., and Susan Seidelman's debut feature, Smithereens, where Mueller played the victim in a horror movie excerpt. In the late 70s, Mueller moved to New York and became a writer, journalist, and columnist.

=== Author ===
Mueller wrote the health column "Ask Dr. Mueller" for the East Village Eye and later served as art critic for Details. Mueller's books, How to Get Rid Of Pimples (with photos by David Armstrong, Nan Goldin, Peter Hujar) (1984, Top Stories #19-20); Ask Doctor Mueller (1996), a collection of her writings; Walking Through Clear Water in a Pool Painted Black (1990), a memoir; and Garden of Ashes (Hanuman Books, 1990) are cult classics. Other works include the novella Fan Mail, Frank Letters, and Crank Calls (Hanuman Books, 1988) and several collections of short prose. Mueller wrote the introduction to her husband Vittorio Scarpati's book, Putti's Pudding, which collected drawings he made while dying of AIDS-related pneumonia.

== Personal life ==
Mueller was in a relationship with Sharon Niesp, an actress, singer and Provincetown fixture. She later married the Italian artist Vittorio Scarpati, who died of AIDS in September 1989.

== Death and legacy ==
Mueller died from AIDS-related pneumonia on November 10, 1989, at Cabrini Medical Center in New York City, aged 40. Her memorial was held at the Poetry Project at St. Mark's Church in-the-Bowery on November 15, 1989. Her ashes are interred in multiple locations: on the beach near Provincetown; in the flowerbed of the Church of St. Luke in the Fields in Greenwich Village; alongside those of Vittorio and her dog Beauty in the Scarpati family crypt in Sorrento, Italy; under the statue of Christ the Redeemer atop Corcovado in Rio de Janeiro; in the South Bronx; and in the holy waters of the Ganges River. She was survived by her son, Max Wolfe Mueller, who appeared in Pink Flamingos.

The last of Mueller's quotes, an elegy of her intent and existence, was written shortly before her death:

Fortunately I am not the first person to tell you that you will never die. You simply lose your body. You will be the same except you won't have to worry about rent or mortgages or fashionable clothes. You will be released from sexual obsessions. You will not have drug addictions. You will not need alcohol. You will not have to worry about cellulite or cigarettes or cancer or AIDS or venereal disease. You will be free.

Nan Goldin created and widely exhibited The Cookie Portfolio 1976–1989, a series of 15 portraits, after Mueller's death. One photograph, "Cookie and Vittorio's Wedding" (1986), documents Mueller's wedding to Vittorio Scarpati, an Italian artist and jewelry designer from Naples who died of AIDS just seven weeks before Mueller. Another of Goldin's photographs, "Cookie at Vittorio's Casket, NYC, September 1989," was called a "magnificent portrait ... a great image. Devastating but great," by the San Francisco Examiner's art critic David Bonetti. Edgewise: A Picture of Cookie Mueller, an oral history of Mueller's life, was published in 2014. She is one of many commemorated in the AIDS Quilt.

== Bibliography ==
- Mueller, Cookie (1984). How to Get Rid of Pimples. New York: Top Stories. ISBN 0-917061-19-5.
- Mueller, Cookie (1988). Fan Mail, Frank Letters, and Crank Calls. New York: Hanuman Books. ISBN 0-937815-14-4.
- Mueller, Cookie; Scarpati, Vittorio (1989). Putti's Pudding. Kyoto: Kyoto Shoin. ISBN 4763685449.
- Mueller, Cookie (1990). Walking Through Clear Water in a Pool Painted Black (2022: Collected Stories, expanded ed.). New York: Semiotext(e). ISBN 0-936756-61-6.
- Mueller, Cookie (1990). Garden of Ashes. New York: Hanuman Books. ISBN 0-937815-36-5.
- Mueller, Cookie (1997). Scholder, Amy (ed.). Ask Dr. Mueller: The Writings of Cookie Mueller. New York: Serpent's Tail High Risk Books. ISBN 1-85242-331-5.

== Filmography ==
Year	Title	Role	Notes
1970	Multiple Maniacs	Cookie Divine / Cavalcade patron / Jesus follower	
1972	Pink Flamingos	Cookie	
1974	Female Trouble	Concetta	
1977	Desperate Living	Flipper	
1978	Final Reward	Veronica	
1979	Seduction of Patrick		Short
1980	Underground U.S.A.	Betty (a barmaid)	
1981	Subway Riders	Penelope Trasher	
1981	Polyester	Betty Lalinski	
1982	Smithereens	Karen, in horror movie sequence	
1982	Tempest	New Year's Eve Party Girl	
1983	Variety	Woman in bar	
2000	Downtown 81 (a.k.a. New York Beat Movie)	Second go-go dancer	(final film role)
