= Jason Dunham =

United States Marine Corps Medal of Honor recipient (1981–2004)

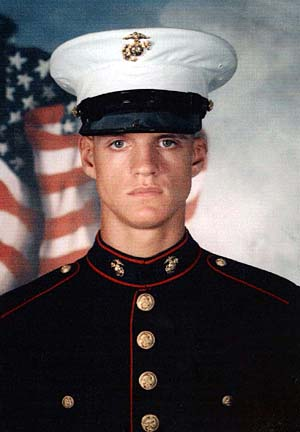
- Dunham in 2000, during recruit training.
- Born: November 10, 1981; Scio, New York, U.S.
- Died: April 22, 2004 (aged 22); Bethesda, Maryland, U.S.
- Burial place: Fairlawn Cemetery; Scio, New York
- Military career
- Allegiance: United States
- Branch: United States Marine Corps
- Service years: 2000–2004
- Rank: Corporal
- Nickname: Uno (English: "One")
- Units: Marine Corps Security Force Battalion; 3rd Battalion, 7th Marines
- Conflicts: Iraq War
- Awards: Medal of Honor; Purple Heart

Jason Lee Dunham (November 10, 1981 – April 22, 2004) was a corporal in the United States Marine Corps who was posthumously awarded the Medal of Honor for his actions while serving with 3rd Battalion 7th Marines during the Iraq War. While on a patrol in Husaybah, his unit was attacked. In the course of the fighting, Dunham deliberately used his helmet and body to cover a live grenade and save nearby Marines. When it exploded Dunham was gravely injured and died eight days later.

== Early life and education ==
Jason Dunham was born on November 10, 1981, in Scio, New York, and resided there with his parents, Dan and Deb, and his three siblings, two brothers and a sister. He graduated from Scio High School in 2000, having played basketball for his high school team.

== Military service ==
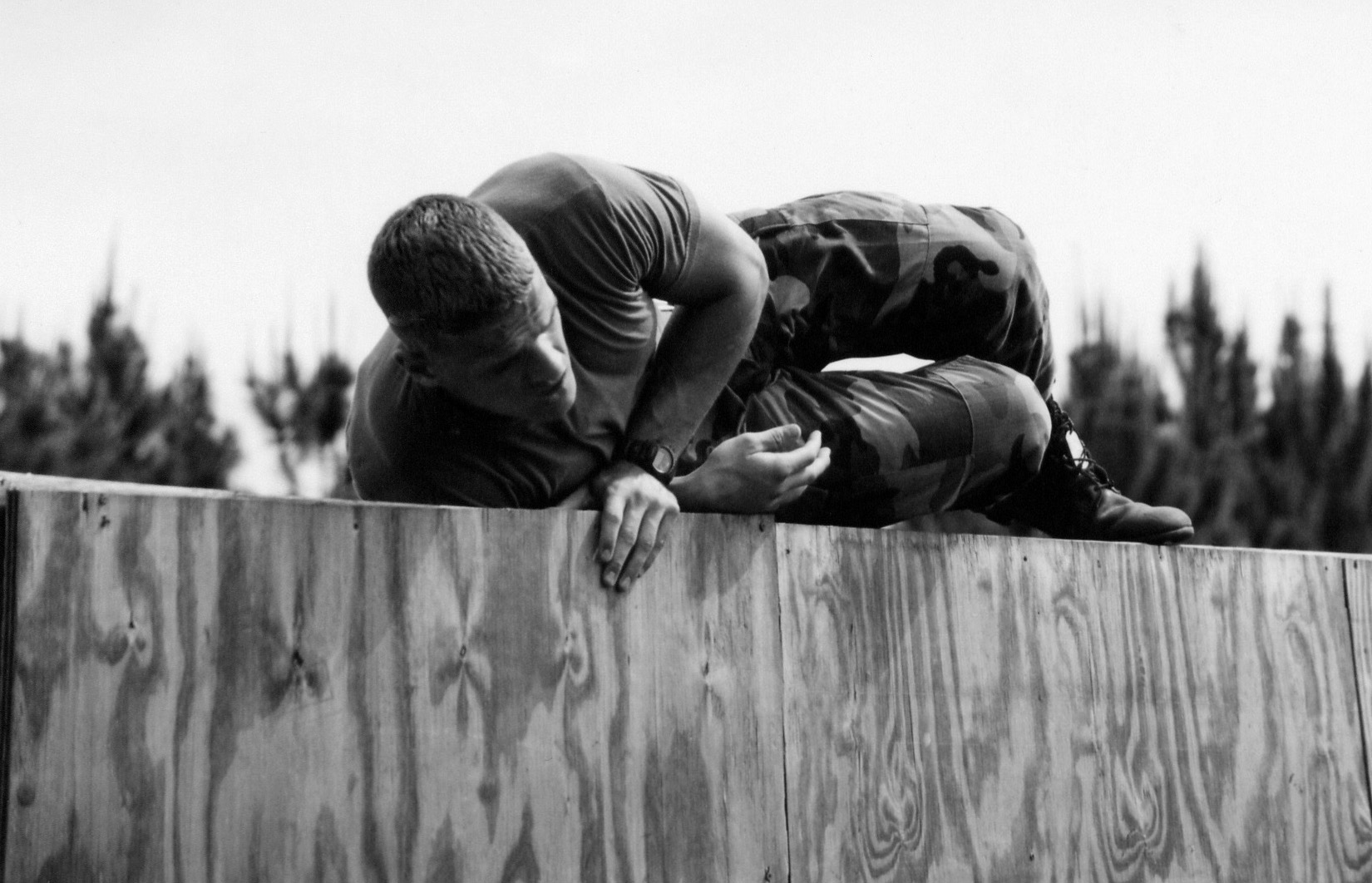
Dunham scales a wall during training in 2000

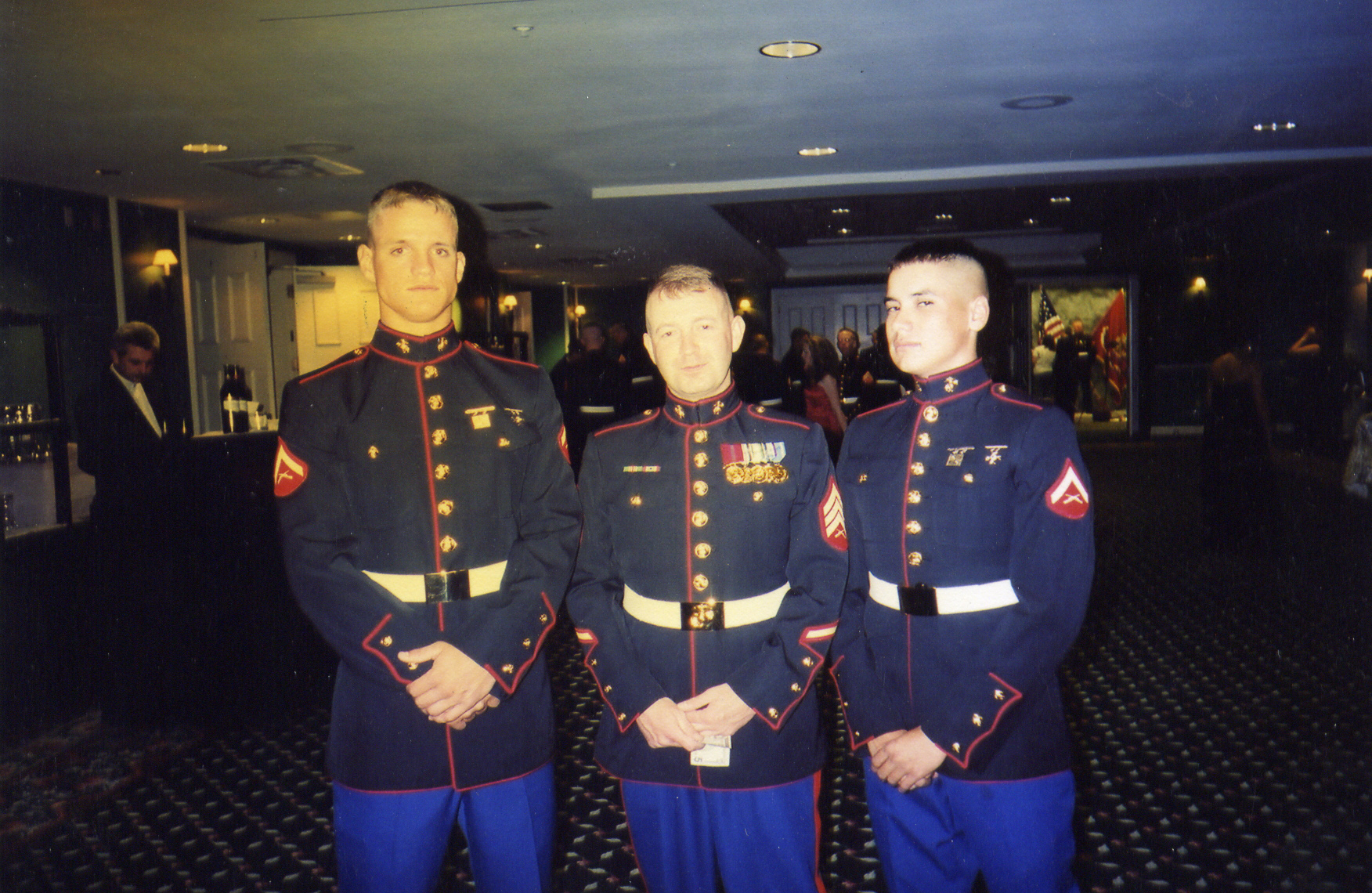
Dunham with other Marines.

Dunham joined the United States Marine Corps in 2000. After graduating from recruit training on October 27 from Golf Company Platoon 2092, he served as a Security Force sentry at Naval Submarine Base Kings Bay in Georgia until 2003.

In early 2004, Dunham was serving as a squad leader with 4th Platoon, Company K, 3rd Battalion, 7th Marine Regiment, 1st Marine Division, I Marine Expeditionary Force. His unit was based in Al-Karābilah.

On April 14, 2004, the battalion commander's convoy came under attack near Husaybah, Iraq, and 4th Platoon was dispatched on patrol to investigate. Dunham and his squad intercepted a number of cars spotted near the scene of the attack, which the patrol detained to search for weapons. When the squad approached a white Toyota Land Cruiser and discovered AK-47s, the driver exited and attacked the Marines in an attempt to flee. Dunham responded by closing in for hand-to-hand combat to subdue him. During the fighting, the individual dropped an armed Mills 36M hand grenade.

To save the rest of his men, Dunham deliberately threw himself on the grenade, attempting to use his PASGT helmet to shield himself and others from the explosion, warning the others to "watch his hands." Dunham, the insurgent, and two other Marines nearby were all wounded by grenade fragments.

Dunham was severely wounded by the grenade blast, and was immediately evacuated. Within days, he arrived at National Naval Medical Center in Bethesda, Maryland, in a coma, where he was being treated for his injuries. After being diagnosed with brain damage and deemed unlikely to recover, he was taken off life support eight days later, on April 22, 2004. Shortly beforehand, Commandant of the Marine Corps, General Michael Hagee, presented Dunham with the Purple Heart. Dunham's parents were at his bedside when he died.

In 2004, Michael M. Phillips, staff writer for The Wall Street Journal, wrote an article summarizing Dunham's actions that appeared on page A1 of the May 25 edition. In 2005, Phillips published The Gift of Valor: A War Story, which told Dunham's life story.

== Honors and awards ==
In addition to the Medal of Honor and his other military decorations, Dunham has also received other honors:

- USS Jason Dunham (DDG-109)
- The United States Post Office in Scio, New York was renamed the Corporal Jason L. Dunham Post Office
- The Marine Corps Security Force Barracks at Naval Submarine Base Kings Bay Georgia was renamed the Corporal Jason Dunham Barracks
- Crucible warrior's station at both Marine Corps Recruit Depot Parris Island, South Carolina and at San Diego, California, are named in his honor
- The Marine Corps League Chapter in Palm Desert, California is named in his honor.
- The Cpl Dunham Room, Corporals Course, Marine Corps Air Station Beaufort, South Carolina.
- A chapter of the Leathernecks Motorcycle Club International is named in his honor.
- Dunham Hall is a Marine Corps dining facility named after Cpl Jason Dunham on Marine Corps Air Ground Combat Center in Twentynine Palms.

=== Military decorations ===
Dunham's awards include:

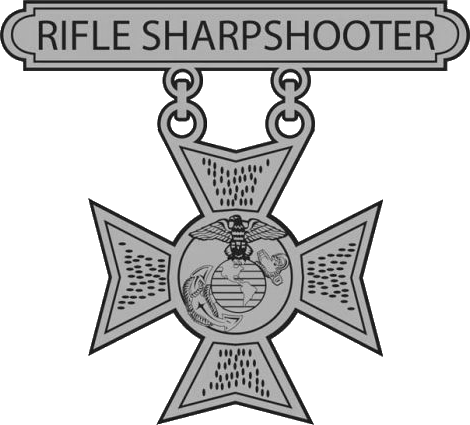

Medal of Honor	Purple Heart	Combat Action Ribbon
Navy Meritorious Unit Commendation	Marine Corps Good Conduct Medal	National Defense Service Medal
Iraq Campaign Medal w/ 1 campaign star	Global War on Terrorism Service Medal	Navy Sea Service Deployment Ribbon
Sharpshooter Rifle marksmanship badge		Expert Pistol marksmanship badge

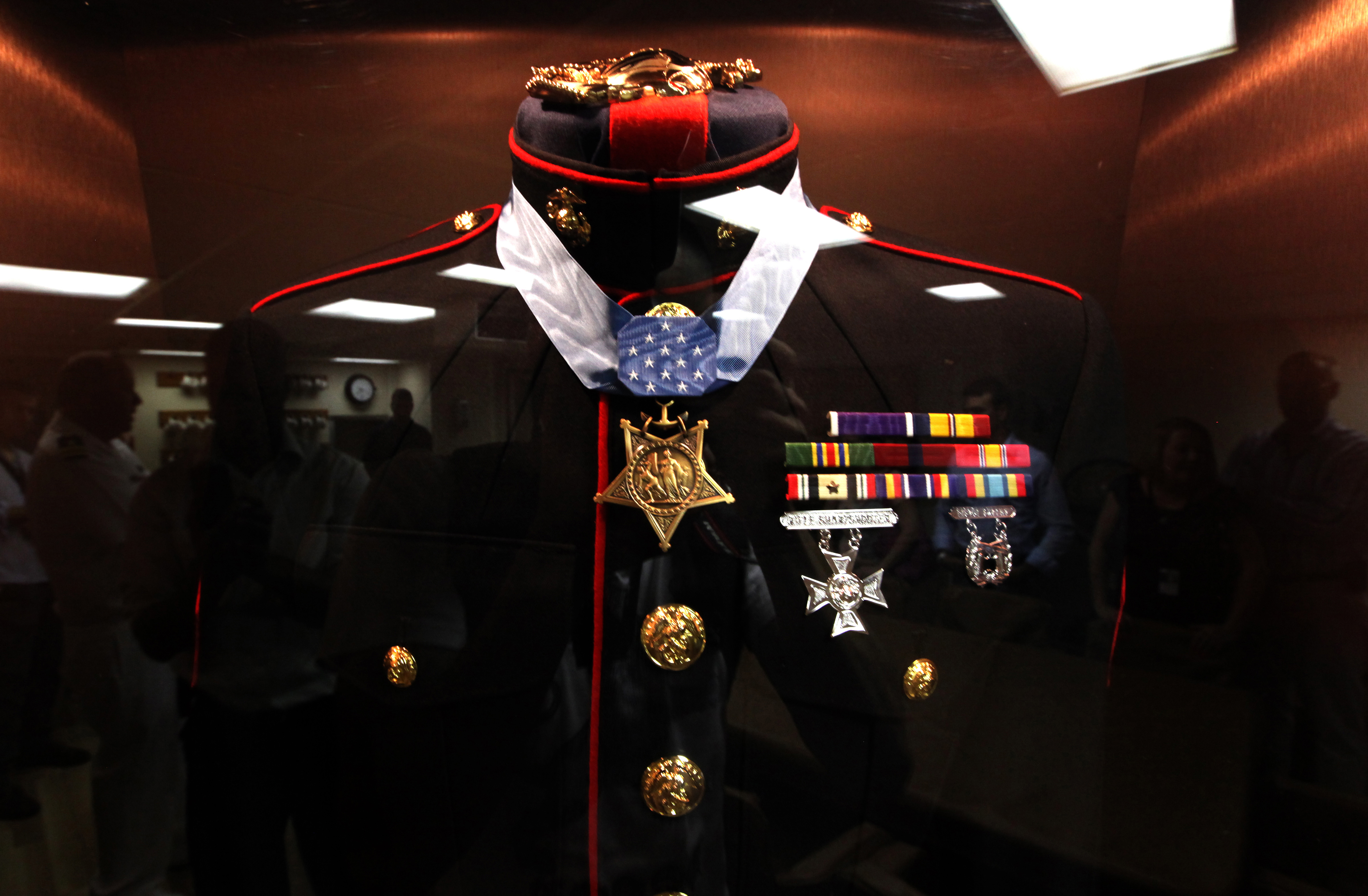
Dunham's uniform on display aboard USS Jason Dunham

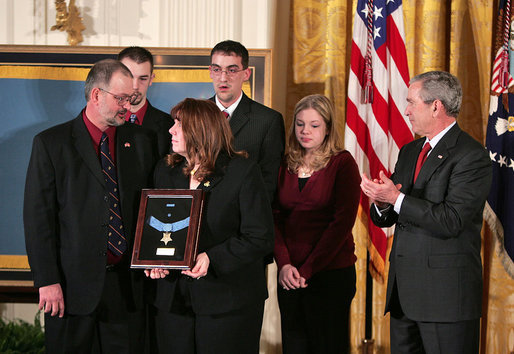
President George W. Bush presents the Medal of Honor to the family of Jason Dunham during a ceremony in the East Room on January 11, 2007

=== Medal of Honor ===
Shortly after his death, Lieutenant Colonel Matthew Lopez, Dunham's commanding officer, began the process of nominating him for the Medal of Honor, the United States' highest award for valor in combat. On November 10, 2006, at the dedication of the National Museum of the Marine Corps, President George W. Bush announced that Corporal Dunham would receive the Medal of Honor, making him the second recipient of the Medal of Honor for actions in the Iraq War and the first Marine recipient for actions since the Vietnam War.

President Bush presented Dunham's family with the Medal of Honor in a ceremony in the East Room of the White House on January 11, 2007.

==== Citation ====
The President of the United States in the name of The Congress takes pride in presenting the Medal of Honor posthumously to

CORPORAL
JASON L. DUNHAM
UNITED STATES MARINE CORPS

For service as set forth in the following citation:

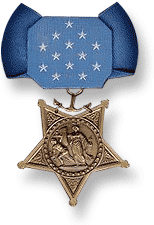

For conspicuous gallantry and intrepidity at the risk of his life above and beyond the call of duty while serving as Rifle Squad Leader, 4th Platoon, Company K, Third Battalion, Seventh Marines (Reinforced), Regimental Combat Team 7, First Marine Division (Reinforced), on 14 April 2004. Corporal Dunham's squad was conducting a reconnaissance mission in the town of Karabilah, Iraq, when they heard rocket-propelled grenade and small arms fire erupt approximately two kilometers to the west. Corporal Dunham led his Combined Anti-Armor Team towards the engagement to provide fire support to their Battalion Commander's convoy, which had been ambushed as it was traveling to Camp Husaybah. As Corporal Dunham and his Marines advanced, they quickly began to receive enemy fire. Corporal Dunham ordered his squad to dismount their vehicles and led one of his fire teams on foot several blocks south of the ambushed convoy. Discovering seven Iraqi vehicles in a column attempting to depart, Corporal Dunham and his team stopped the vehicles to search them for weapons. As they approached the vehicles, an insurgent leaped out and attacked Corporal Dunham. Corporal Dunham wrestled the insurgent to the ground and in the ensuing struggle saw the insurgent release a grenade. Corporal Dunham immediately alerted his fellow Marines to the threat. Aware of the imminent danger and without hesitation, Corporal Dunham covered the grenade with his helmet and body, bearing the brunt of the explosion and shielding his Marines from the blast. In an ultimate and selfless act of bravery in which he was mortally wounded, he saved the lives of at least two fellow Marines. By his undaunted courage, intrepid fighting spirit, and unwavering devotion to duty, Corporal Dunham gallantly gave his life for his country, thereby reflecting great credit upon himself and upholding the highest traditions of the Marine Corps and the United States Naval Service".

=== USS Jason Dunham ===
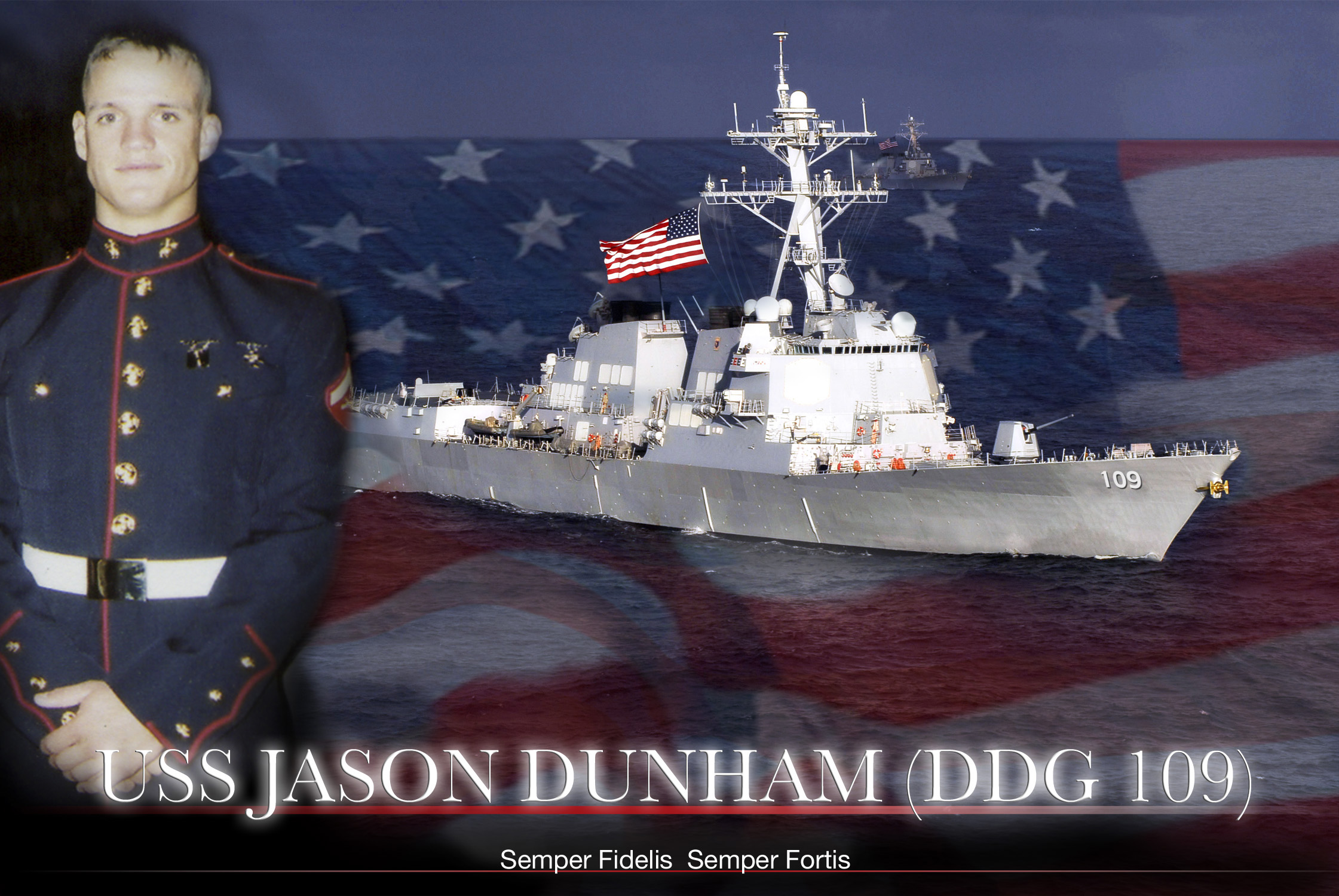
Artist's depiction of USS Jason Dunham

On March 20, 2007, the Navy reported that a new Arleigh Burke-class destroyer guided missile destroyer would be named USS Jason Dunham (DDG-109), in his honor. In a formal ceremony in Scio on March 23, 2007, Navy Secretary Donald C. Winter officially announced the naming of DDG-109 after Dunham. The keel was laid at a ceremony on April 11, 2008, at Bath Iron Works in Bath, Maine. The ship was christened on August 1, 2009, with Dunham's mother Debra acting as the ship's sponsor.

Among family members and officials present at the christening, also in attendance were Dunham's Kilo Company commander, Major Trent Gibson, as well as Sergeant Bill Hampton and Corporal Kelly Miller, whose lives he saved, and retired General Hagee. A piece of Dunham's helmet is encased in the mast. The Jason Dunham was commissioned on November 13, 2010. The ship's galley, named "Jason's Dugout", is decorated with memorabilia from Dunham's favorite baseball team, the New York Yankees.

=== Other namesakes ===
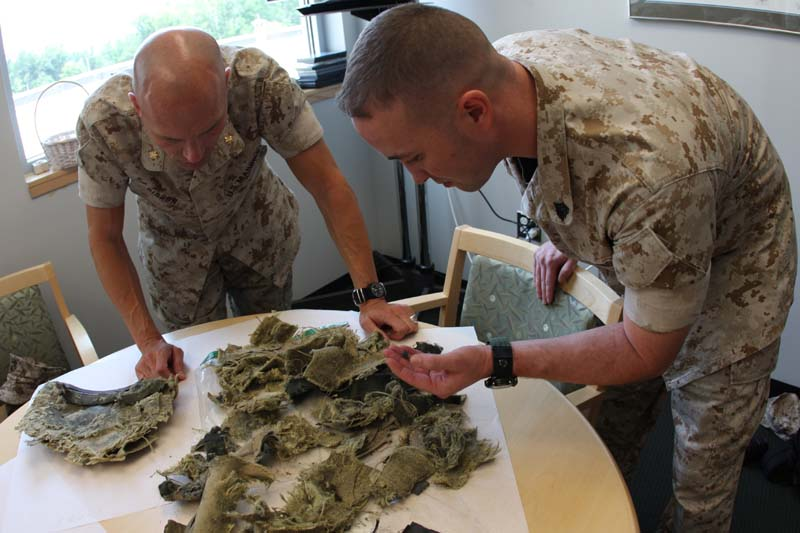
Sgt Mark Dean (right) and Maj Trent Gibson (left) inspect the remains of Dunham's helmet before it was displayed at the National Museum of the Marine Corps in July 2009

The Marine Corps Security Force Barracks at Naval Submarine Base Kings Bay was renamed the Cpl Jason Dunham Barracks in late June 2007.

The Cpl Dunham room is located at the Corporals Course at Marine Corps Air Station Beaufort, South Carolina.

A Crucible warrior's station at the Marine Corps Recruit Depot Parris Island, South Carolina and Marine Corps Recruit Depot San Diego, California was named in his honor. When recruits arrive at this station, they will read Cpl Dunham's Medal of Honor citation, and then perform ground-fighting techniques reflecting those Dunham used to defend himself and his fellow Marines leading to his nomination for the Medal of Honor.

A bill to rename the Scio post office, located at 4422 West Sciota Street in Scio, New York, as the Corporal Jason L. Dunham Post Office was submitted to the House of Representatives in December 2005 by Congressman Randy Kuhl. The bill was immediately passed in the House with support from all New York delegation members. With the support of both New York Senators Chuck Schumer and Hillary Clinton, the bill passed the Senate. On March 14, 2006, President Bush signed the bill. He also met with Dunham's family, who gave him a copy of The Gift of Valor.

== See also ==
- List of Medal of Honor recipients
- Rafael Peralta – another US marine who died while shielding others from a grenade
