= Hasselblad (disambiguation) =

Hasselblad is a Swedish camera manufacturer.

It may also refer to:

- Victor Hasselblad, company founder
- Hasselblad Masters Award, award granted by the company
- Hasselblad Foundation, not-for-profit foundation
- Hasselblad Award, granted by the foundation
