= Hasselblad =

Swedish camera manufacturer

Victor Hasselblad AB

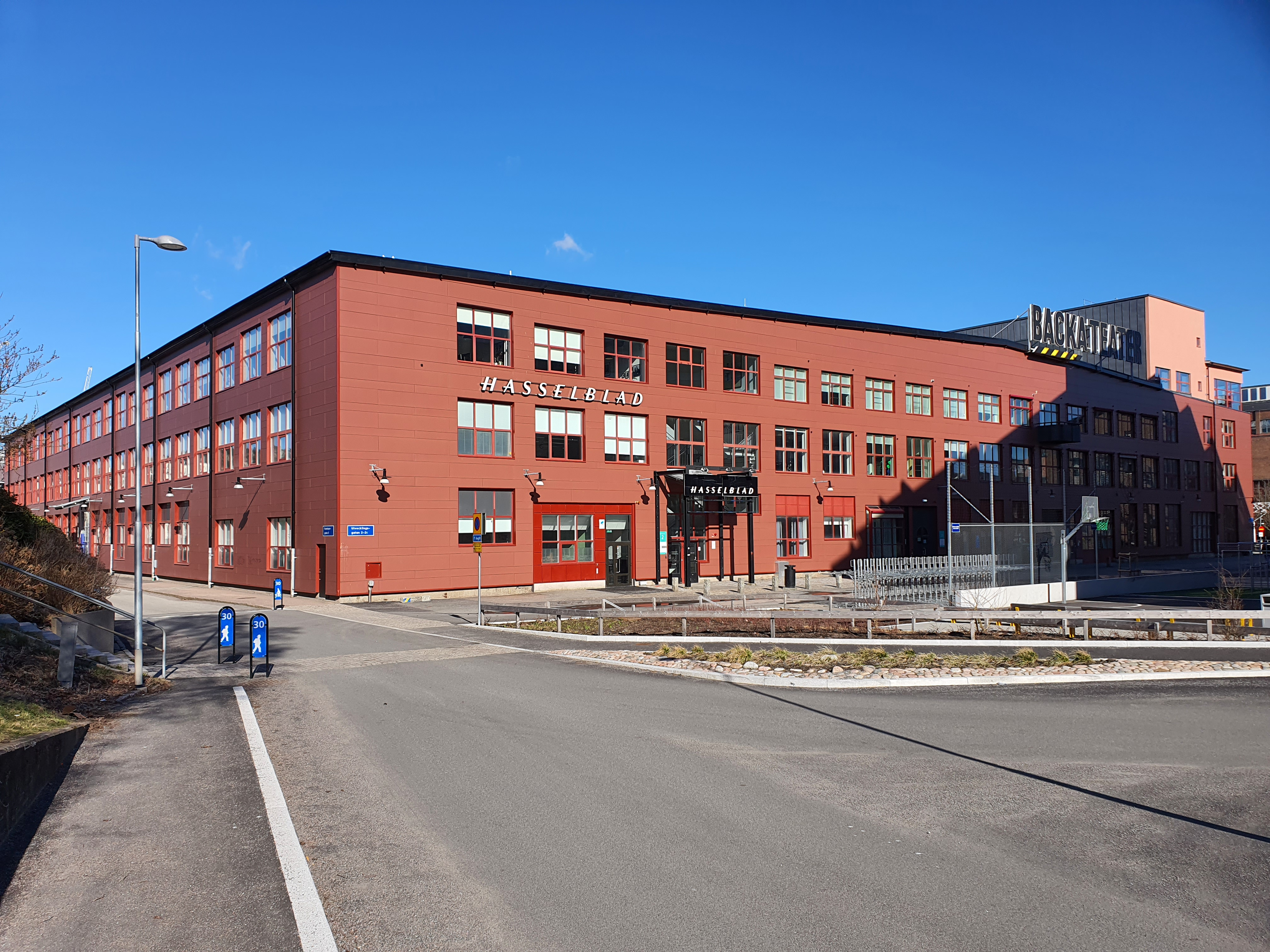
- Headquarters in Gothenburg, Sweden.
- Type: Subsidiary
- Industry: Photographic equipment and supplies
- Genre: Camera equipment
- Founded: 1841; 185 years ago in Gothenburg, Sweden
- Founder: Victor Hasselblad
- Headquarters: Gothenburg, Sweden
- Area served: Worldwide
- Key people: Victor Hasselblad
- Products: Cameras, lenses and scanners
- Revenue: ▲SEK 1.89 billion (2024)
- Operating income: ▲SEK 438.2 million (2024)
- Net income: ▲SEK 344.8 million (2024)
- Owner: DJI
- Number of employees: 210
- Subsidiaries: Hasselblad A/S, Hasselblad Bron Inc, Hasselblad Vertriebsgesellschaft mbH, Hasselblad (UK) Ltd, Hasselblad France SAS, Hasselblad Japan KK
- Website: www.hasselblad.com

Victor Hasselblad AB is a Swedish manufacturer of medium format cameras, photographic equipment and image scanners based in Gothenburg, Sweden. The company originally became known for its classic analog medium-format cameras that used a waist-level viewfinder. Perhaps the most famous use of the Hasselblad camera was during the Apollo program missions when the first humans landed on the Moon. Almost all of the still photographs taken during these missions used modified Hasselblad cameras. In 2016, Hasselblad introduced the world's first digital compact mirrorless medium-format camera, the X1D-50c, changing the portability of medium-format photography. Hasselblad produces about 10,000 cameras a year from a small three-storey building.

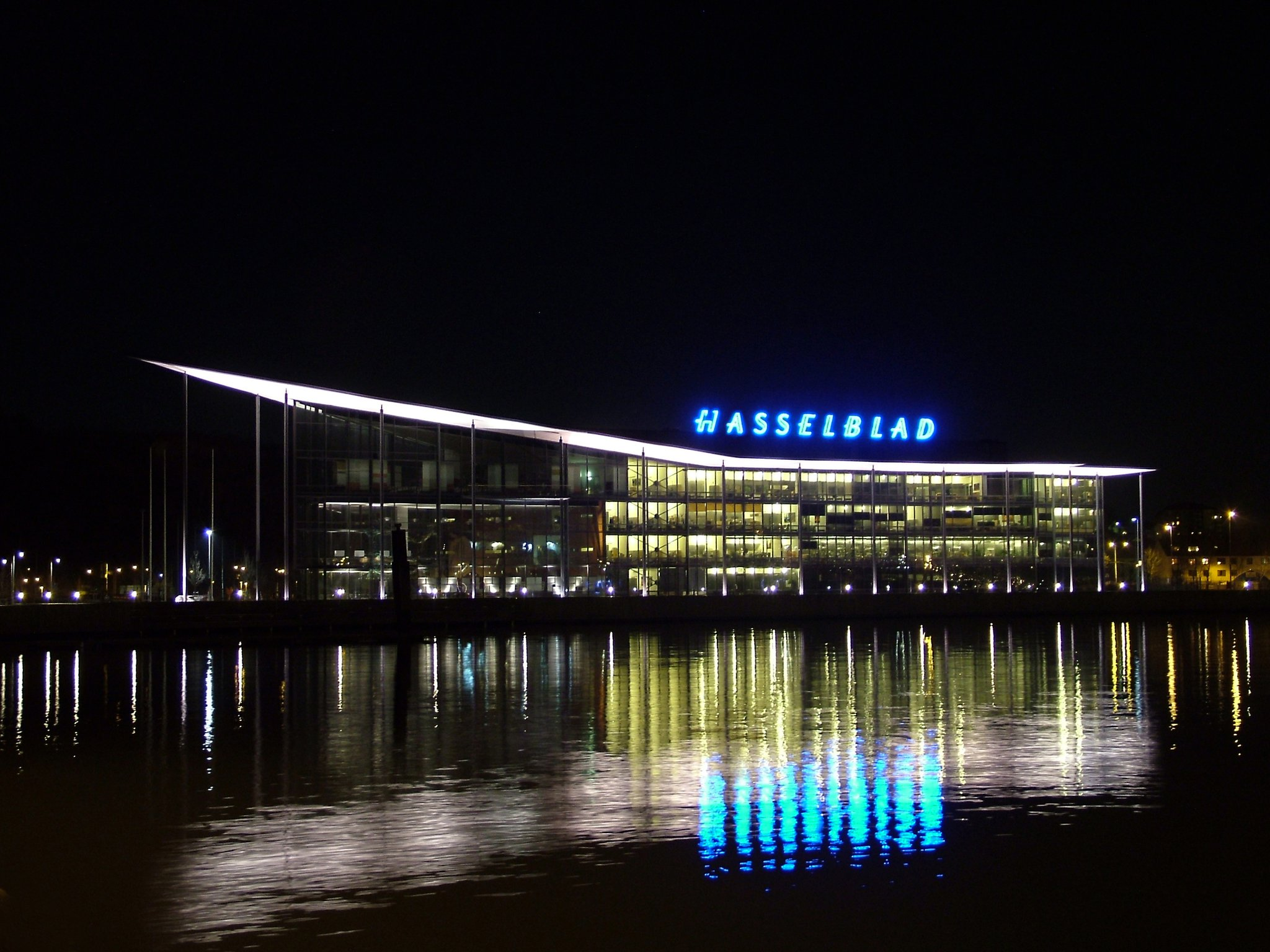
Former Hasselblad headquarters built in 2003 (now occupied by Sveriges Television AB)

== Company history ==
The company was established in 1841 in Gothenburg, Sweden, by Fritz Wiktor Hasselblad, as a trading company, F. W. Hasselblad and Co. The founder's son, Arvid Viktor Hasselblad, was interested in photography and started the photographic division of the company. Hasselblad's corporate website quotes him as saying, "I certainly don't think that we will earn much money on this, but at least it will allow us to take pictures for free."

In 1877, Arvid Hasselblad commissioned the construction of Hasselblad's long-time headquarters building, in use until 2002. While on honeymoon, Arvid Hasselblad met George Eastman, founder of Eastman Kodak. In 1888, Hasselblad became the sole Swedish distributor of Eastman's products. The business was so successful that in 1908, the photographic operations were spun off into their own corporation, Fotografiska AB. Operations included a nationwide network of shops and photo labs. Management of the company eventually passed to Karl Erik Hasselblad, Arvid's son (grandson of founder F. W.). Karl Erik wanted his son, Victor Hasselblad, to have a wide understanding of the camera business, and sent him to Dresden, Germany, then the world center of the optics industry, at age 18 (c. 1924).

Victor spent the next several years studying and working in various photography related endeavors in Europe and the US, including Rochester, New York, with George Eastman, before returning to work at the family business. Due to disputes within the family, particularly with his father, Victor left the business and in 1937 started his own photo store and lab in Gothenburg, Victor Foto.

=== World War II ===
During World War II, the Swedish military captured a fully functioning German aerial surveillance camera from a downed German plane. This was probably a Handkammer HK 12.5 cm/7x9, which bore the codename GXN and the military account number Fl.38510.

The Swedish government realised the strategic advantage of developing an aerial camera for their own use, and in the spring of 1940 approached Victor Hasselblad to help create one. In April 1940, Victor Hasselblad established a camera workshop in Gothenburg called Ross AB in a shed at an automobile shop, working in the evenings in cooperation with a mechanic from the shop and his brother, and began designing the HK7 camera.

By late 1941, the operation had over 20 employees and the Swedish Air Force asked for another camera, one which would have a larger negative and could be permanently mounted to an aircraft. This model was the SKa4. Between 1941 and 1945, Hasselblad delivered 342 cameras to the Swedish military.

In 1942, Karl Erik Hasselblad died and Victor took control of the family business. During the war, in addition to the military cameras, Hasselblad produced watch and clock parts, over 95,000 by the war's end.

=== Post-war ===
After the war, watch and clock production continued, and other machine work was also carried out, including producing a slide projector and supplying parts for Saab automobiles.

The first successful commercial camera for Hasselblad, was the Hasselblad Universal camera, which was made by Szilárd Szabad. This camera was produced in over 1500 units over a span of a few years, and quickly became the preferred all-around workhorse of the majority of professional Scandinavian photographers. It is perhaps the most important Hasselblad camera made, as it was what got Scandinavian professionals to move away from Kodak and Agfa, which had more or less 90% of the professional market at the time.

Victor Hasselblad's real ambition was to make high-quality civilian cameras. In 1945–1946, the first design drawings and wooden models were made for a camera to be called the Rossex. An internal design competition was held for elements of the camera; one of the winners was Sixten Sason, the designer of the original Saab bodywork.

In 1948, the camera later known as the 1600 F was released. The new design was complex, and many small improvements were needed to create a reliable product; the watchmaking background of many of the designers produced a design which was sophisticated, but more delicate than what was permissible for a camera. Only around 50 units were produced in 1949, and perhaps 220 in 1950, of what collectors have now designated the Series One camera. The Series Two versions of the 1600 F, perhaps as many as 3300 made from 1950 to 1953, were more reliable but still subject to frequent repairs, with many units having been cannibalized or modified by the factory. The biggest problem was its shutter, a focal-plane shutter that was hard to keep accurate. Using 120 size film it was formatted to a square 6 × 6 cm or 2 1/4 × 2 1/4 inches, which meant there was no more need to turn the camera on its side.

In 1954, they mated the groundbreaking new 38 mm Biogon lens designed by Ludwig Bertele of Zeiss to a shallow non-reflex body to produce the SWA (supreme wide angle, later changed to super wide angle). Though a specialty product not intended to sell in large numbers, the SWA was an impressive achievement, and derivatives were sold for decades. Hasselblad took their two products to the 1954 photokina trade show in Germany, and word began to spread.

In 1953, a much-improved camera, the 1000 F was released. It too had a focal-plane shutter which led to its final replacement by the 500 C but nonetheless provided a big leg up in the medium format. It had a 250 mm f4 Sonnar sport lens. Lenses ranged from a 60 mm Distagon, standard 80 mm Planar, and on up to the 250 mm.

In December 1954, the 1000 F camera received a rave review from the influential American photography magazine, Modern Photography. They put over 500 rolls of film through their test unit, and intentionally dropped it twice, and it continued to function. But the 1000 F also had shutter problems and finally gave way to the lens-mounted, tried-and-true Compur shutter, retaining its focal-plane shutter/curtain only to mask the film until the Compur shutter closed, then opened to expose the film. This was a far more dependable system, even though it meant having a shutter in each lens.

=== Hasselblad camera comes into its own ===
The real turning point for the company occurred in 1957. The 1000 F was replaced by the 500 C. The landmark 500 C design formed the basis for Hasselblad's product line for the next fifty years, with variants being produced until 2006. It was not until 1960, though, that Hasselblad's cameras became profitable; prior to this point, the company was still being entirely supported by sales of imported photographic supplies, including their distribution of Kodak products.

In 1962, NASA began to use Hasselblad cameras on space flights, and to request design modifications. The first motor-driven camera, the 500 EL, appeared in 1965 as a result of NASA requests. While Hasselblad had enjoyed a slowly but steadily growing reputation among professional photographers through the 1950s, the publicity created by NASA's use of Hasselblad products dramatically increased name recognition for the brand.

In 1966, with the increasing success of the camera division, Hasselblad exited the photographic supply and retailing industry, selling Hasselblad Fotografiska AB to Kodak.

=== 1970s onward ===
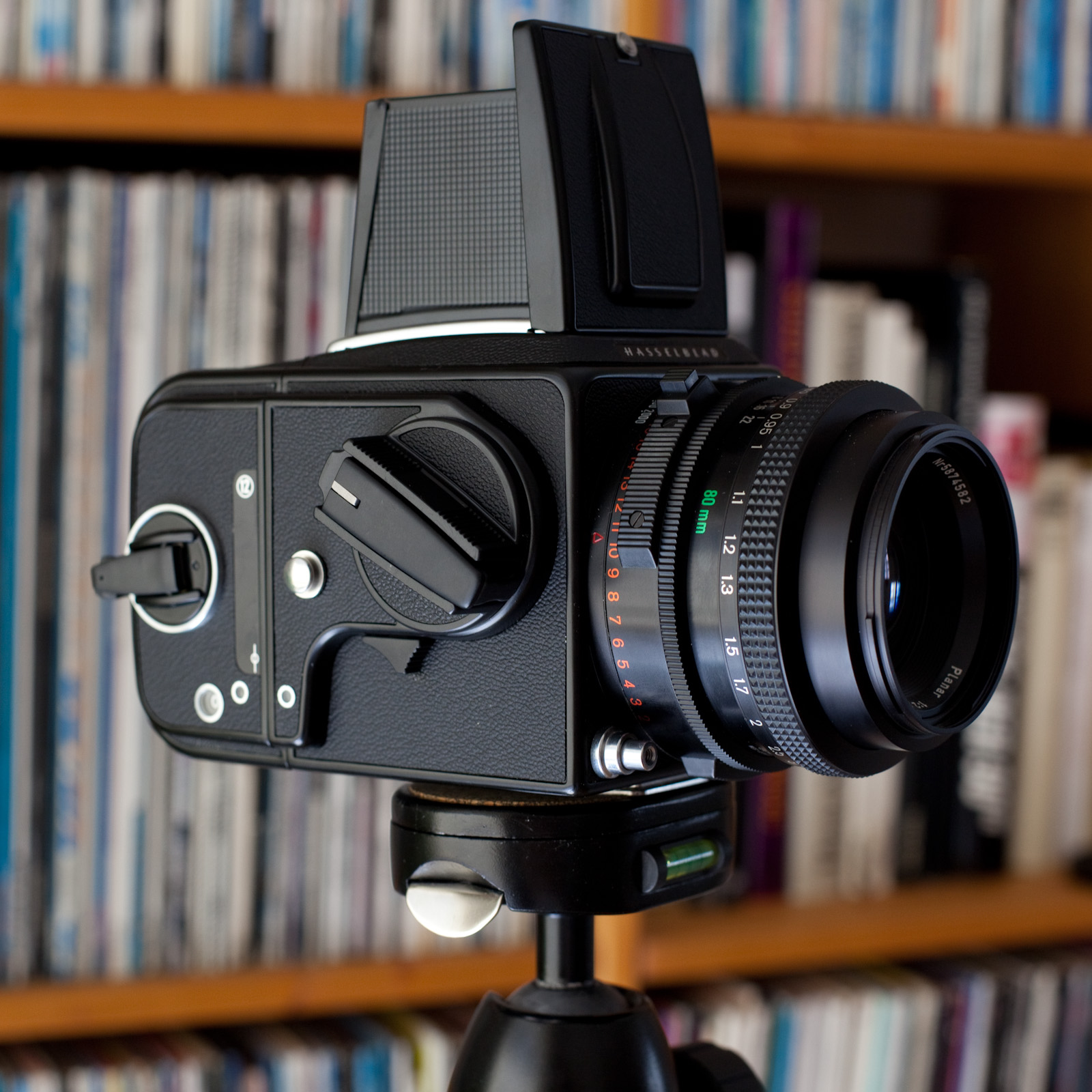
Hasselblad 2000 FC M with Zeiss Planar 80mm f2.8 T* lens

In 1976, Victor Hasselblad sold Hasselblad AB to a Swedish investment company, Säfveån AB. When he died in 1978, he left much of his fortune to the Hasselblad Foundation.

In 1977, the 2000 series of focal plane shutter equipped models was introduced. The 2000-series cameras had been intended to provide full exposure automation. The 2000 FC however was rushed and introduced without the automated features, partly because of a rethink about the way the automation should be accomplished (electronic vs. electro-mechanical). It was the last new camera produced during Victor Hasselblad's lifetime.

In 1984, Victor Hasselblad AB went public, with 42.5% of the company being sold on the Swedish stock exchange. The next year, Swedish corporation Incentive AB bought 58.1% of Hasselblad, and in 1991, they acquired the remainder of the shares, taking VHAB back to being a private corporation.

In 1985 Hasselblad established the subsidiary, Hasselblad Electronic Imaging AB, to focus on digital imaging and transmission systems.

In 1991, the 200 series of automated focal plane shutter equipped models was introduced. This was the last major technical development in the course of the classic (now known as "V-System", after Victor) Hasselblad camera.

In 1996, Hasselblad was sold, with the new owners being UBS, Cinven, and the Hasselblad management.

=== Fuji, Shriro, Imacon, and the digital age ===
In 1998, Hasselblad began selling the XPan, a camera designed and made in Japan by Fujifilm.

In 2002, they introduced the H-System, retroactively renaming their original camera line the V-System. The H-System marked an essential transition for the company. It dropped the traditional Hasselblad square negative format, instead using 6 × 4.5 cm film and a new series of lenses. The then owners had no confidence in Hasselblad's already advanced digital project returning a profit, and, seeing the relative success in the market of the modern (i.e. fully automated) 645 cameras made by manufacturers like Pentax and Mamiya, closed down Hasselblad's digital department and directed all effort towards making this 645 film camera. The H-System is largely designed and manufactured by Hasselblad, with Fuji's involvement being limited to finalizing Hasselblad's lens designs and producing the glass for the lenses and viewfinders. Fuji was allowed under the agreement to sell the H1 under their name in Japan only.

In January 2003, the Shriro Group acquired a majority shareholding in Hasselblad. The group had been the distributors for Hasselblad in Japan, Hong Kong, mainland China, Taiwan, Singapore, and Malaysia for over 45 years.

The following year, in August 2004, Shriro Sweden, the holding company of Victor Hasselblad AB, and Swedish subsidiary of Shriro Group, announced the acquisition of high-end scanner and digital cameraback manufacturer, Imacon (established in 1995 to launch the Flextight scanners). The intent of the move was to correct the mistake the previous owners made when they thought there was no money to be made selling digital products and put a stop to Hasselblad's own advanced digital project, and to renew Hasselblad's ambitions in the professional digital photographic sector.

The move was perceived as part of an industry-wide move to respond to the trend away from film to digital. Christian Poulsen, chief executive of Hasselblad after the merger (previously founder and CEO of Imacon), said, "They finally realized there was no future. It was impossible to keep Hasselblad alive without digital".

This has secured their market position, with nearly all of their previous medium format camera competition going through sale (Mamiya), closure (Contax, Bronica, Exakta 66, Kiev), or greatly reduced market presence (Rollei, Pentax—which was also sold to Hoya), and other medium format digital back makers being faced with accordingly restricted markets. Despite this Hasselblad has struggled to turn a profit relative to the market share leader Phase One.

On 30 June 2011, German private equity firm Ventizz announced it had acquired a 100% stake in Hasselblad. In 2017, Chinese drone manufacturer DJI acquired a controlling stake in Hasselblad.

== In space ==
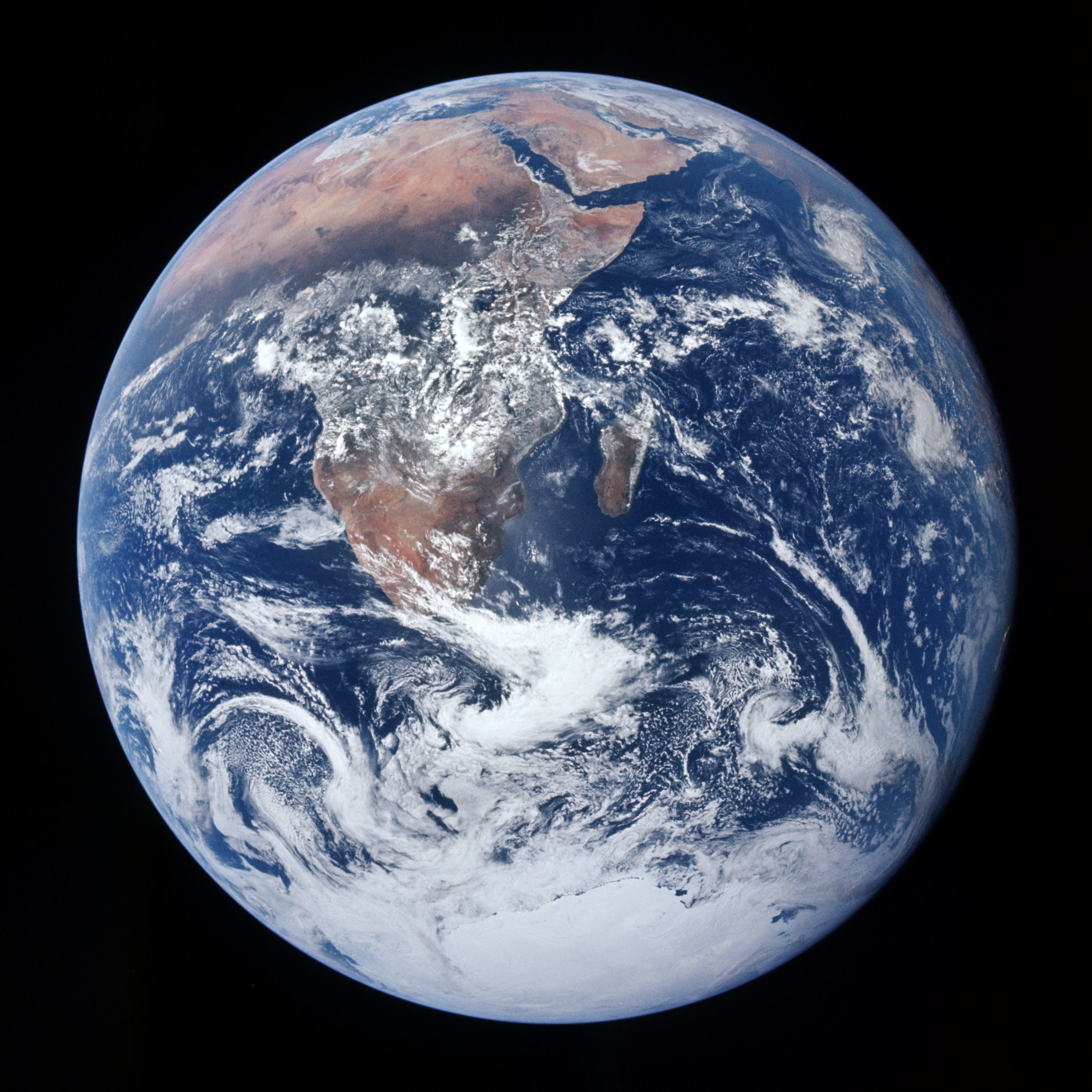
The Blue Marble taken with a 70-millimeter Hasselblad camera using an 80-millimeter Zeiss lens

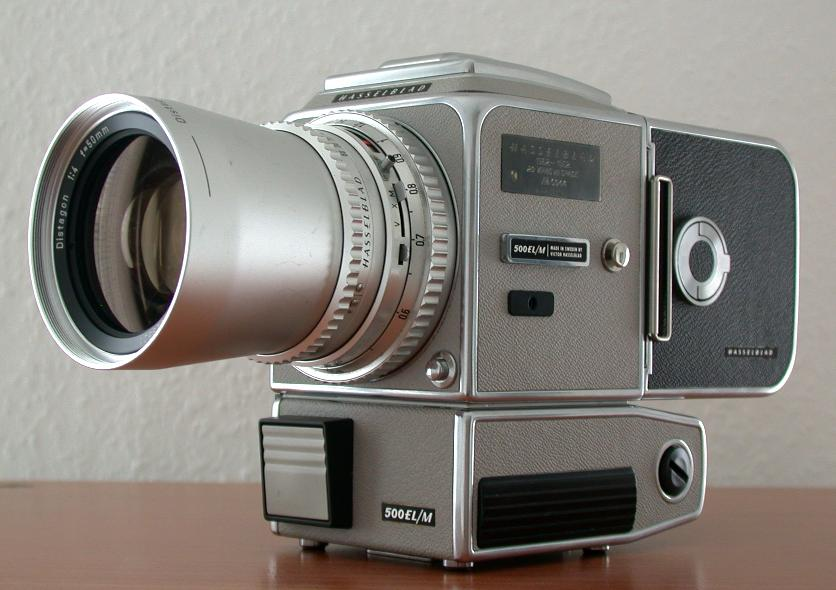
Hasselblad 500 EL/M "20 years in space" anniversary edition with 70 mm back, similar to the ones used in the Apollo Program

Several different models of Hasselblad cameras were taken into space, all specially modified for the task.

The Hasselblad cameras were selected by NASA because of their interchangeable lenses and magazines. Modifications were made to permit ease of use in cramped conditions while wearing spacesuits, such as the replacement of the reflex mirror with an eye-level finder.

Modifications by NASA technicians were further refined and incorporated into new models by Hasselblad. For example, development of a 70 mm magazine was accelerated to meet the space program.

The first modified (in fact simplified) Hasselblad 500 C cameras were used on the last two Project Mercury missions in 1962 and 1963. They continued to be used throughout the Gemini spaceflights in 1965 and 1966.

=== Apollo program ===
A general program of reliability and safety was implemented following the Apollo 1 fire in 1967, addressing such issues as reliability and safe operation of electrical equipment in a high-oxygen environment.

EL electric cameras were used for the first time on Apollo 8. A heavily modified 500 EL, the so-called Hasselblad Electric Camera (HEC) was used from Apollo 8 on board the spacecraft. Three 500 EL cameras were carried on Apollo 11. An even more extensively modified Hasselblad EL data camera (HDC), equipped with a special Zeiss 5.6/60 mm Biogon lens and film magazines for 150–200 exposures, was used on the Moon surface on the Apollo 11 mission. This command module camera, carried on Apollo 11, was a simplified version of the commercial Hasselblad 500 EL motorized film advance camera. Used for color still photography, it could operate in the command module or in the vacuum of space.

All subsequent NASA missions also had Hasselblad cameras on board. The photographic equipment and films used on the five subsequent flights were similar to that taken on Apollo 11. On Apollo 15, the 500 mm telelens was added. During the Space Shuttle period cameras based on the 500 EL/M, 553 ELX, 205 TCC and 203 FE were used.

There are 11 Hasselblad cameras currently sitting on the lunar surface, as only the film magazines were brought back to Earth.

== Products ==
=== Cameras ===
Hasselblad camera timeline
System	1940s										1950s										1960s										1970s										1980s										1990s										2000s										2010s										2020s									
System	0	1	2	3	4	5	6	7	8	9	0	1	2	3	4	5	6	7	8	9	0	1	2	3	4	5	6	7	8	9	0	1	2	3	4	5	6	7	8	9	0	1	2	3	4	5	6	7	8	9	0	1	2	3	4	5	6	7	8	9	0	1	2	3	4	5	6	7	8	9	0	1	2	3	4	5	6	7	8	9	0	1	2	3	4	5	6	7	8	9
Early		HK-7																																																																																								
Early		SKa4																																																																																								
6×6 (FP)									1600F																																																																																	
6×6 (FP)														1000F																																																																												
6×6 V															Super Wide					Super Wide C (SWC)																					SWC/M									903 SWC												905 SWC																												
6×6 V																		500C														500C/M (500 Classic, 1990–92)																								501C			501CM																															
6×6 V																																																	503CX						503CXi			503CW (503CWD, 2006)																																
6×6 V																											500EL					500EL/M													500ELX				553ELX											555ELD																														
6×6 V																																						2000 FC					2000 FC/M			2000 FCW				2003 FCW			205 TCC			205 FCC																																		
6×6 V																																																							203 FE																																			
6×6 V																																																								201 F				202 FA																														
6×6 V																																																								FlexBody																																		
6×6 V																																																										ArcBody																																
135 XPan																																																											XPan					XPan II																										
645 H																																																															H1, H1D			H2, H2D		H3D		H4D			H5D				H6D													
44×33 X																																																																	X1D			X1D II			X2D																			
44×33 X																																																																	907X																									
44×33 X																																																																	CFV			CFV II		CFV 100C																				

- HK-7 (1941–1945)
- SKa4 (1941–1945)
- 1600F (1948–1953)
- 1000F (1953–1957)
- V System 500 (1957–2013)
- V System 2000 and 200 (1977–2004)
- V System Superwide (1954–2006)
- V System Flexbody (1995–2003)
- XPan (1998–2006) (designed and manufactured by Fujifilm)
- H System (2002–present)
- Lunar (announced September 2012, shipped early 2013)
- X1D-50c (June 2016–June 2019) – the world's first digital compact medium format mirrorless camera
- H6D-400c MS (2018–present) – Multi-Shot technology camera capturing 400-megapixel images by combining four 100-megapixel photos.
- X1D II 50C (announced June 2019) – second-generation of the above
- 907X 50C (announced June 2019) – smallest Hasselblad camera body
- CFV II 50 (announced June 2019) – digital back
- X2D 100C (announced September 2022) – the third camera announced in the X system with a 100MP medium format BSI CMOS sensor
- 907X 100C (announced January 2024) — smallest and lightest Hasselblad camera body
- CFV 100C (announced January 2024) — digital back
- X2D II 100C (announced August 2025) — second generation of the X2D 100C

==== HK-7 and SKa4 military cameras ====
The HK-7 put a 7 cm tall by 9 cm wide image on 80 mm film. It has interchangeable lenses, generally a 135 mm Zeiss Biotessar, with the second being either a 240 mm f/4 Meyer Tele-Megor or a 250 mm f/5 Schneider Tele-Xenar.

The SKa4 has interchangeable film magazines, a key feature of later Hasselblad cameras.

==== 1600F and 1000F ====
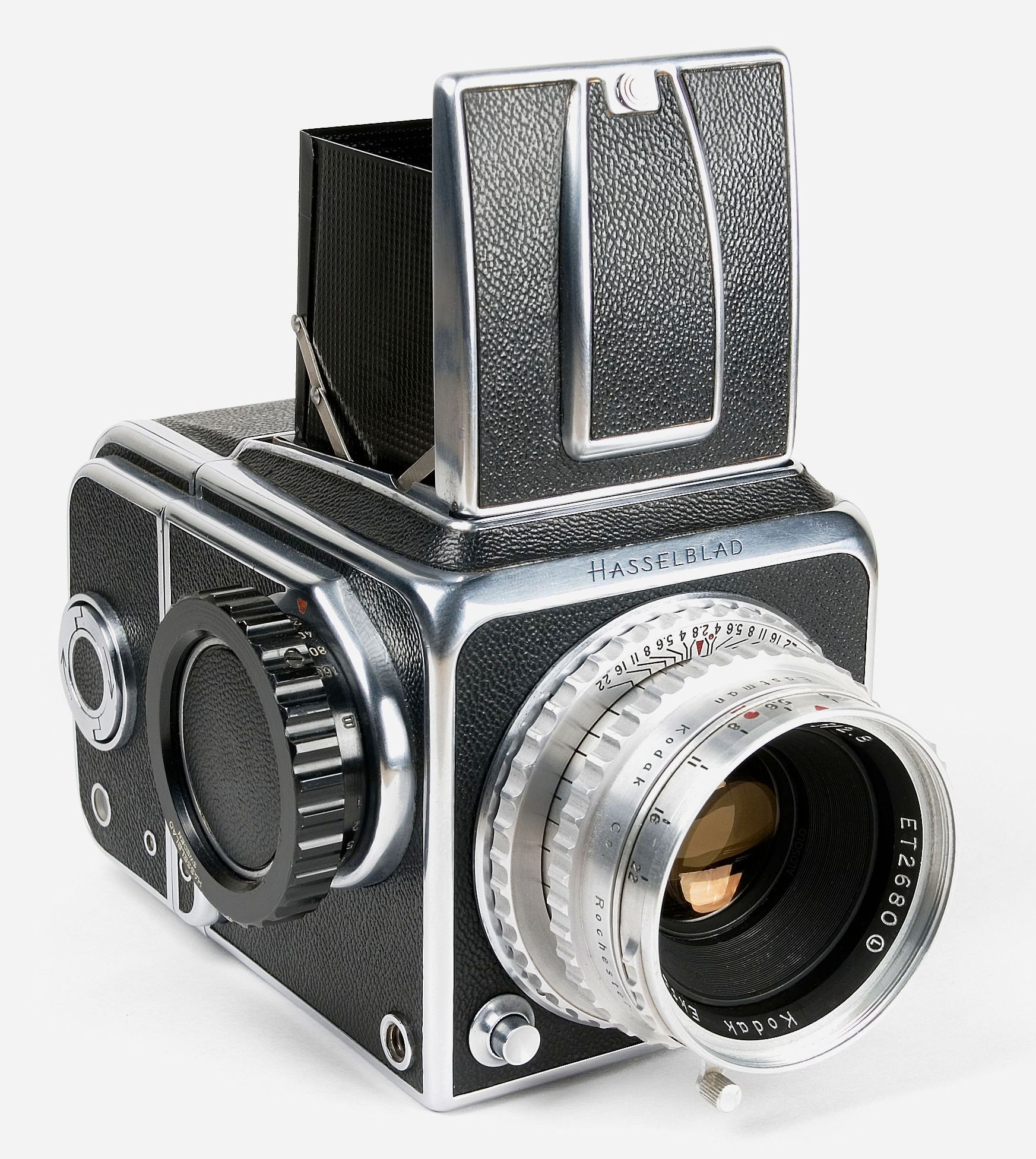
Hasselblad 1600F with Kodak Ektar 2.8/80 mm lens

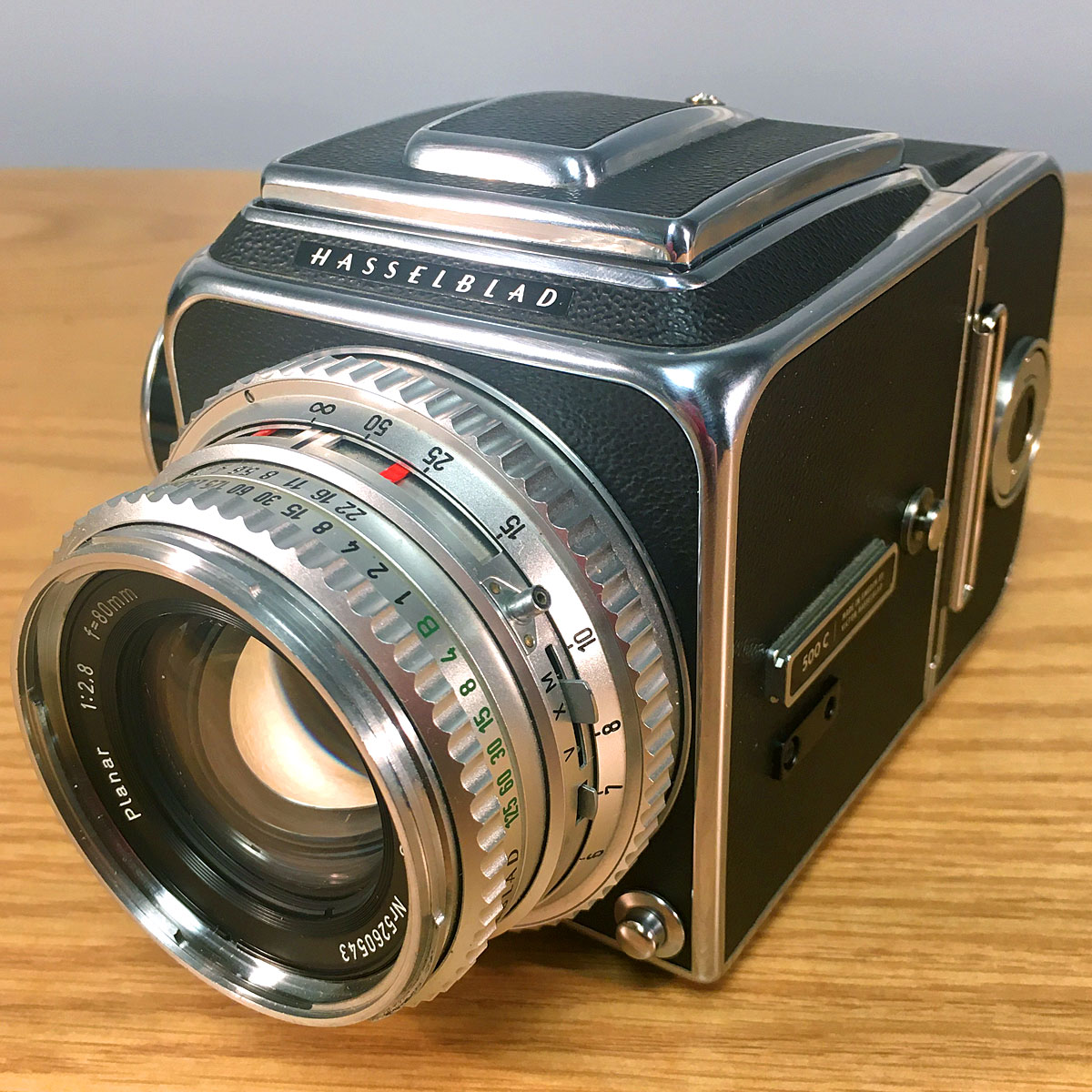
Hasselblad 500C camera with Carl Zeiss 2.8/80mm lens

Hasselblad's first civilian camera was launched in 1948. Born from the idea of Victor Hasselblad to create the "ideal camera", it was a 6 × 6 cm format focal-plane shutter SLR camera that was six inches long. First simply known as the "Hasselblad Camera" it was later named "1600F" after its highest shutter speed of 1/1600 s and "F" for "focal plane". The camera was revolutionary for the time with its modular design that allowed exchanging lenses, viewfinders and film magazines. The shutter was made of thin stainless steel which was light and durable enough to withstand the high acceleration forces of this fast shutter.

The 1600F cameras did show a couple of problems (especially the first series) so a number of changes were introduced during the production period that lasted from 1949 to 1953. The 1600F was initially released with the Kodak Ektar 2.8/80 mm and the Ektar 3.5/135 mm lenses. Only prototypes were made of the Ektar 6.3/55 mm and the 5.6/254 mm lenses.

The successor of the 1600F was the 1000F (1953–1957). The 1000F was named after its reduced shortest shutter speed of 1/1000 s. The 1000F has a different shutter mechanism and proved to be more reliable and robust than its predecessor. During production of the 1600F, Carl Zeiss in Oberkochen had become a supplier of lenses for the 1600F/1000F cameras. Zeiss supplied the lenses Distagon 5.6/60 mm, Tessar 2.8/80 mm, Sonnar 3.5/135, Sonnar 4.0/250 and Sonnar 5.6/250 mm. Towards the end of the 1000 F production period a Dallmeyer 5.6/508 mm lens made by Cook and Perkins, England, was also available, but did not fully cover the full film format.

Hasselblad 1000F and especially 1600F cameras are very rare on the secondhand market and usually not in working condition because of age, neglect, and a lack of spare parts and qualified repairmen. Many cameras suffer from corrosion of the chrome rims. A lot of lenses suffer from scratches, fungus, discoloration and separation. Cameras in good condition can therefore fetch fairly high prices.

The 500C was produced to replace the F-series cameras. It changed the troublesome focal plane shutter for a leaf shutter in each C lens. The camera has continued for over 40 years with only minor improvements. A variation of the 500C was used by NASA for all their Gemini and Apollo missions. Most lenses were made by Zeiss in Germany but the very early 1600F lenses were made by Kodak.

- 1600F (1948/1949–1953, 1/1600 s shutter speed)
- 1000F (1953–1957, 1/1000 s shutter speed)

==== V System ====
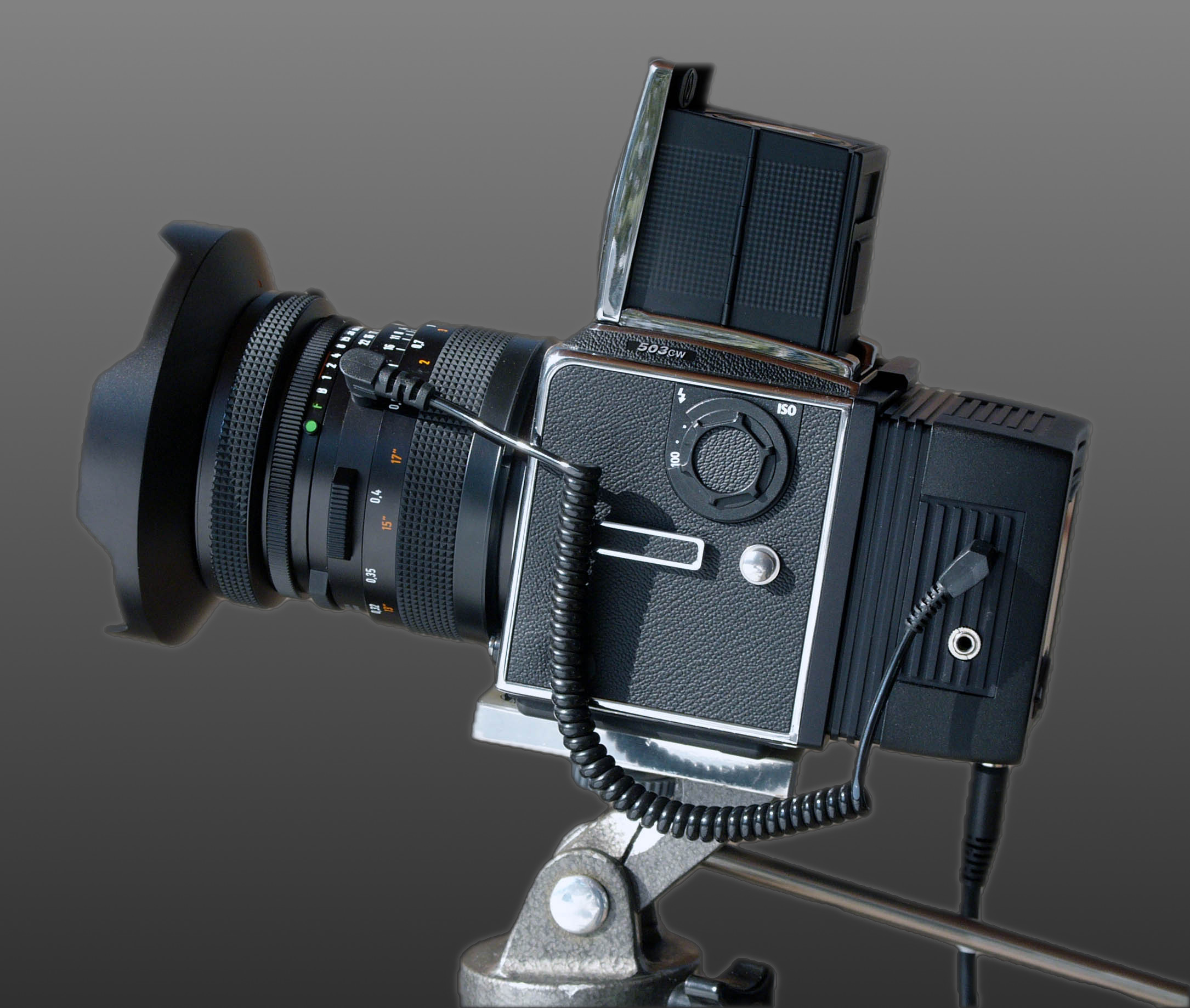
Hasselblad 503 CW with Zeiss Distagon 3,5/30 and Ixpress V96C

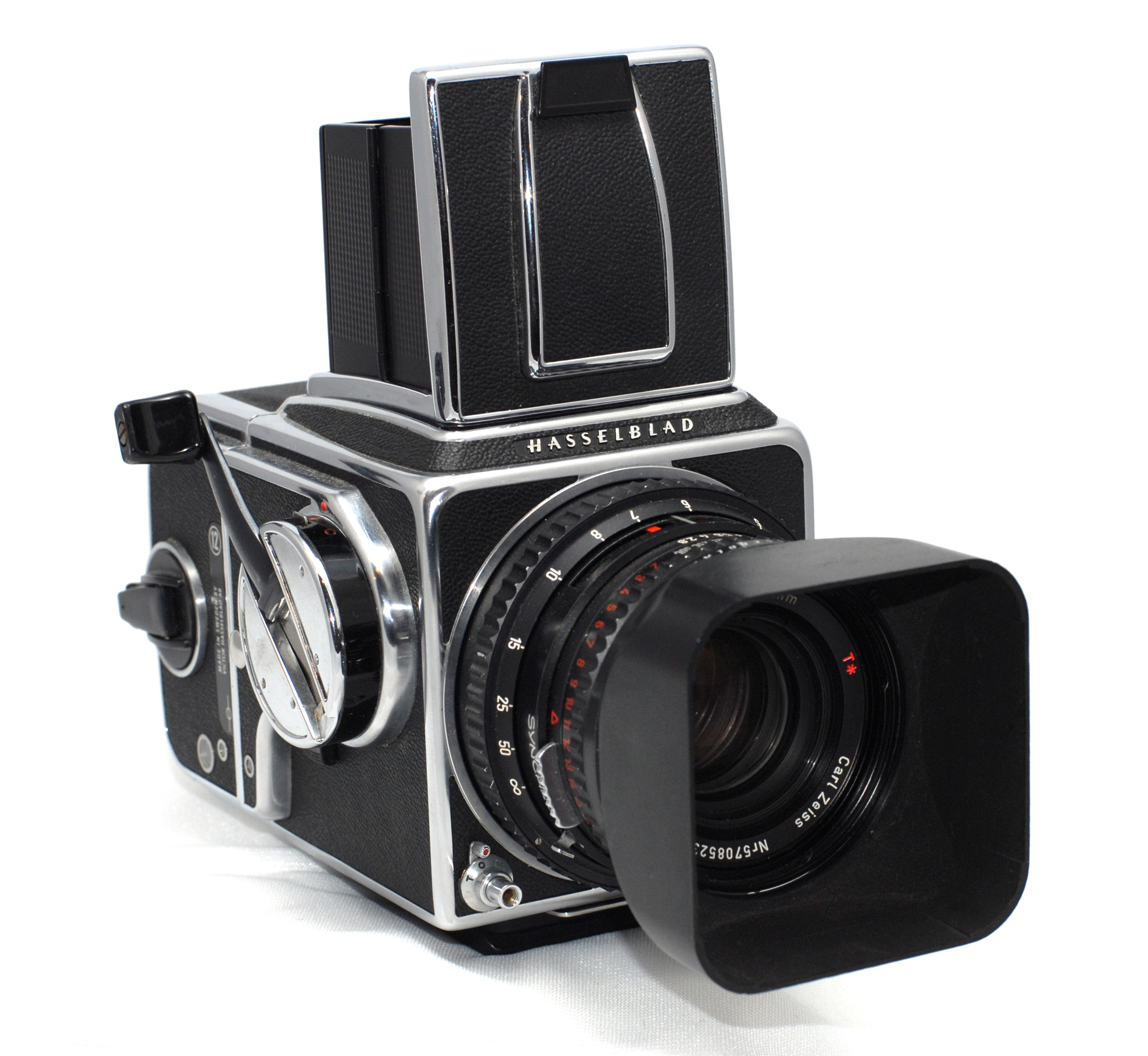
Hasselblad 500 C/M with Zeiss lens

The name "V System" was not created until the development of the "H System"; with a new system premiering, Hasselblad needed a designation to differentiate the older product line. The Hasselblad V-System evolved out of Victor Hasselblad's desire to develop a small camera with fast lenses and shutters, that was as easily hand-holdable as a Leica, but with a larger film format. The Rolleiflex's 6 × 6 format was deemed ideal: large enough to provide high image quality, but small enough to fit inside a compact camera. The Rolleiflex's leaf shutter lacked the fast shutter speeds focal plane shutters could provide, and neither Leica rangefinder nor Rolleiflex TLR provided the(TTL) through the (taking) lens viewing that the slow to use, big Graflex SLR provided. These considerations led to the 1600 F and a flexible camera system that includes interchangeable bodies, lenses, viewfinders, winders, film magazines and holders, and other accessories. Problems with the focal plane shutters in the 1600 F and 1000 F cameras and especially the increasing importance of electronic flash led to the development of the manual leaf shutter-based medium-format 6 × 6 (6 × 6 cm or 2¼ × 2¼ inches) 500 C SLR camera in 1957 which offered flash synchronization at all shutter speeds. The 500 C was joined by the motor-driven 500 EL SLR camera in 1964. Apart from the housing that incorporates the motor drive and the NiCd batteries, this camera is similar in appearance and operation to the Hasselblad 500 C and uses the same magazines, lenses and viewfinders. These two cameras, together with the Superwide Camera (SWC) which was introduced in 1954 as a wide angle camera using the Carl Zeiss Biogon 38 mm f/4.5 lens and built-in levels for exacting architecture photography, formed the core of the V-system and shared most accessories (with a few exceptions).

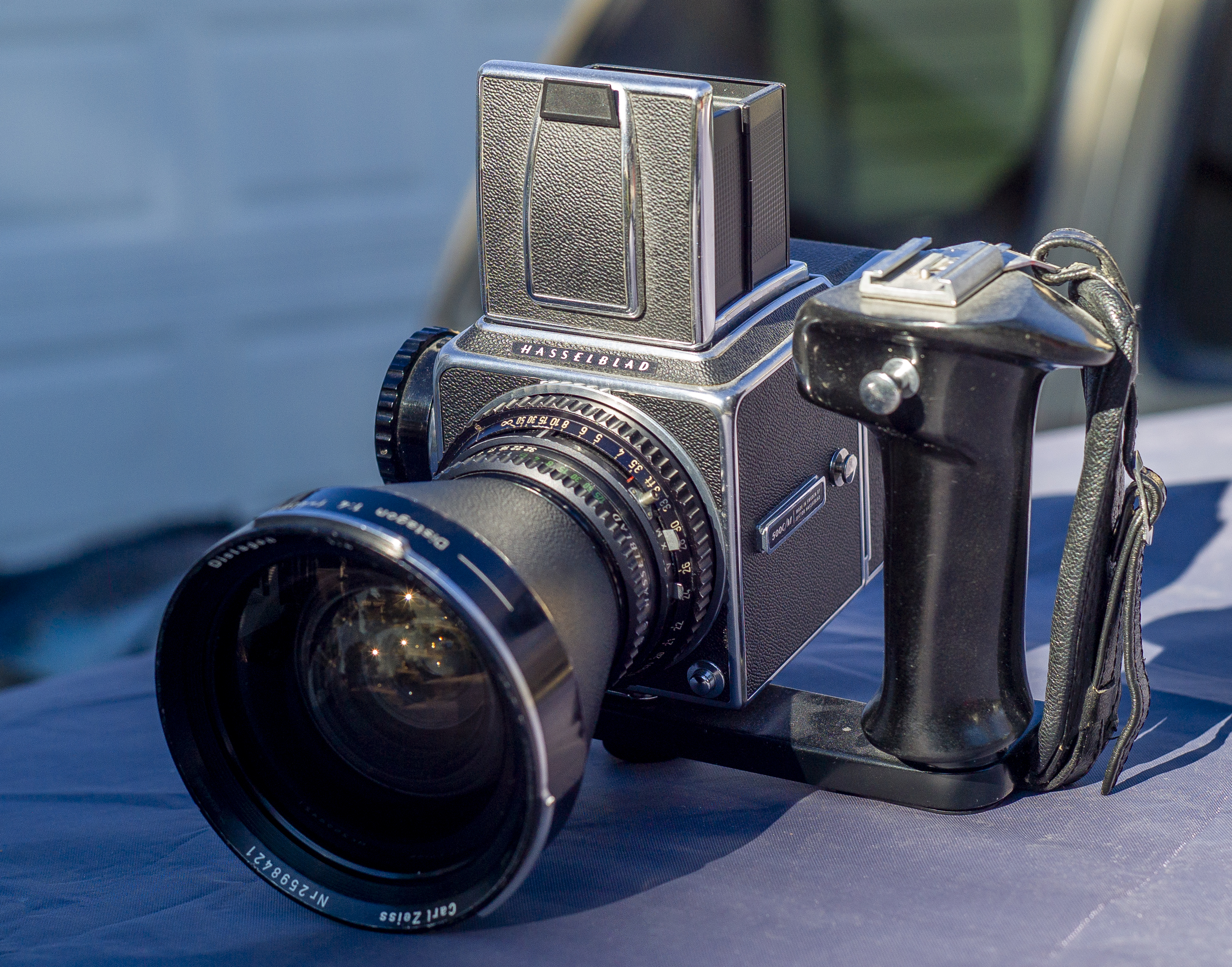
Hasselblad 500 C/M with Grip and Zeiss 40mm Distagon

Throughout the life of the V Series, Hasselblad incrementally updated the cameras. The 500C gave way to the 500C/M, the 503CX and 503CXi, the 501C and 501CM, and finally the 503CW as the basic manual. The SWC was replaced by the SWC/M, the 903 SWC, and finally by the 905 SWC. The 500 EL's replacements included the 500EL/M, 500ELX, 553 ELX, and the 555ELD. First introduced in the 500ELX, TTL/OTF (through the lens/off the film) flash metering was also a feature of the 503CX, which was replaced by the 503CXi and finally the 503CW. The 503CWD was the very last iteration of the V-series line and was a limited edition variant produced in 2006 to commemorate the centenary of the birth of Victor Hasselblad (born 1906). The 503CWD was supplied with a match-numbered CFV-16 digital back. The entire production run was limited to only 500 units, all numbered. However, the universal models can choose phase one or leaf if they prefer to have a digital medium format back. Some people also modified Fuji instax film camera to be the back holding instax films.

The V system of cameras are modular with interchangeable lenses and backs. The interchangeable film backs were originally designed to accommodate medium format film (220 & 120) and supported various aspect ratios, e.g. 6X6, 6X4.5, etc. and were also available as Polaroid film backs and for 70mm film. The viewfinders were also designed to be fully modular with interchange able focusing screens, waist-level finders, sports finders as well as eye-level prism finders that were offered in 90 and 45 degrees for ease of use.

Alongside the 500-series cameras, a series of focal plane shutter cameras was introduced. This 2000-series started with the 2000 FC, and progressed to the 2000 FC/M, 2000 FCW and 2003 FCW. Though much of the 20 years between the discontinuation of the 1000F and the introduction of the 2000 FC was spent designing an improved focal plane shutter, the 2000-series again used corrugated metal foil as material for the shutter curtains, though now titanium replaced the original stainless steel. As before, the metal shutter curtains proved to be quite easily damaged by clumsy fingers, which is why all 2000-series cameras except the 2000FC have a safety feature that retracts the shutter curtains as soon as the magazine is taken off. The 2000-series cameras were replaced by the 200-series cameras (with rubberized cloth shutter curtains), which included the 201 F, 202 FA, 203 FE, and 205 TCC/205 FCC. While the 201 F was a manual control camera, the other three 200-series models added a level of metering and exposure automation to the V series.

There were also two series of medium format view cameras developed related to the V series: the FlexBody and the ArcBody.

The last V System camera, the 503CW, was officially discontinued on April 29, 2013. In 2014, Hasselblad introduced the CFV-50c back, which uses a digital image sensor and is compatible with V system cameras; the sensor is the same one supplied with the H5D-50c digital SLR and has an active area of 43.2×32.9 mm (1.70×1.30 in), so using the CFV-50c back with V system lenses will result in a crop factor for equivalent focal length. The CFV back subsequently has been updated with different sensors in 2019 (CFV II 50C) and 2024 (CFV 100C), retaining the same sensor size.

500 Series

- 500C (1957–1970, Leaf Shutter)
- 500C/M (1970–1994, Leaf Shutter)
- 500 Classic (1990–1992, Leaf Shutter)
- 501C (1994–1997, Leaf Shutter)
- 501CM (1997–2005, Leaf Shutter)
- 503CX (1988–1994, Leaf Shutter, TTL OTF flash system)
- 503CXi (1994–1996, Leaf Shutter, TTL OTF flash system)
- 503CW (1996–2013, Leaf Shutter, TTL OTF flash system)
- 503CWD (2006, limited edition centenary model; Leaf Shutter, TTL OTF flash system)

2000 Series Cameras with Titanium Focal Plane Shutter

- 2000 FC (1977–1982, Titanium Focal Plane Shutter)
- 2000 FC/M (1982–1984, Titanium Focal Plane Shutter)
- 2000 FCW (1984–1988, Titanium Focal Plane Shutter)
- 2003 FCW (1988–1991, Titanium Focal Plane Shutter)

200 Series Cameras with Rubberized Cloth Focal Plane Shutter

- 205 TCC (1991–1994, Rubberized Cloth Focal Plane Shutter)
- 201 F (1994–1998, Rubberized Cloth Focal Plane Shutter)
- 203 FE (1994–2004, Rubberized Cloth Focal Plane Shutter)
- 205 FCC (1995–2004, Rubberized Cloth Focal Plane Shutter)
- 202 FA (1998–2002, Rubberized Cloth Focal Plane Shutter)

Super Wide-angle (SW) cameras with fixed lenses

- SWA & SW (1954–1958, Leaf Shutter, fixed Carl Zeiss Biogon f/4.5 38 mm wide angle lens)
- SWC (1959–1979, Leaf Shutter)
- SWC/M (1980–1988, Leaf Shutter)
- 903 SWC (1988–2001, Leaf Shutter)
- 905 SWC (2001–2006, Leaf Shutter)

View Cameras

- FlexBody (1995–2003, Tilt and shift possible, Normal Hasselblad mount )
- ArcBody (1997–2001, Tilt and shift possible, Special mount with only 3 Rodenstock lenses with wider image circle)

EL series

- 500EL (1964–1970)
- 500EL/M (1971–1984, introduced user-interchangeable screen),
- 500ELX (1984–1988, introduced TTL-flash sensor and larger non-vignetting mirror),
- 553ELX (1988–1999, introduced new internal light-absorbing coating and use of AA-batteries), and
- 555ELD (1998–2006, introduced new mirror mechanics and electronic contacts for communication with digital backs)

500EL and its successors have been, and still are, used mainly as workhorses in photo studios. A heavily modified version was used in the U.S. Apollo lunar exploration program. In 1968, it was used by astronaut William Anders to take the image known as Earthrise. As an outgrowth of the experience with NASA cameras, a photogrammetric version of the Hasselblad 500 EL/M, the Hasselblad MK 70, was constructed with specially calibrated components.

==== XPan ====
The dual-format XPan and XPan II were Hasselblad's first cameras to use 35mm film. Built with a rubber-covered titanium and aluminium body, they were designed as a coupled rangefinder camera with interchangeable, compact lenses.

The XPan cameras are re-branded versions of the Fuji TX-1 and TX-2. The XPan II has every feature of the original, but grants the user the ability to record thirty-minute exposures compared to the old limit of three minutes. Electronic exposure information in the viewfinder is another additional feature of the XPan II.

The XPan reverted to the focal plane shutter, offering 8–1/1000 s, and flash sync from B (max. 270 s) – 1/125 s.

The intent in releasing the XPan was to provide medium format image quality on 35mm film. The XPan utilised the entire area of the 35mm film for either panorama or 35mm format, providing a panorama effect without masking the film or reducing image quality. This technique produced a panorama negative almost three times larger than traditional masking and over five times larger than that of APS cameras.

The XPan is now discontinued.

- XPan (1998, focal plane shutter, 35mm, Panoramic capability)
- XPan II (2003, focal plane shutter, 35mm, Panoramic capability)

==== H System ====
Hasselblad launched the H System at photokina in September 2002.

===== H1 =====
The H1 departed from previous Hasselblad cameras in several respects. Hasselblad moved away from the traditional 6 × 6 format to 6 × 4.5 cm, and included autofocus lenses.

The camera used Fujinon manufactured lenses and prisms, thus departing from Hasselblad's long association with Carl Zeiss when it comes to lens manufacturing. The shutter in the lenses was still manufactured by Hasselblad as well as the body. Hasselblad initially invited both PhaseOne and Kodak to develop digital backs for the H-System.

The H1 had a number of other innovations, including:

- replacement of the removable dark slide with a fold-out lever
- inserts and backs that could accept both 120 and 220 film
- automatic film advance
- digital back integration
- electronic leaf shutters with timing from 1/800 seconds down to 18 hours

As with the V-series, most H1- and H2-series components were compatible with one another.

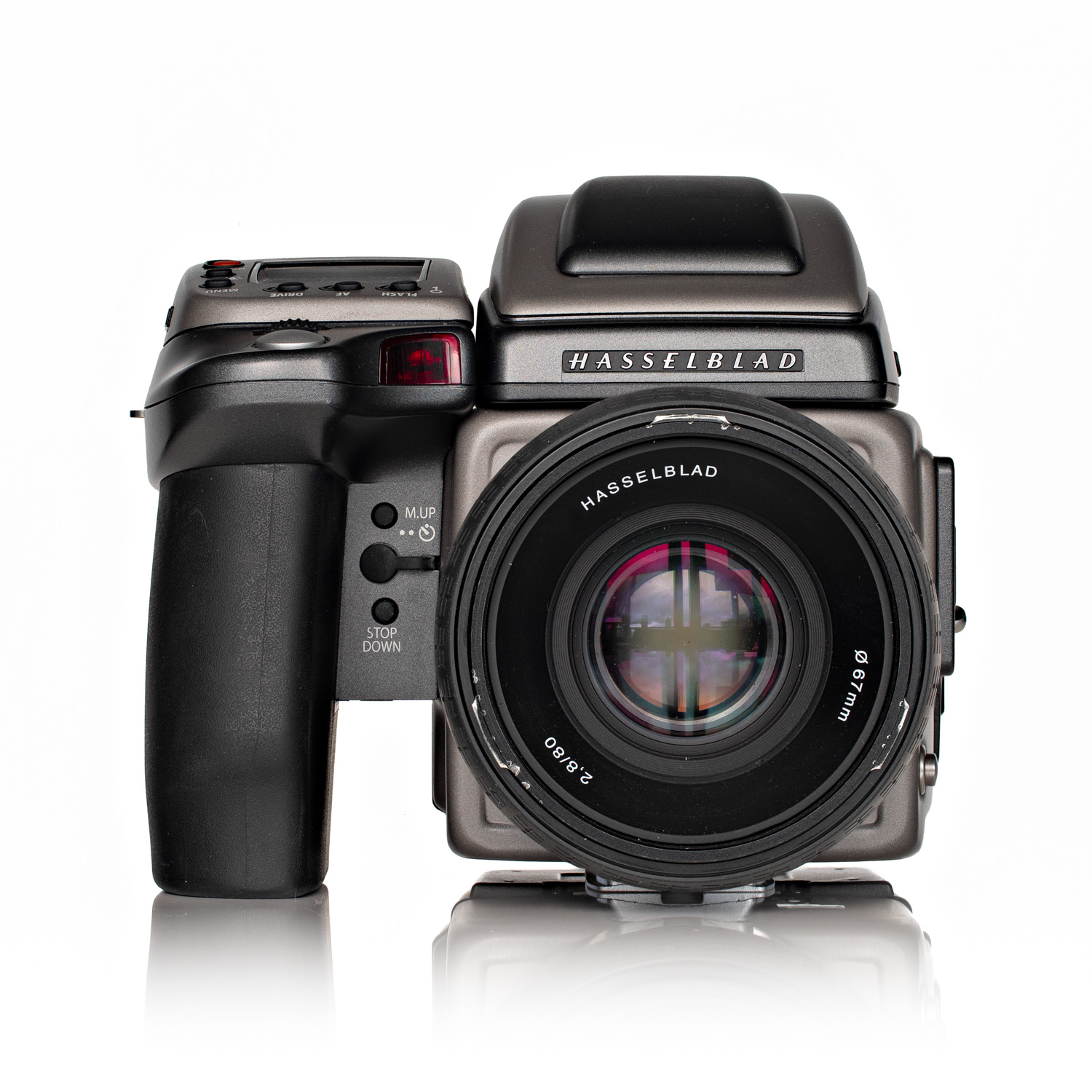
Hasselblad H2 with HC 80mm F2.8

===== H1D =====
Identical to the H1, but sold bundled with a Hasselblad-branded Imacon 22Mp iXpress back which coupled with a 40 GB Image Bank allowed shooting of up to 850 images in one session. The camera could only be used with the included digital back. This was Hasselblad's first integrated DSLR.

===== H2 =====
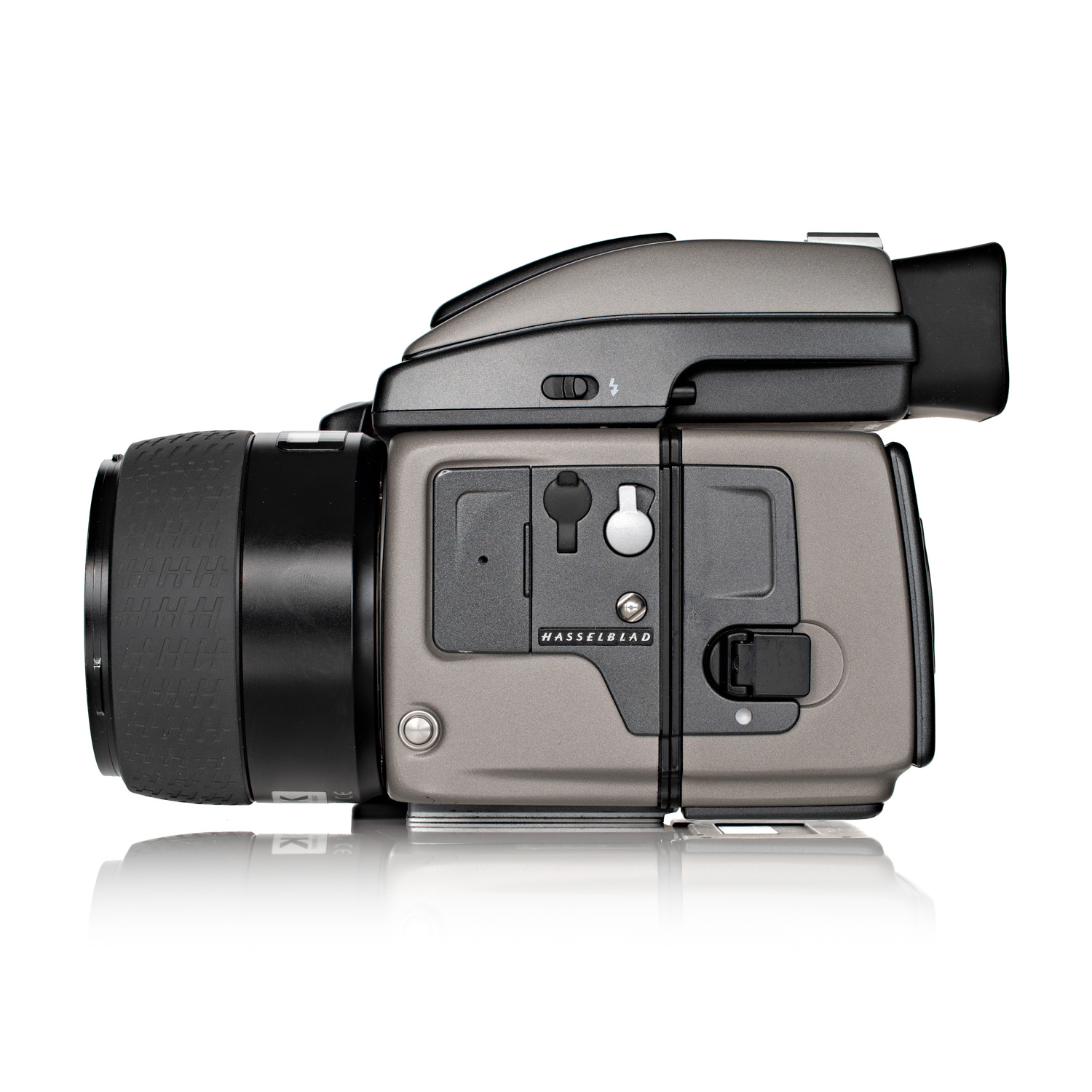
Side profile of the Hasselblad H2 with HC 80mm F2.8 and HM 16-32 Film back

Hasselblad has built into the H2 cross-platform camera a new single-battery operation of the camera with the new Ixpress CFH digital back, offering one on/off switch and one operating system, facilitating streamlined, integrated operation. With existing digital backs already in the market, the H2 delivers the exact functionality of the H1. The H2 camera was discontinued in October 2007.

===== H2D =====
2nd generation integrated DSLR. First Hasselblad camera to shoot to new Raw format called the 3FR. Conversions to 3F files could be done in Flexcolor or Phocus. Can use a CF card. No longer necessary to shoot to an Image Bank via link cable. Firewire 800 capable. New metering patterns to match the larger sensors. A new lithium ion 1,850 mAh battery was introduced that would power both the H2D body and digital back.

===== H2F =====
The H2F can be used either as a film camera or as a digital camera when mated with a Hasselblad CF31, CF22, CF22 MS, CF39, or CF39 MS back. It is completely identical to the H2, but this camera was created to "lock out" other digital back providers from the H-series platform. The H2F is compatible with all of the H lenses, including the HCD 24mm, HCD 28mm, and the new HCD 35-90mm zoom lens.

===== H3D =====
3rd generation integrated DSLR. The H3D offered software functionality that provided better integration between camera, viewfinder and back than the earlier H1 or H2 could provide. These two early H-System cameras, after all, were not primarily designed as digital cameras, with the H2 carrying the 'legacy' of the H1. Hasselblad's official position on the move was:

"In truth, [the H1] was a great film camera to which a digital back could be fitted, and...Hasselblad started to look at ways that image quality and functionality could be enhanced even more through better integration...The H2 camera has not, in any way, been diminished by Hasselblad's separate development of functions specifically for the integrated H3D. However, lacking the necessary integration of the new camera engine and Hasselblad Flexcolor software, these functions cannot work on the H2."

===== H3DII =====
4th generation integrated DSLR. Introduced in 2007, the H3DII systems have a higher level of integration between the camera and the image sensor than stand-alone digital camera backs, but a disadvantage is that film backs are not usable in the H3DII. Improvements of the HD3DII line were:

- larger and improved 3" TFT display
- new heat sink replaces the fan from the original H3D, making the digital back quieter
- drive button is now WB/ISO. Drive functions moved in the Menu
- new ability to use the GIL (Global Image Locator)

The current H3DII products include:

Model	Sensor	ISO range	ISO range (with Phocus)	Capture speed	6x4.5 Crop Factor	Eq. focal length	Display	Storage
H3DII-31	33.1 mm × 44.2 mm, 31 megapixels, 16 bit, CCD, increased sensitivity thanks to microlenses	100–800	100–1600	1.2 s	1.3	31 mm	3" TFT	CF
H3DII-39	36.8 mm × 49.0 mm, 39 megapixels, 16 bit, CCD	50–400	50–800	1.4 s	1.1	28 mm	3" TFT	CF
H3DII-50	36.8 mm × 49.0 mm, 50 megapixels, 16 bit, CCD	50–400	50–800	1.1 s	1.1	28 mm	3" TFT	CF

===== H4D =====
5th generation integrated DSLR. Introduced in 2009, the current H4D products include H4D-31, H4D-40, H4D-50, H4D-50MS, H4D-60 and H4D-200MS.

Model	Sensor	ISO range	ISO range (with Phocus)	Capture speed	HC lens factor	Eq. focal length	Display	Storage	Video recording
H4D-40	33.1 mm × 44.2 mm, 40 megapixels, 16 bit	100-800	100–1600	1.1 s	1.3	31 mm	3"	CF	
H4D-50	36.8 mm × 49.1 mm, 50 megapixels, 16 bit	50–400	50–800	1.1 s	1.1	28 mm	3"	CF	
H4D-60	40.2 mm × 53.7 mm, 60 megapixels, 16 bit	50–400	50–800	1.1 s	1.0	28 mm	3"	CF	
H4D-200MS	36.7 mm × 49.1 mm, 50 megapixels, 16 bit 200 megapixels in multishot mode	50–400	50–800	1.1 s	1.0	28 mm	3"	CF	None

===== H4X =====
On October 27, 2011, Hasselblad introduced the H4X as a replacement H1, H2 and H2F.

===== H5D =====
6th generation integrated DSLR. Introduced in 2012, the current H5D products include H5D-40, H5D-50, H5D-50MS, H5D-60 and H5D-200MS.

Model	Sensor	ISO range	ISO range (with Phocus)	Capture speed	HC lens factor	Eq. focal length	Display	Storage	Video recording
H5D-40	32.9 mm × 43.8 mm, 40 megapixels, 16 bit	100–800	100–1600	1.1 s	1.3	31 mm	3"	CF	
H5D-50	36.8 mm × 49.1 mm, 50 megapixels, 16 bit	50–400	50–800	1.1 s	1.1	28 mm	3"	CF	
H5D-60	40.2 mm × 53.7 mm, 60 megapixels, 16 bit	50–400	50–800	1.1 s	1.0	28 mm	3"	CF	
H5D-200MS	36.7 mm × 49.1 mm, 50 megapixels, 16 bit 200 megapixels in multishot mode	50–400	50–800	1.1 s	1.0	28 mm	3"	CF	None

===== H5D-50C =====
In January 2014, Hasselblad introduced the H5D-50C

===== H5X =====
On September 9, 2014, Hasselblad introduced the H5X as a replacement H1, H2, H2F and H4X. Improvements of the H5X were:

- backup camera for H5D users
- True Focus
- full HC and HCD lens compatibility, including HCD-24, HCD-28 and the HCD 35-90 zoom lens
- HVD-90x viewfinder optimised for 36x48 mm format
- HV-90x-II viewfinder optimised for the film and 40.2 × 53.7 mm format
- high power AF illumination
- eight memory banks (profiles) for easier access to previously saved camera settings
- new programmable button options available with an H5D sensor unit

===== H5D-50C WiFi =====
On September 16, 2014, Hasselblad introduced the H5D-50C WiFi.

===== H6D-50c, H6D-100c, and H6D-400c MS =====
In April 2016, Hasselblad introduced the H6D product line. The current H6D products include H6D-50c, H6D-100c, and H6D-400c MS.

Model	Sensor	ISO range	Capture speed	Shutter speed	Flash sync speed	Display	Storage	Video recording	Host connection type
H6D-50C	CMOS, 50 MP (8272 × 6200 pixels, 5.3 × 5.3 μm), 43.8 × 32.9 mm, 16 bit	100–6400	1.7–2.3 s	60 min to 1/2000 s	Flash usable at all shutter speeds	3''	CFast card, SD card or tethered to Mac or PC	HD (1920 × 1080p)	USB 3.0 (5 Gbit/s) Type-C connector, Mini HDMI, Audio In/out
H6D-100C	CMOS, 100 MP (11600 × 8700 pixels, 4.6 × 4.6 μm), 53.4 × 40.0 mm, 16 bit	64–12800	TBD	60 min to 1/2000 s	Flash usable at all shutter speeds	3''	CFast card, SD card or tethered to Mac or PC	HD (1920 × 1080p); UHD/4K (3840 × 2160p)	USB 3.0 (5 Gbit/s) Type-C connector, Mini HDMI, Audio In/out
H6D-400C MS	CMOS, 100 MP (11600 × 8700 pixels, 4.6 × 4.6 μm), 53.4 × 40.0 mm, 16 bit	64–12800		60 min to 1/2000 s	Flash usable at all shutter speeds	3''	CFast card, SD card or tethered to Mac or PC	HD (1920 × 1080p); UHD/4K (3840 × 2160p)	USB 3.0 (5 Gbit/s) Type-C connector, Mini HDMI, Audio In/out
H6D-400C MS	Single-shot 100 MP; 4-shot 100 MP; 6-shot 400 MP	64–12800		60 min to 1/2000 s	Flash usable at all shutter speeds	3''	CFast card, SD card or tethered to Mac or PC	HD (1920 × 1080p); UHD/4K (3840 × 2160p)	USB 3.0 (5 Gbit/s) Type-C connector, Mini HDMI, Audio In/out

===== H6D-400c MS =====
This camera is a variant of the H6D-100c with the ability to shift the sensor by a sequence of full and half pixel movements in sync with multiple captures to improve both colour rendition and to extrapolate a higher resolution. This method, designated by the suffix MS, i.e. "Multi-shot", is commonly known as "pixel shifting"). However it is not a true 400 megapixel camera as the name might suggest.

==== X System ====
The X System is a line of relatively compact mirrorless interchangeable-lens cameras built around a 43.8×32.9 mm (1.72×1.30 in) medium format sensor; the same sensor size was adopted by Fujifilm for its GFX line, which competes with the X system. The first camera, the X1D, was announced in June 2016; it was followed by the X1D II 50C (June 2019) and the X2D 100c (September 2022). Also in 2019, Hasselblad introduced the CFV II 50C, an updated CFV-50c back which is compatible with V system cameras, using the same digital sensor as the X1D II 50C, alongside the 907X, a new modular body which is designed to accept the CFV and X system lenses. Likewise, the CFV 100C was released in 2024, using the same sensor as the X2D.

Along with the cameras, Hasselblad released a new "XCD" lens mount which is specifically designed for a smaller flange distance compared to the larger "HCD" lens mount. The company sells an additional adapter to mount HCD lenses onto XCD lens mounts while retaining autofocus capabilities. At the time of launch, two lenses were available, a 45mm and a 90mm option. As of July 2024, there are fifteen lenses available ranging from a 21mm focal length wide angle lens to a 135mm focal length short telephoto lens. Hasselblad also produces a single zoom lens with a focal length range of 35 to 75mm.

===== X1D-50c =====
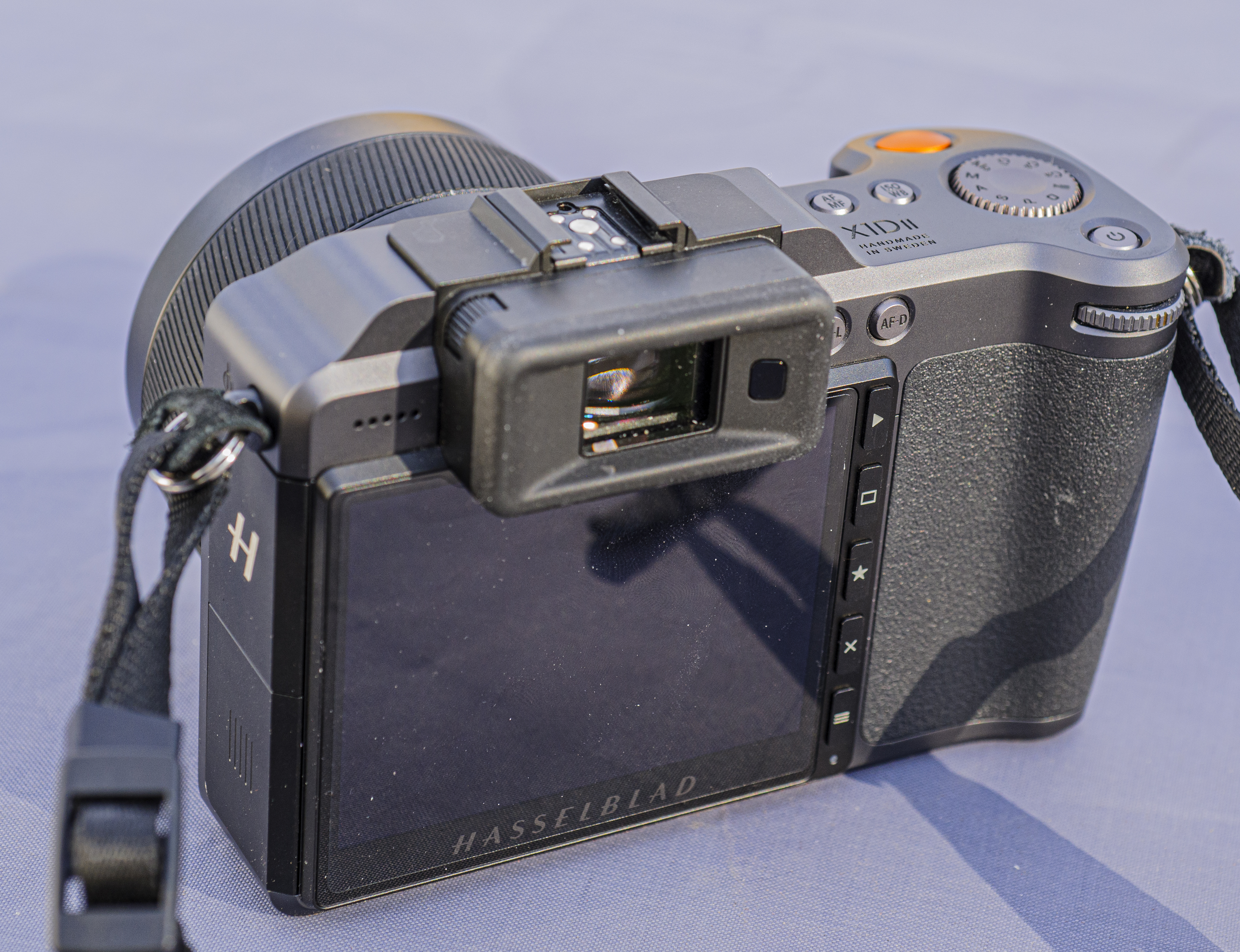
Hasselblad X1D II 50C with 45mm F4 P lens

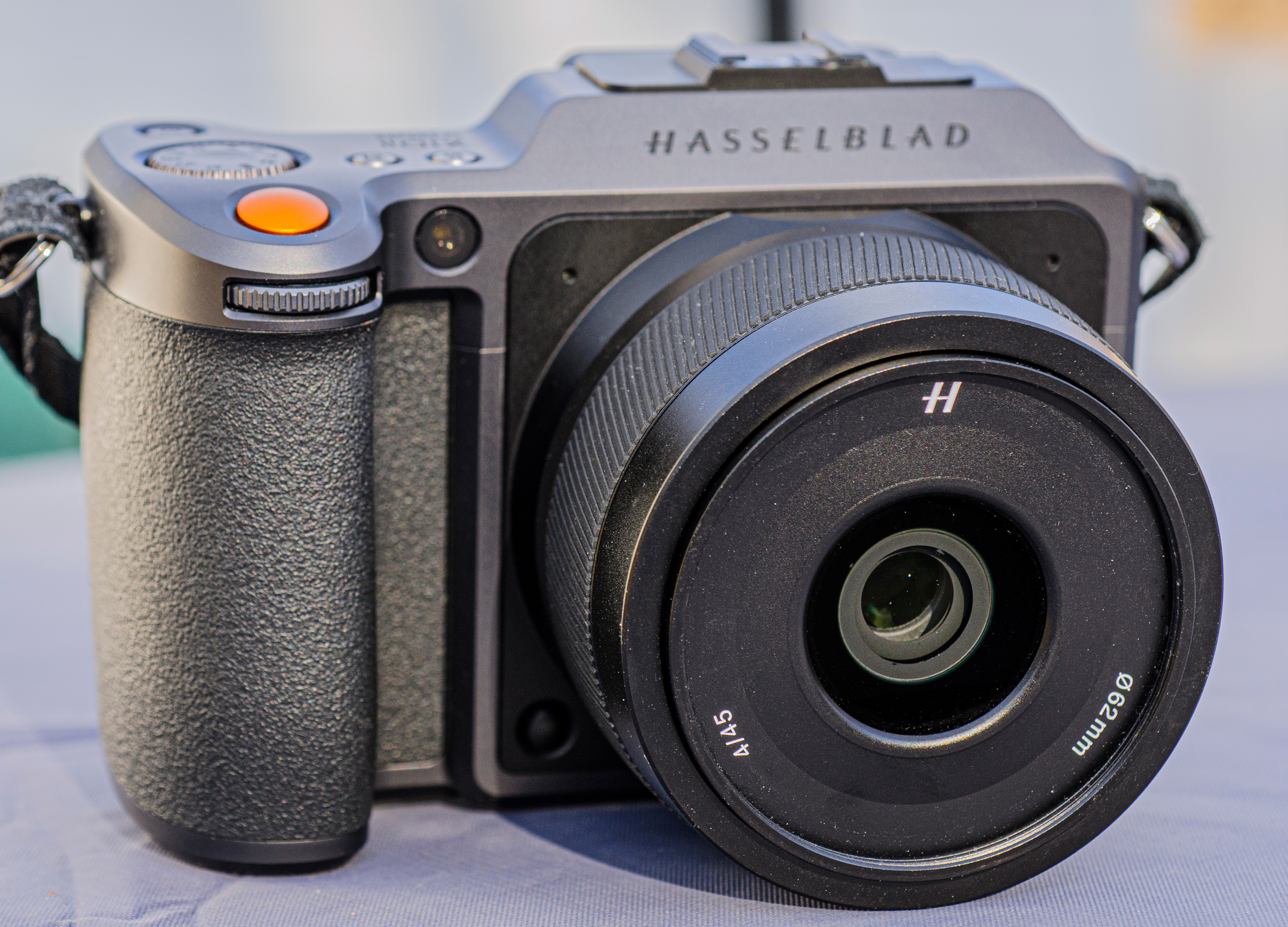
Hasselblad X1D II 50C with 45mm F4 P lens

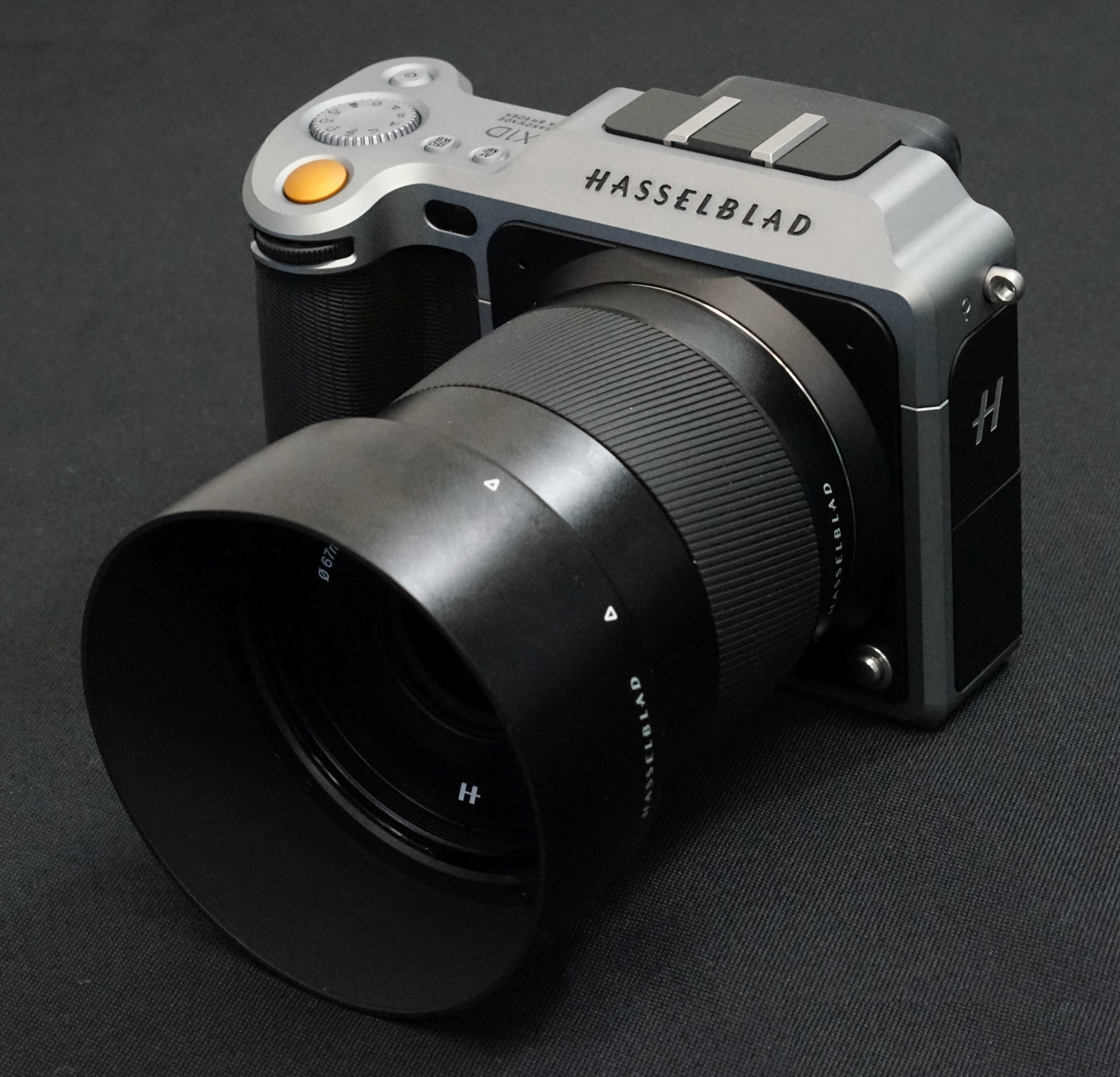
Preproduction Hasselblad X1D equipped with a 45mm lens

In June 2016, Hasselblad announced the X1D-50c, the first of a new line of medium format mirrorless cameras. The X1D is comparable in size to current full-frame digital SLRs, but is equipped with a 43.8 x 32.9 mm CMOS sensor. The camera uses a new XCD mount, with two lenses initially available for sale. At the same time, an H Mount adapter was announced, allowing H System Lenses to be used with full autofocus. Currently, there are fifteen XCD Lenses available. Hasselblad announced the X1D II 50C in June 2019, an upgraded variant of the original camera with the exact same sensor but faster electronics and a lower price point. The body color was changed from silver on the original X1D to a gunmetal color on the X1D II, and the grip material was changed as well.

Model	Sensor	ISO range	Capture speed	Shutter speed	Flash sync speed	Display	Storage	Video recording	Host connection type
X1D-50c	CMOS, 51 MP (8272 × 6200 pixels, 5.3 × 5.3 μm), 43.8 × 32.9 mm, 16 bit	100–25600	2.0 fps	60 min to 1/2000 s	Flash usable at all shutter speeds	3.0''	Dual SD/SDHC/SDXC	HD (1920 × 1080)	USB 3.0 (5 Gbit/s) Type-C connector, Mini HDMI, Audio In/out
X1D II 50C	CMOS, 51 MP (8272 × 6200 pixels, 5.3 × 5.3 μm), 43.8 × 32.9 mm	100–25600	2.7 fps	60 min to 1/2000 s	Flash usable at all shutter speeds	3.6"	Dual UHS-II SD	2.7K (2720 × 1530); HD (1920 × 1080)	USB 3.0 (5 Gbit/s) Type-C connector, Audio In/out

===== X2D 100C =====
Hasselblad launched the 100 megapixel X2D 100C in September 2022, with better AF, IBIS, a revised design and three new X system lenses. In 2024-09-19 with the Earth Explorer Limited Edition a special version was released in tundra brown limited to 1000 pieces.

=== Lenses ===
Hasselblad has marketed lenses made by several different manufacturers for its camera bodies, primarily designed and built by Carl Zeiss AG, but other lens manufacturers have included Fujifilm, Kodak, Rodenstock, and Schneider Kreuznach.

=== Scanners ===
When Hasselblad merged with Imacon in 2004, it acquired Imacon's existing range of Flextight scanners. In 2006, Hasselblad launched two additional Flextight models, the X1 and the X5.

- The X1 had the ability to scan positive/negative film at 6300 dpi optical resolution, and a 60 MB/minute scan speed.
- The X5 added A4 reflective scanning, a batch / slide feeder, active cooling to keep noise down, 8000 dpi optical resolution, and a 300 MB/minute scan speed.

=== Phocus (software) ===
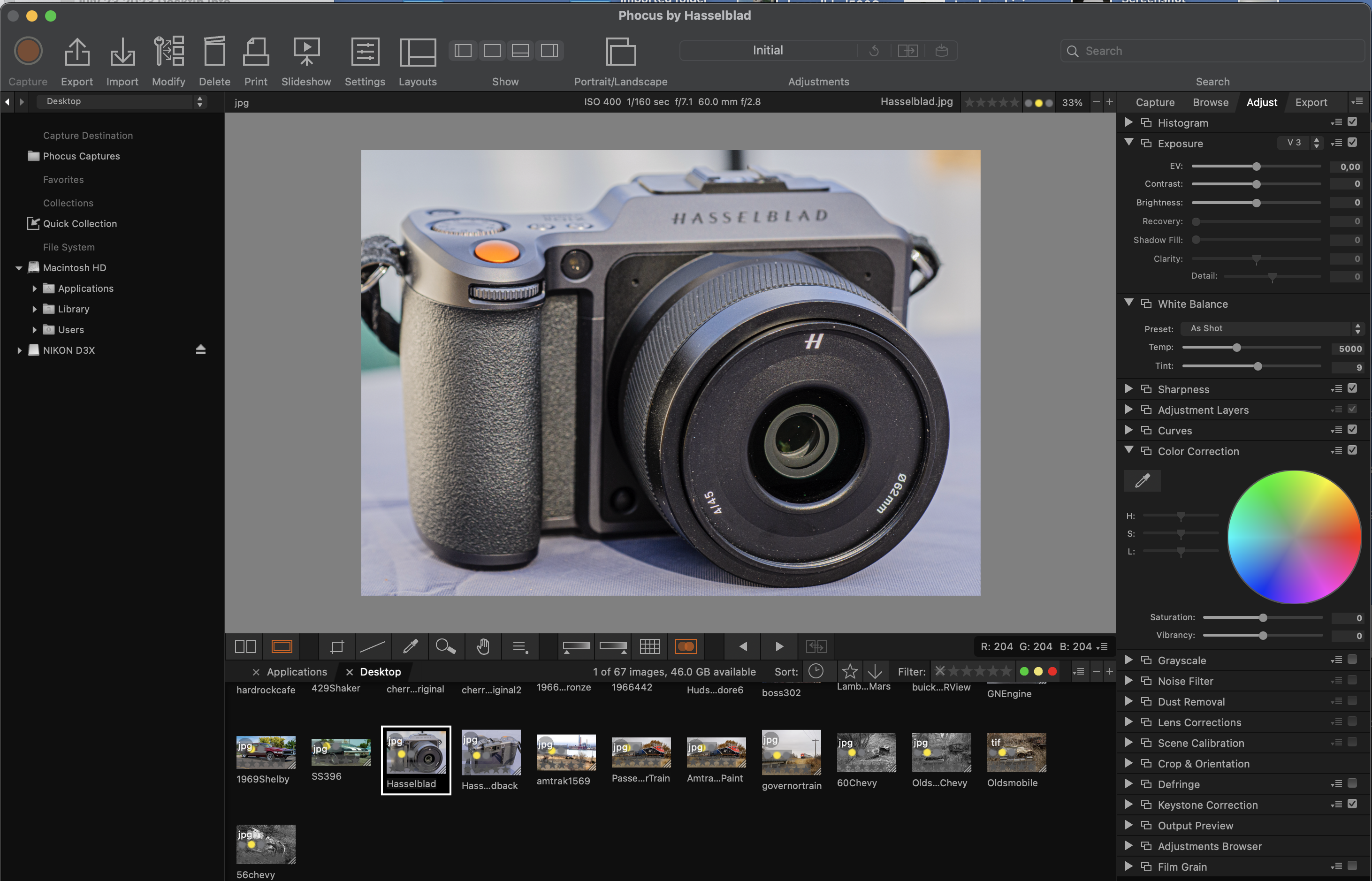
Phocus User Interface

Hasselblad also produces its own advanced image processing software called Phocus. The latest version of Phocus is available on Microsoft Windows and Mac OS X, and by taking advantage of the operating system's raw image format library, the Mac OS X version of Phocus supports raw image formats from other DSLR manufacturers. Phocus is available as a free download from the Hasselblad homepage.

In 2010, Hasselblad announced that future Windows versions of Phocus will not provide raw file support for 3rd-party cameras.

==== Phocus Mobile 2 ====
In June 2019, Hasselblad announced the new Phocus Mobile 2, enabling a more portable workflow via USB-C and Wi-Fi connection for the traveling photographer. With Phocus Mobile 2, users can import, edit and rate RAW images and import and rate full quality JPEG images directly on their iPad Pro or iPad Air 2019 model. In addition, Phocus Mobile 2 supports full quality image export, tethered shooting and direct camera control.

== Collaborations ==
=== Sony ===
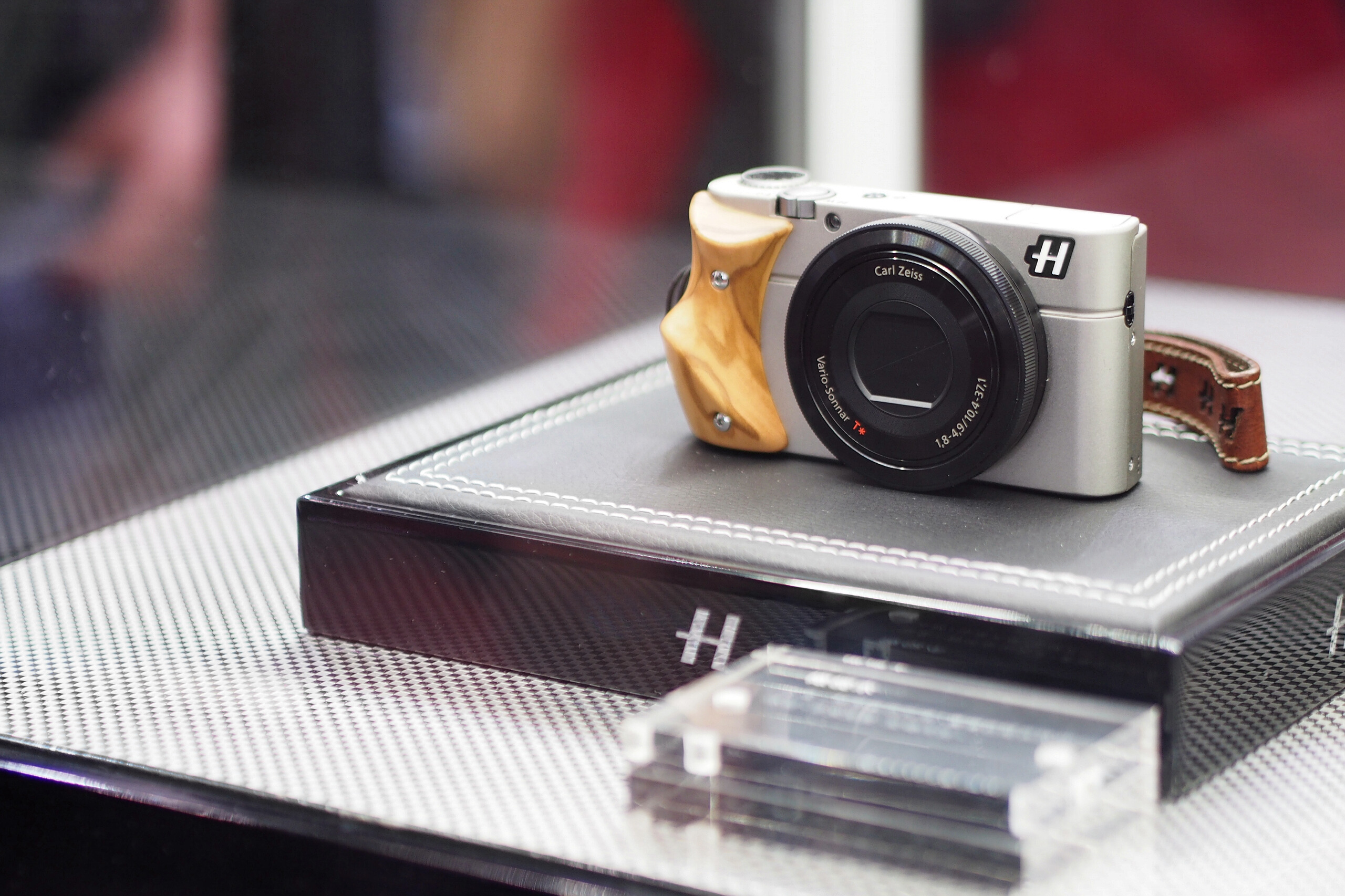
Hasselblad Stellar

In 2012 Hasselblad began marketing redesigned versions of Sony digital cameras.

At the 2012 photokina trade show in Germany, Hasselblad announced it would release a new mirrorless interchangeable-lens camera (MILC) using the Sony E-mount. The camera, called the Lunar, is based on the Sony NEX-7, including its 24.3 MP APS-C sensor, processing engine and user interface. The Lunar, which is marketed as an "ultimate luxury" model, was released in summer 2013.

On 23 July 2013 Hasselblad announced the Stellar, a "luxury" compact digital camera based on the Sony Cyber-shot DSC-RX100.

On 3 February 2014, Hasselblad introduced a restyled Sony α99 as the Hasselblad HV. According to the company's press-release, their version of the α99 is "tough as nails", featuring more robust construction than the original.

On 26 November 2014, Hasselblad announced the Stellar II based on the DSC-RX100M2. No further rebranded Sony products have been released by Hasselblad.

Unlike Leica in a similar partnership with Panasonic, Hasselblad did not make claims of reprogrammed image processing. The company, however, used the same marketing strategy, selling the OEM cameras under their brand at the prices two or three times higher than those of the original Sony cameras.

=== Mobile phones (OnePlus and Oppo) ===
Hasselblad partnerships for mobile phones

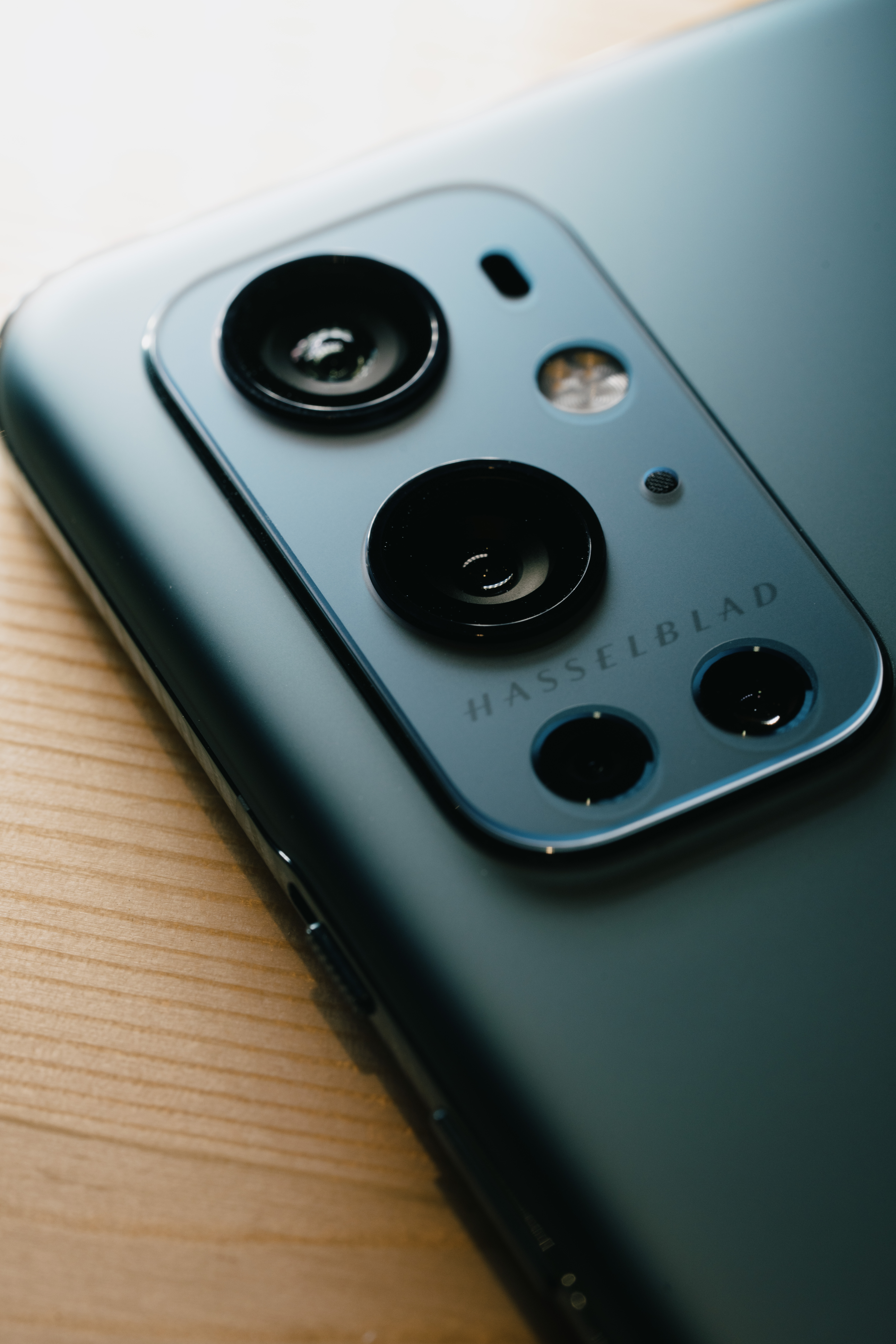
OnePlus 9 Pro module with Hasselblad camera

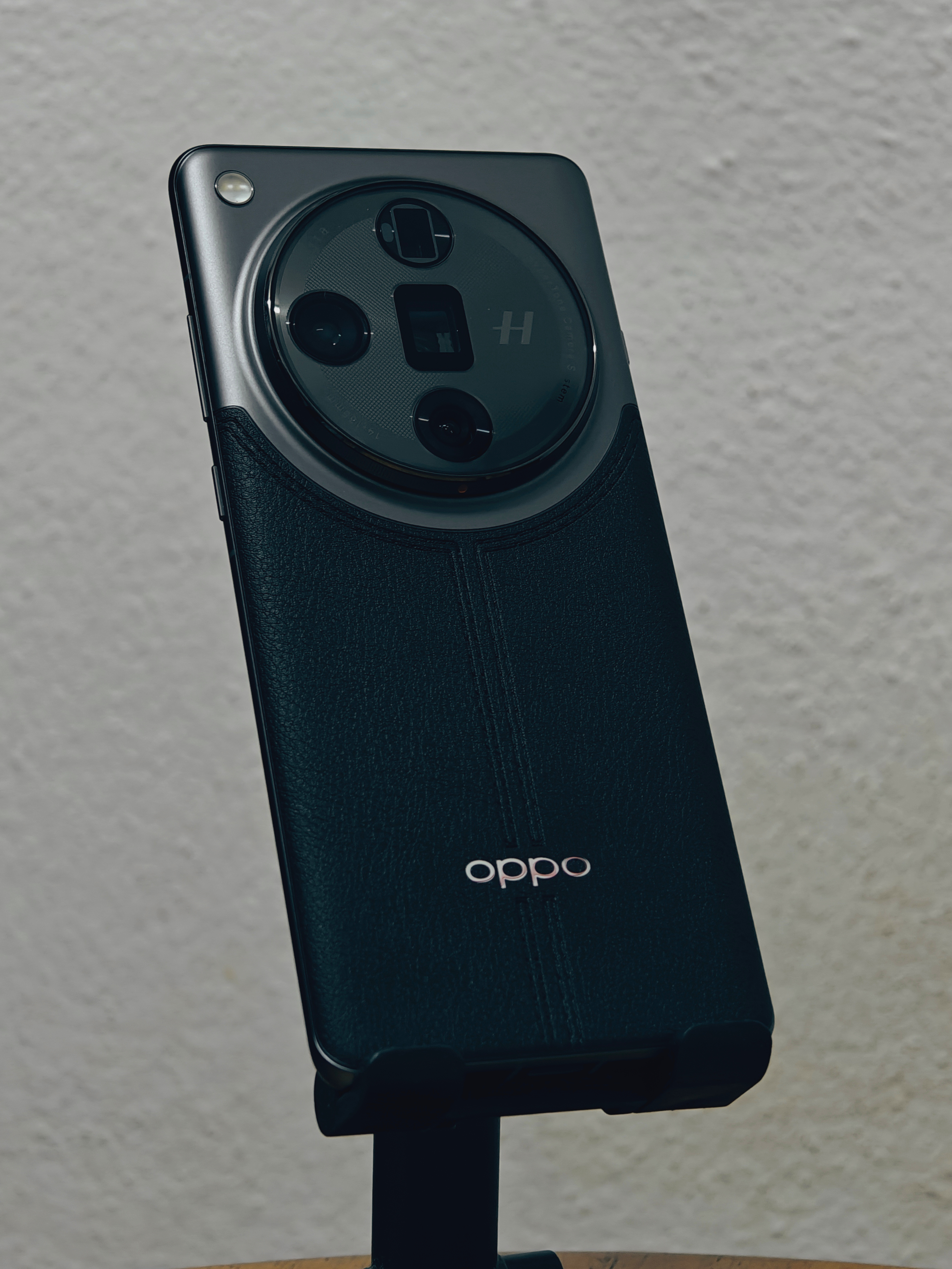
Oppo Find X7 features software-based tuning co-developed with Hasselblad.

On 8 March 2021, OnePlus announced a $150 million deal with Hasselblad to develop camera technology for OnePlus. The OnePlus 9 series are the first smartphones that included improved cameras made in partnership with Hasselblad.

In February 2022, Oppo announced a three-year partnership with Hasselblad, to co-develop industry-leading camera technologies for Oppo's flagship Find X series. The triple-camera 5G handset Oppo Find X5 uses Hasselblad technology for the first time on an Oppo device, followed by the series' successors the Oppo Find X6 and the Oppo Find X7.

== Company publications ==
Hasselblad published the Hasselblad Forum until 2007, and it was replaced by the new large-format journal, Victor. Victor is available online as PDF, but registration is required.

== See also ==
- Fujifilm Barcode System (supported by H1, H2, H2F, H3D)
- Hasselblad Award
- List of lenses for Hasselblad cameras
- List of photographic equipment makers
- List of Swedish companies
- Medium format

== Sources ==
- Nordin, Richard (2011). Hasselblad Compendium. Canada: Cloak Hill Communication. pp. 368 pp ill incl. DVD with supplemental material. ISBN 978-0-9869188-0-3.
- Nordin, Richard (1997). Hasselblad System Compendium. United Kingdom: Hove Books. pp. 286pp ill. ISBN 978-1-897802-10-6.
- Shell, Bob (1996). The Hasselblad System (Hove Systems Pro Guides). United Kingdom: Hove Books. pp. 208pp ill. ISBN 978-0-906447-77-2.
- Wildi, Ernst (2000). The Hasselblad Manual 5th Edition. Amsterdam: Focal Press. pp. 360pp ill. ISBN 0-240-80385-X.
