= Ektar =

Brand of negative film from Kodak

Ektar 100
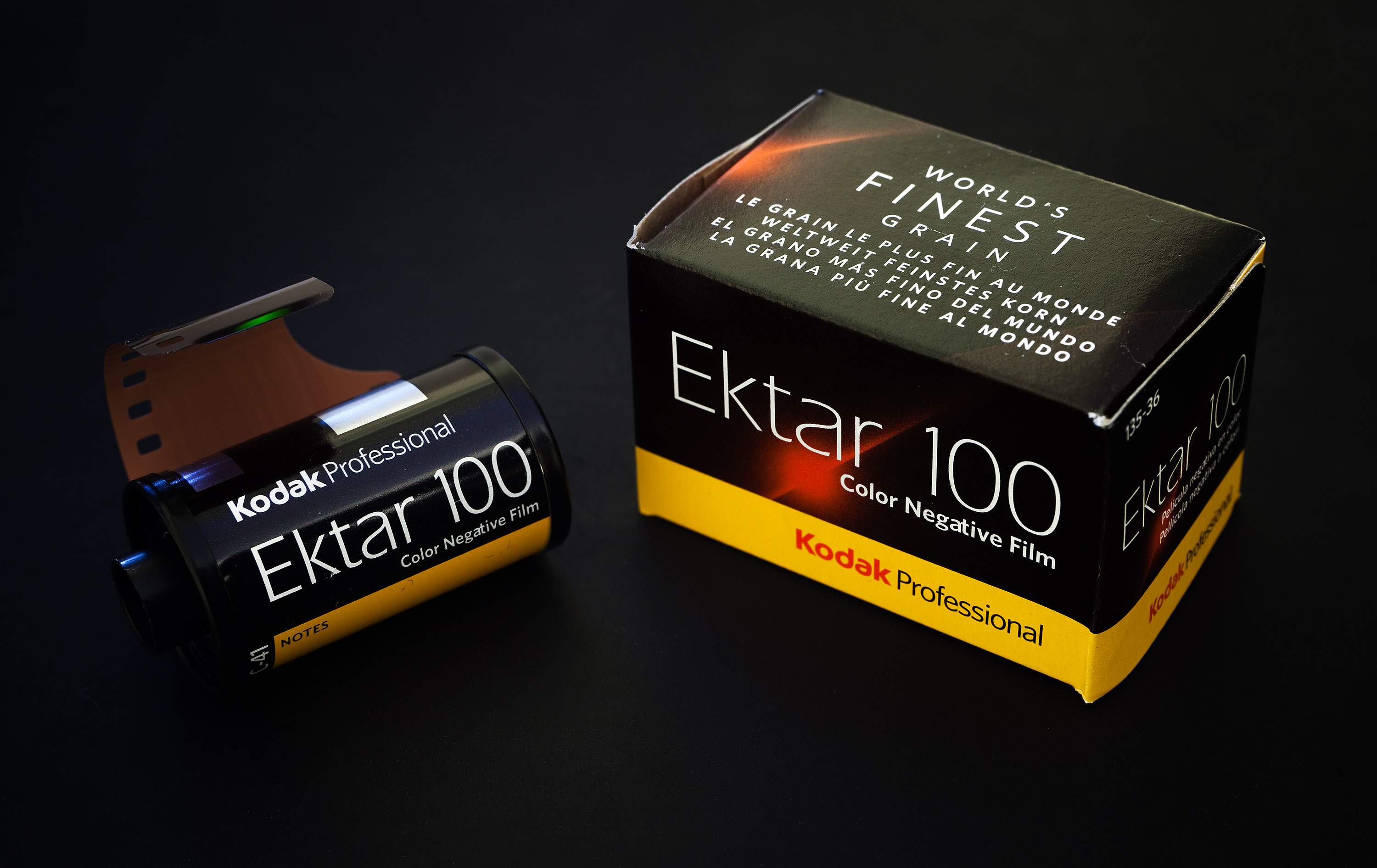
- Maker: Eastman Kodak
- Speed: 100/21°
- Type: Color print
- Process: C-41
- Format: 35mm, 120, 4x5, 8x10
- Grain: Ultra-fine
- Introduced: 2008, 2010(4x5/8x10)

Kodak Ektar is a professional color negative film introduced in 2008, designed for nature, outdoors, fashion, and product photography. The film offers ultra-fine grains, ultra-vivid colors, and high saturation, and is available in ISO 100 only.

Another film named "Ektar" was introduced in 1989 by Eastman Kodak as a semi-professional color negative film, but it was later discontinued and was replaced by Royal Gold.

Ektar
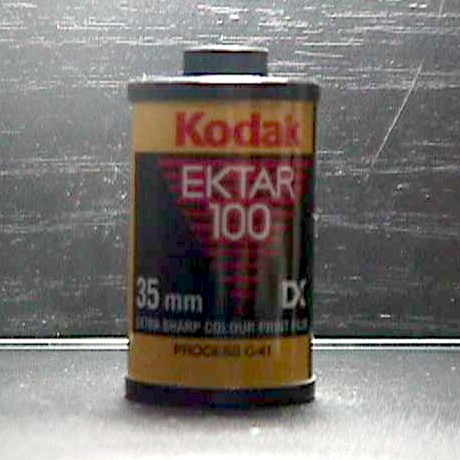
- Maker: Eastman Kodak
- Speed: 25/15°, 100/21°, 125/22°, 1000/31°, 400/27°
- Type: Color print
- Process: C-41
- Format: 35mm, 120
- Introduced: 1989
- Discontinued: 1994, 1997
- Replaced by: Royal Gold

== History ==
=== Use of name ===
Prior to its use on films, the Ektar name originally referred to Eastman Kodak's premium-priced lenses for professional use, which were introduced in 1936 and sold until the 1960s. In contrast to the branding from other lens-makers, Kodak emphasized that the name was a quality mark rather than referring to any particular optical formula.

=== Original Ektar film (1989 to 1997) ===
Ektar started as a color 35mm and 120 semi-professional film introduced by Eastman Kodak in 1989, which used the common C-41 process. It was designed to offer ultra-fine grain. It was manufactured in 25, 100 (replaced the poor selling 125 in June 1991), and 1000 ISO formats. 400 speed film was available until 1997. Poor market segmentation was cited as a factor in Kodak's decision to discontinue Ektar in 1994. The film was replaced by the Royal Gold line. The 120 version of Ektar was discontinued in 1997.

=== Relaunched Ektar 100 (2008 onwards) ===
A new film was introduced in September 2008 under the name Kodak EKTAR 100, which claims to be the finest-grain color negative film with high saturation and vivid colors available on the market. The film was initially only offered in 35mm, but later the film offering was expanded to include 120 size film, then 4x5 and 8x10 sheet sizes in 2010.

Ektar 100 is designed to be very suitable for digitizing using a film scanner.

== Example images ==
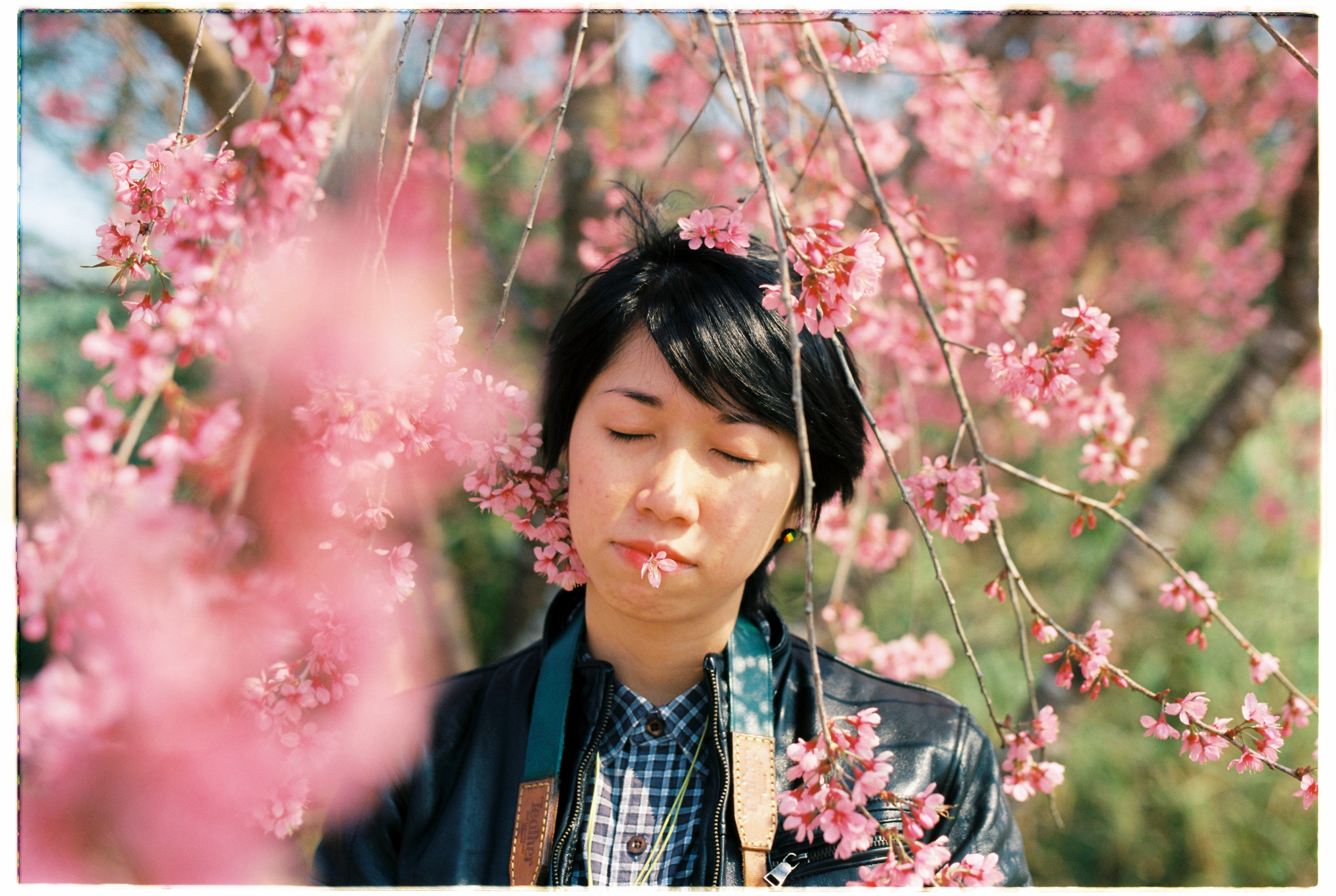
Nikon FM. Da Lat, Vietnam

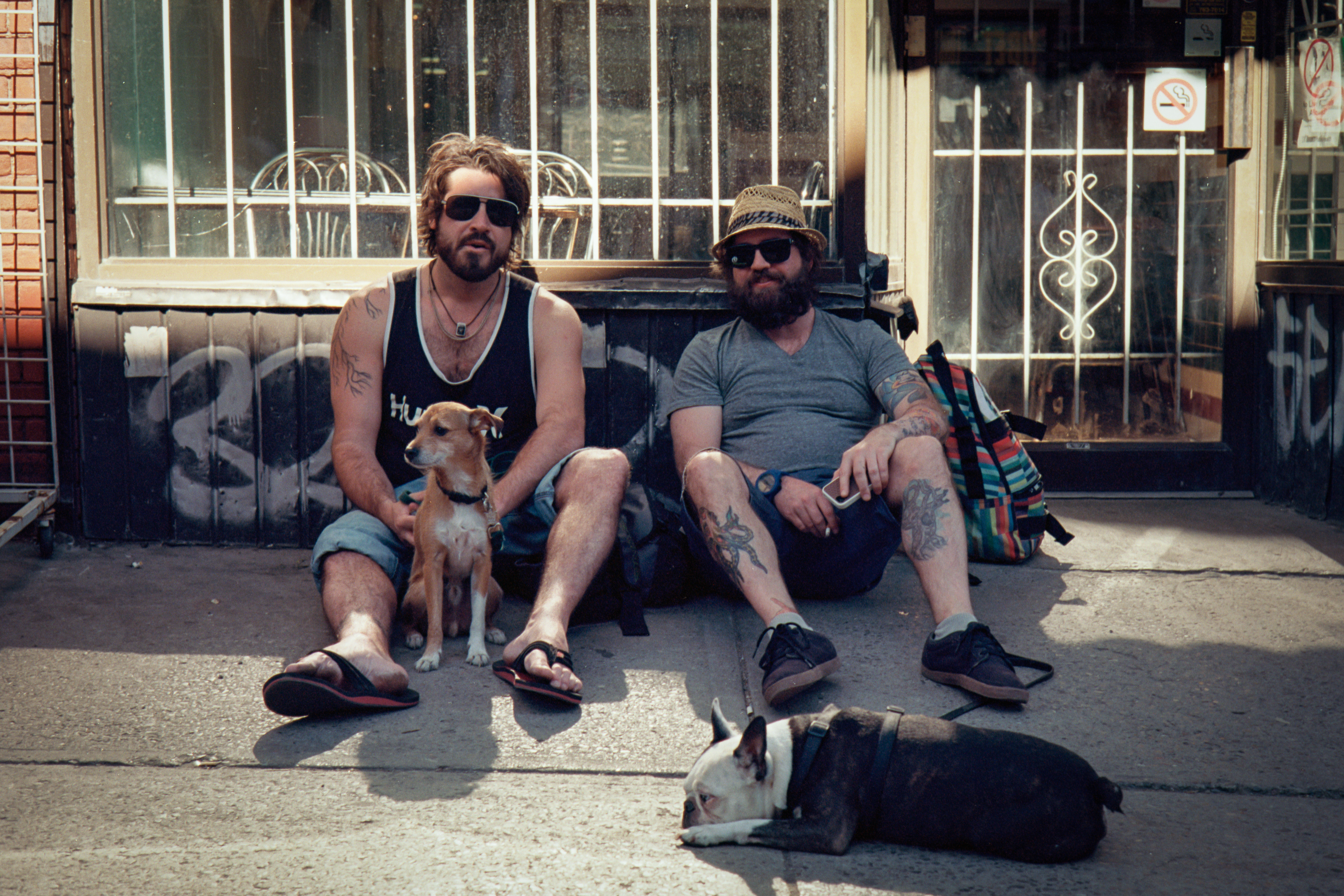
Carl Zeiss Ikon ZM, C Sonnar T* 1.5/50. ZM Kensington Market, Canada.

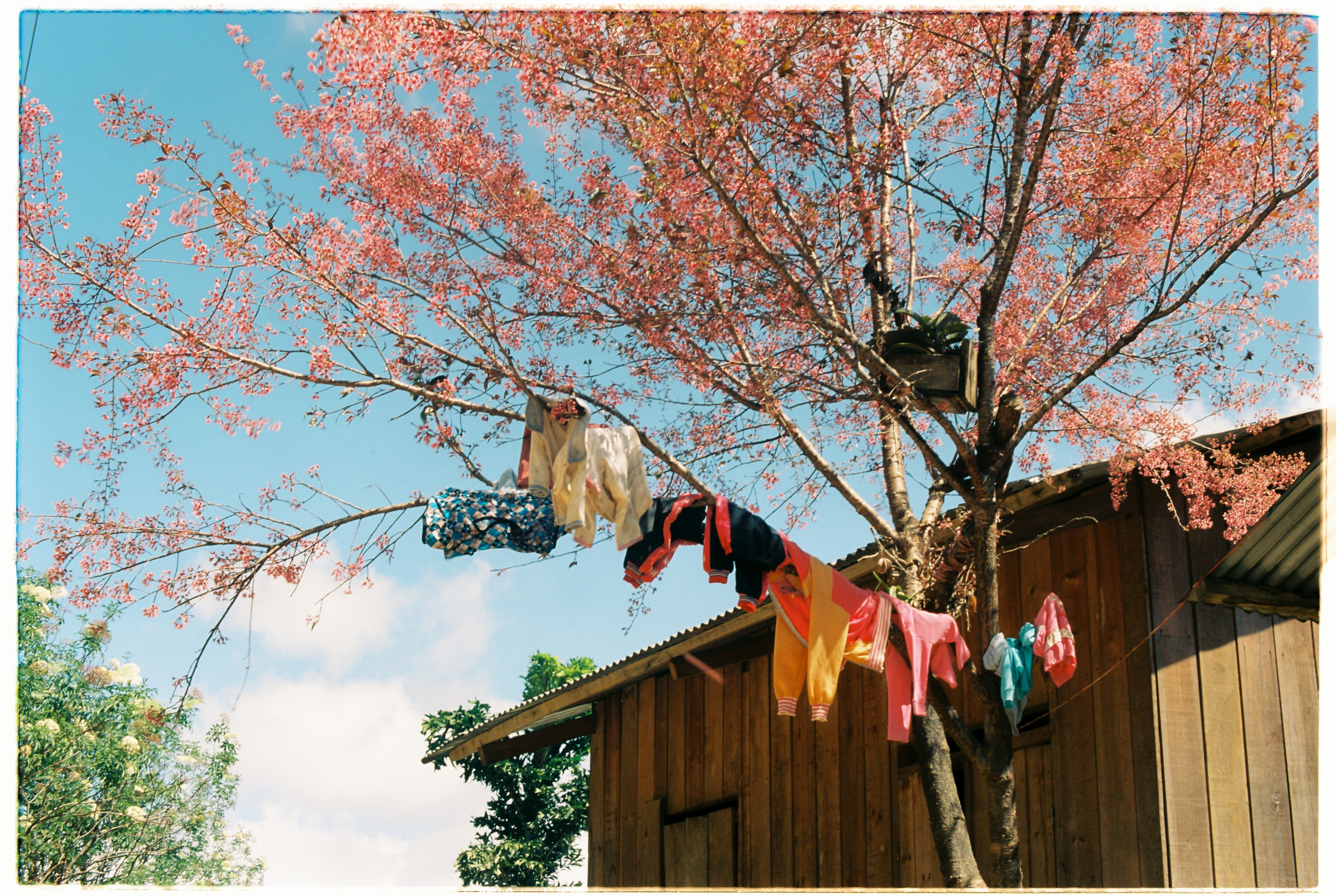
Nikon FM. Da Lat, Vietnam

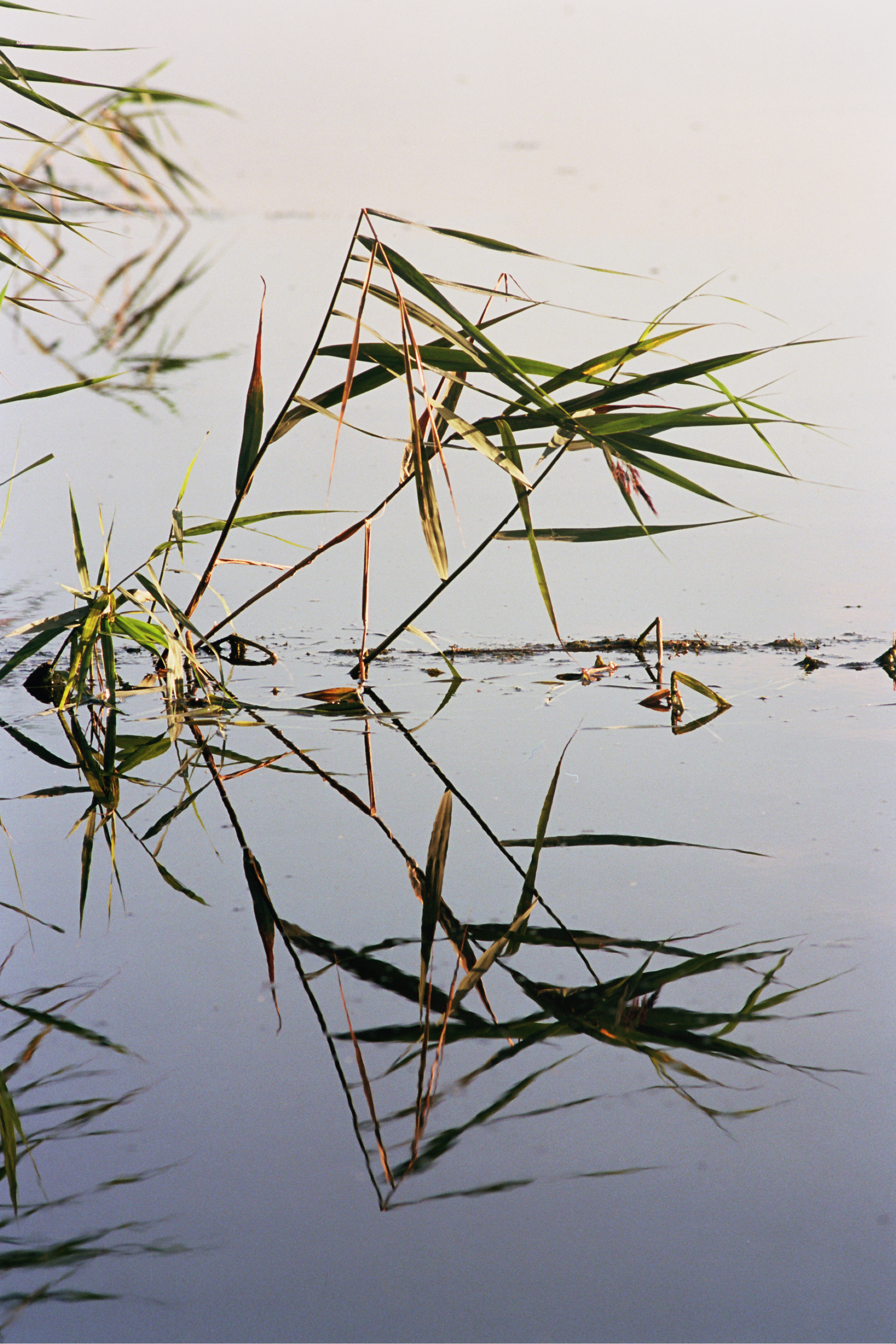
Canon A-1, 135mm f/3.5. River Great Ouse

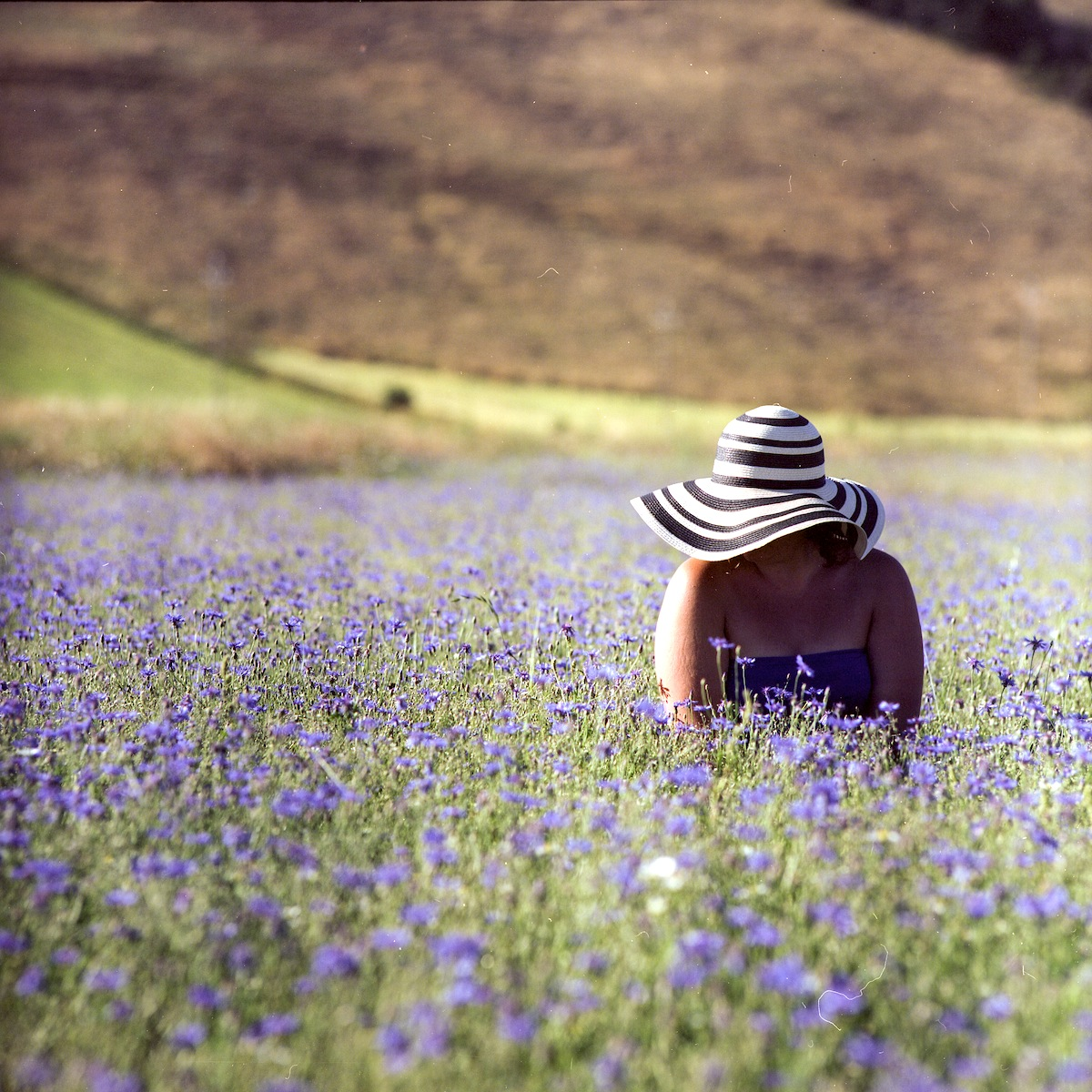
Pentacon Six TL Carl Zeiss. Jena Sonnar 180mm f2.8. Castelluccio di Norcia

== Ektar cameras ==
In 2022, the Ektar name was revived for a line of half-frame cameras designed and developed by Hong Kong-based Reto Production. The first model released that year was the Kodak Ektar H35 with an upgraded model H35N following in 2023.
