= Victor Hasselblad =

Swedish inventor and photographer

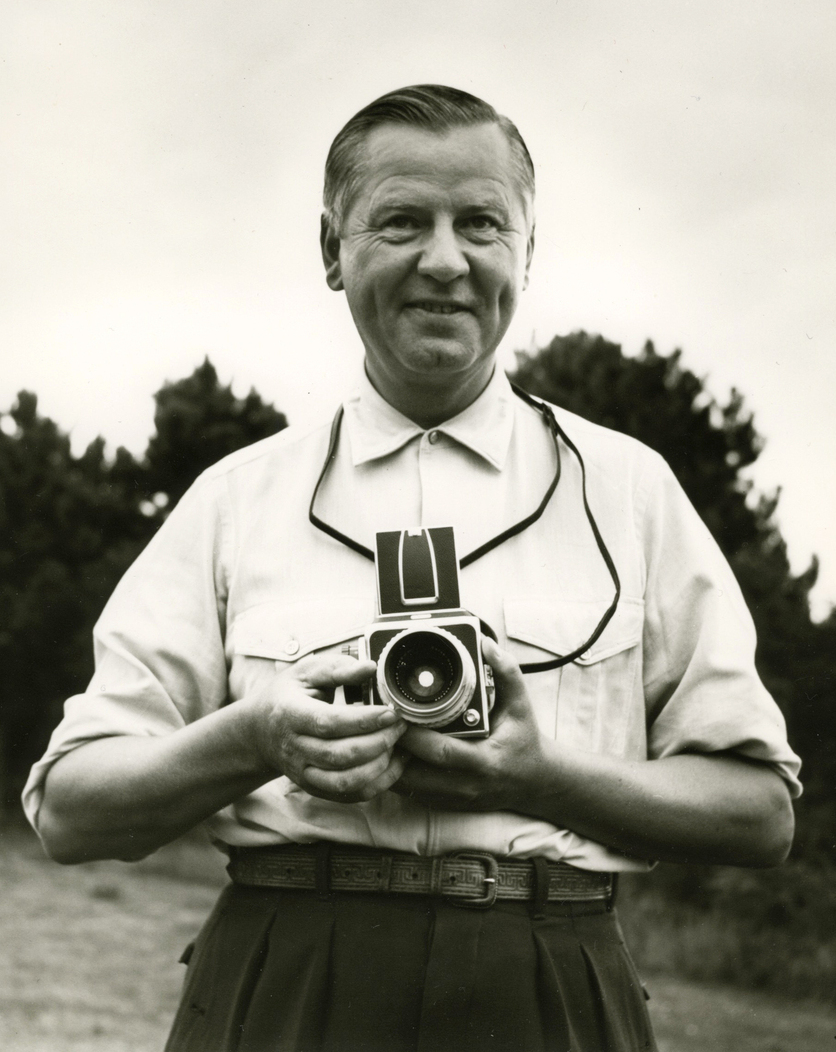
- Hasselblad in 1955
- Born: 8 March 1906; Gothenburg, Sweden
- Died: 5 August 1978 (aged 72); Sweden
- Occupations: Inventor, photographer

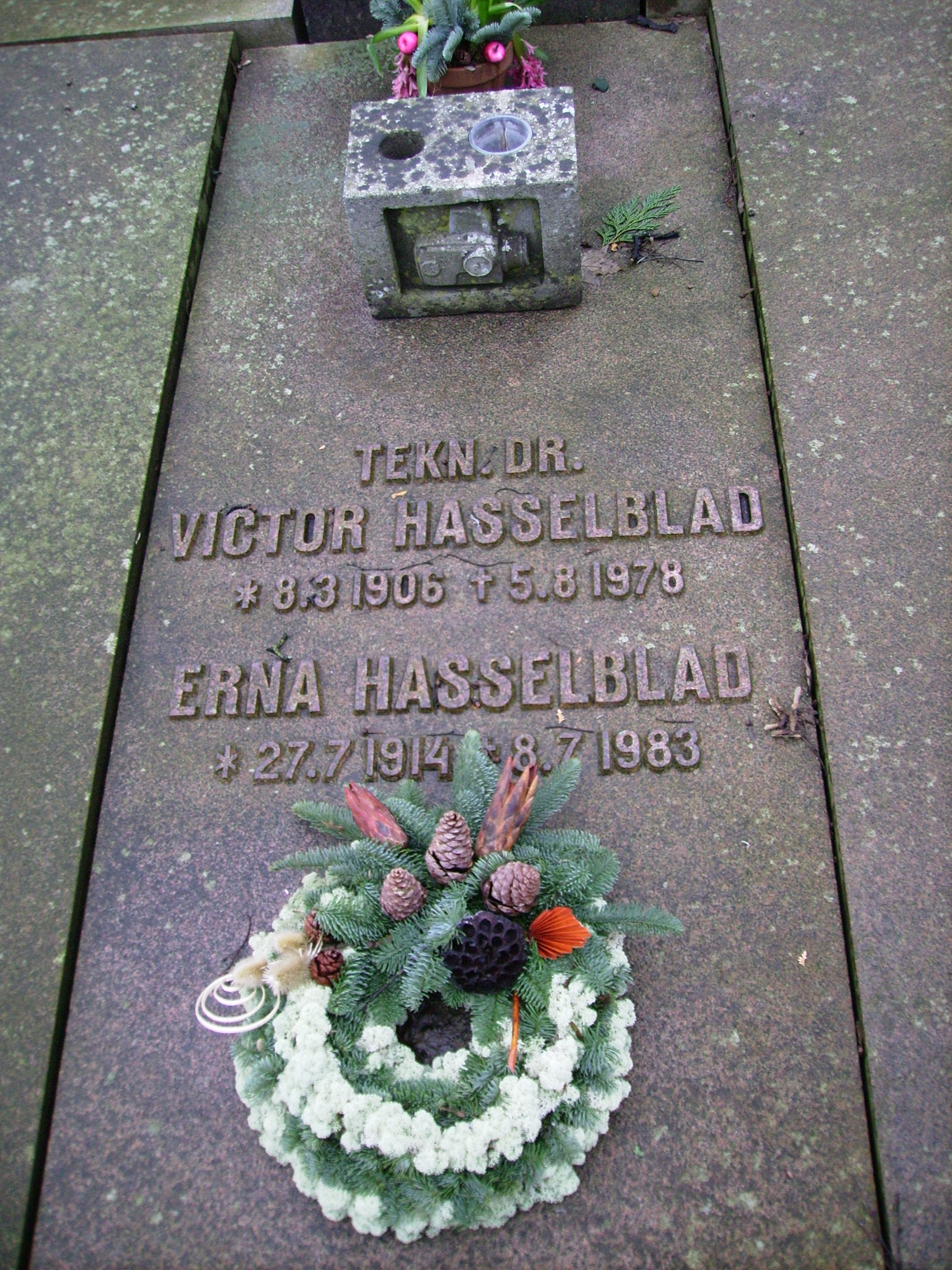
Victor Hasselblad's grave at Örgryte gamla kyrkogård in Gothenburg

Victor Hasselblad (8 March 1906 – 5 August 1978) was a Swedish inventor and photographer, known for inventing the Hasselblad 6x6 cm medium format camera.

== Life and work ==
Hasselblad was born in Gothenburg. In 1940 Swedish Air Force officers requested Hasselblad to construct a camera that rivaled the one found in a German reconnaissance aircraft shot down over Sweden. Hasselblad founded the Victor Hasselblad AB company in 1941 to produce cameras for the Swedish Air Force.

Hasselblad was famous for always trying out Hasselblad AB's new camera models by photographing birds. For example, Hasselblad 2000 was tried a week at Nidingen, the only place in Sweden where the black-legged kittiwake nests.

By 1948, the company introduced the first civilian Hasselblad camera, the 1600F, in New York City. Over time, Hasselblad has become a standard camera for many professional photographers.

On his death, Hasselblad willed SEK 78 million (US$8 million) to the Erna and Victor Hasselblad Foundation.

In 1980 Hasselblad was posthumously inducted into the International Photography Hall of Fame and Museum.
