= Bob Shell =

American photographer and author (born 1946)

Robert Edward Lee Shell (born December 3, 1946) is an American photographer and author who was convicted of involuntary manslaughter for the death of his model, Marion Franklin, in his Radford, Virginia studio. The events surrounding his case have focused attention on photographers' professional conduct, and boundary issues with their models.

== Photographic career ==
Bob Shell trained in zoology and, after college, worked for the Smithsonian Institution. He also studied fine art and worked as a natural history painter. His paintings and drawings were widely published and included wildlife conservation stamps for the National Wildlife Federation. His father was an avid photographer and cinematographer and Shell followed in his footsteps, learning photography and film making at an early age. In the 1970s Shell decided to change careers and began to pursue photography and writing. He wrote his first articles for Shutterbug magazine in 1973 and continued his association with that magazine, later becoming its editor, a position he held until 2003.

== Manslaughter conviction ==
Shell was known as a teacher of photography, and for his nude and erotic photography. In early 2003, he began a bondage-themed project with the intent of establishing a commercial website ("bound2bwild.com") and producing a bondage-themed book under his nom de plume Edward Lee. On June 3, 2003, his model (and, in his account, girlfriend) Marion Franklin died of a morphine overdose during a bondage-themed photographic session. Shell was prosecuted in connection with her death by Radford City Commonwealth's Attorney Chris Rehak.

After four years of delays punctuated by allegations of police and prosecutorial misconduct, Shell went to trial before a jury on August 20, 2007. Although the sequence of events surrounding Franklin's death was contentious, the jury agreed that Shell had administered the lethal dose of morphine to Franklin. On 31 August, Shell was convicted of involuntary manslaughter, and sentenced to 32 years and 6 months in prison. All his appeals have since failed.

== Publications ==
- The Canon EOS System. Hove Systems Pro Guides. Hove, East Sussex: Hove Foto, 1990. ISBN 0-906447-47-X.
- The Hasselblad System. Hove Systems Pro Guides. Hove Foto, 1991. ISBN 0-906447-77-1.
- Mamiya Medium Format Systems. Hove Systems Pro Guides. Hove, East Sussex: Hove Foto, 1992. ISBN 0-906447-76-3.
- Canon Compendium: Handbook of the Canon System. Hove, East Sussex: Hove, 1994. ISBN 1-897802-04-8.
- Canon Classic Cameras. Magic Lantern, 1995. ISBN 1-883403-26-X.
- (With Victoria Jordan Stone). The Complete Idiot's Guide to Massage Illustrated. Alpha, 2007. ISBN 1-59257-587-0.
