= Nan Goldin =

American photographer and activist

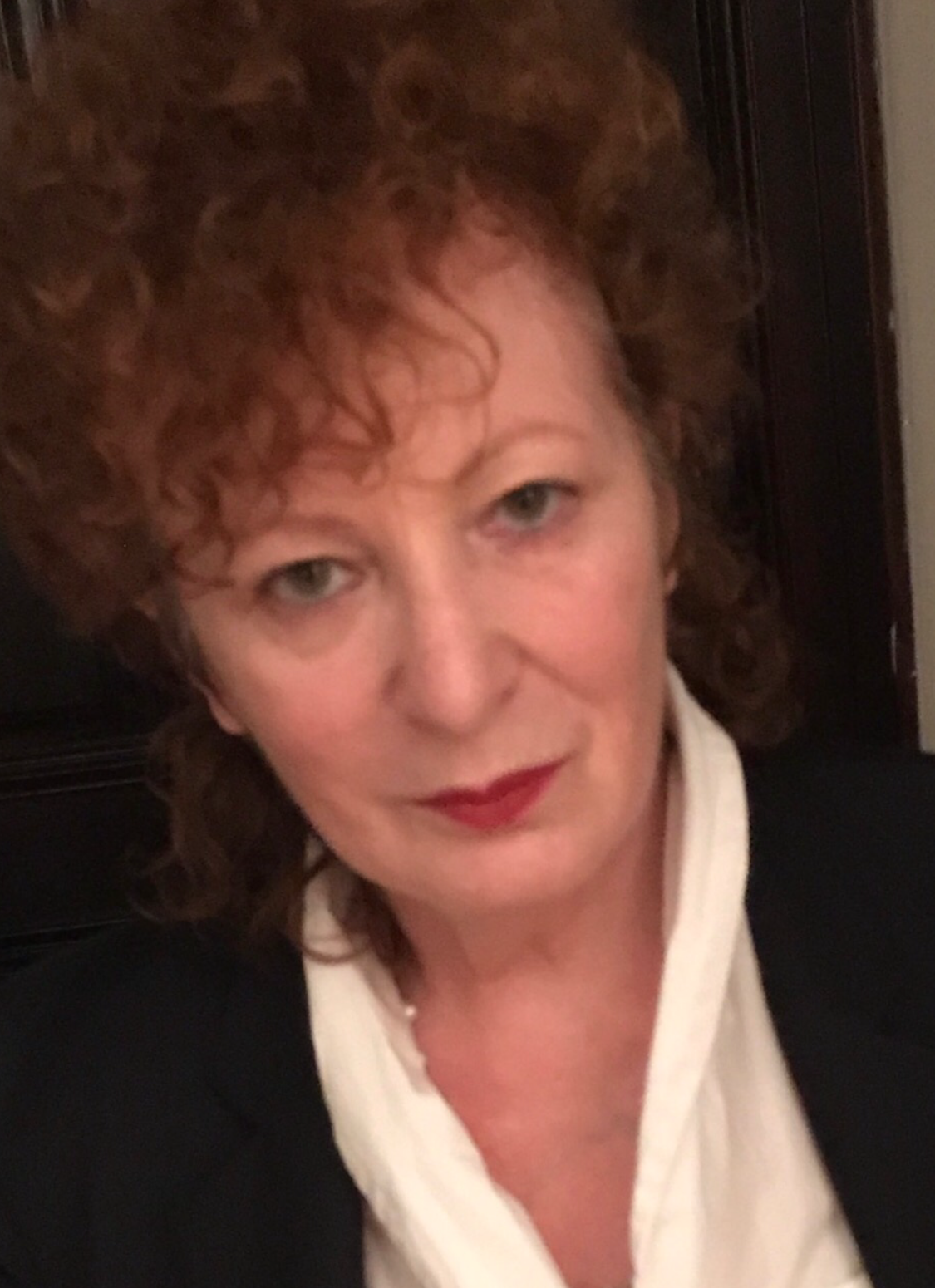
- Goldin in 2017
- Born: Nancy Goldin; 1953 (age 72–73); Washington, D.C., U.S.
- Known for: Photography
- Notable work: The Ballad of Sexual Dependency (1986)
- Awards: Edward MacDowell Medal; 2012 Hasselblad Award; 2007 Ordre des Arts et des Lettres; 2006

Nancy Goldin (born 1953) is an American photographer and activist. Her work explores in snapshot-style the emotions of the individual, in intimate relationships, and the bohemian LGBTQ subcultural communities, especially dealing with the devastating HIV/AIDS crisis of the 1980s. Her most notable work is The Ballad of Sexual Dependency. In the slideshow and monograph (1986) Goldin portrayed her chosen family, meanwhile documenting the post-punk and gay subcultures. She is a founding member of the advocacy group P.A.I.N. (Prescription Addiction Intervention Now) against the opioid epidemic. She lives and works in New York City.

== Early life ==
The Hug, NYC, 1980, Cibachrome print by Goldin

Goldin was born in Washington, D.C., in 1953 to middle-class Jewish parents, and grew up in the Boston suburb of Swampscott, moving to Lexington in her teens. In her teens, she attended St Clair High School where she stayed until she graduated. Goldin's father worked in broadcasting and served as the chief economist for the Federal Communications Commission. Goldin had early exposure to tense family relationships, as her parents often argued about Goldin's older sister Barbara who ultimately committed suicide when Goldin was 11: "This was in 1965, when teenage suicide was a taboo subject. I was very close to my sister and aware of some of the forces that led her to choose suicide. I saw the role that her sexuality and its repression played in her destruction. Because of the times, the early sixties, women who were angry and sexual were frightening, outside the range of acceptable behavior, beyond control. By the time she was eighteen, she saw that her only way to get out was to lie down on the tracks of the commuter train outside of Washington, D.C. It was an act of immense will."

Goldin began to smoke marijuana and date an older man. She left home by age 13 and subsequently lived in various foster homes. At 16 she enrolled at the Satya Community School in Lincoln, MA, that followed the educational concept of Summerhill. After Polaroid donated some cameras to the school, a staff member (existential psychologist Rollo May's daughter) introduced Goldin to photography in 1969 when she was sixteen years old. She got to be the school photographer and became "obsessed with recording my life". Still struggling from her sister's death, Goldin used the camera to cherish her relationships with those she photographed. At first she tried to emulate early as well as contemporary fashion photography by the likes of Guy Bourdin and Helmut Newton in French and Italian Vogue magazine issues she stole and then she and her peers would be occupied with for hours. Henry Horenstein, whose evening class at New England School of Photography Goldin attended, appreciated her pictures and showed her Larry Clark's book Tulsa that had just come out in 1971 and documented Clark's life within a group of "speedfreaks". It opened her eyes and shifted her focus from fashion to art photography. Through Horenstein Goldin also got to know the work of August Sander and Lisette Model (Goldin attended a class by her in 1974). She finally enrolled at the School of the Museum of Fine Arts, Boston with her friend from Satya, David Armstrong. There she met Philip-Lorca diCorcia and Mark Morrisroe, and began to photograph in color.

== Life and work ==
Goldin's first solo show, held in Boston in 1973, was based on her photographic journeys among the city's gay and transgender communities, to which she had been introduced by her friend David Armstrong. While living in downtown Boston at age 18, Goldin "fell in with the drag queens," living with them and photographing them. Among her work from this period is Ivy wearing a fall, Boston (1973). Unlike some photographers who were interested in psychoanalyzing or exposing the queens, Goldin admired and respected their sexuality. Goldin said, "My desire was to show them as a third gender, as another sexual option, a gender option. And to show them with a lot of respect and love, to kind of glorify them because I really admire people who can re-create themselves and manifest their fantasies publicly. I think it's brave".

Goldin admitted to being romantically in love with a queen during this period of her life in a Q&A with Bomb "I remember going through a psychology book trying to find something about it when I was nineteen. There was one little chapter about it in an abnormal psych book that made it sound so ... I don't know what they ascribed it to, but it was so bizarre. And that's where I was at that time in my life".

Goldin describes her life as having been completely immersed in that of the queens. "I lived with them; it was my whole focus. Everything I did – that's who I was all the time. And that's who I wanted to be". However, upon attending the School of the Museum of Fine Arts, Boston, when her professors told her to go back and photograph queens again, Goldin admitted her work was not the same as when she had lived with them. Goldin graduated from the School of the Museum of Fine Arts in 1977/1978, where she had worked mostly with Cibachrome prints, but also had begun showing slides. Her work from this period is associated with the Boston School of Photography.

Following graduation, Goldin moved to New York City. She began documenting the post-punk new-wave music scene, along with the city's vibrant, post-Stonewall gay subculture of the late 1970s and early 1980s. Her first slideshow in New York was at the birthday party of Frank Zappa at the Mudd Club, with her boyfriend acting as deejay, while on another occasion a live band (the Del Byzanteens featuring Jim Jarmusch) accompanied the screening. A first exposure to a wider audience was her participation in the 1981 exhibition New York/New Wave at PS1.

=== The Ballad of Sexual Dependency ===
In the young, sex-affirmative, hard-drug subculture of the Bowery neighborhood she found her "tribe," which became the subject of her photographs taken between 1979 and 1986. These pictures constitute her slideshow The Ballad of Sexual Dependency, which she initially showed to her peers in clubs and other venues they frequented. Their immediate reaction to the pictures shaped its constantly evolving form. Later versions of the cycle had around 700 images screened in about 45 minutes (ca. 3 seconds per slide). After the slideshow was screened at the Whitney Biennial in 1985, it was published as a book a year later by Aperture with help from Marvin Heiferman, Mark Holborn, and her friend Suzanne Fletcher. Taken from a song in Bertolt Brecht's Threepenny Opera, which served as opener for the slideshow, the title printed on flyers and posters for the events was originally an undefined plural, Ballads of Sexual Dependency, referring to the slideshow's deejayed soundtrack with songs by The Velvet Underground, Screamin' Jay Hawkins, Yoko Ono ("She Fights Back"), Petula Clark ("Downtown"), Dionne Warwick ("Don't Make Me Over"), Dean Martin ("Memories"), Nina Simone, chansons by Boris Vian ("Fais-moi mal, Johnny"), Charles Aznavour and Edith Piaf, arias sung by Maria Callas a. o. The book's 125 pictures were sequenced in a similar way with song titles.

The snapshot aesthetic images were dominantly taken indoors and by night: "That series is stark. It's all flash-lit. I honestly didn't know about natural light then and how it affected the colour of the skin because I never went out in daylight." They depict autobiographical moments, mostly of friends, women and men for themselves and couples, often nude, some casual, some explicit, but also a small spread with kids and groups of people partying; they show love, joy and confidence, but also vulnerability, tears and the result of violence, especially an incident at the end of her intense relationship with Brian, who is subject of many images as well as on the book cover. Her self-portrait, "Nan One Month After Being Battered, 1984", was called the center-piece of the Ballad. In her foreword to the book she describes it as a "diary [she] lets people read" of people she referred to as her "tribe". Part of Ballad was driven by the need to remember her chosen family. Photography was a way for her to hold onto her friends, she hoped.

=== After the Ballad ===
The photographs show a transition through Goldin's travels and her life. Most of her Ballad subjects were dead by the 1990s, lost either to drug overdose or AIDS; this tally included close friends and often-photographed subjects Greer Lankton and Cookie Mueller. In 1989, six days after Mueller's death, Goldin's show "Witnesses: Against Our Vanishing" opened in New York. The series was a multi-artist show at Artists Space. The show dealt frankly with issues related to living and dying with HIV/AIDS. On its opening night, demonstrators protested against censorship outside.

Goldin exhibited a series of cibachrome prints of Mueller in 1990. Pace/MacGill published the series as a book the same year.

In 2003, The New York Times nodded to the work's impact, explaining Goldin had "forged a genre, with photography as influential as any in the last twenty years." In addition to the Ballad, she combined her Bowery pictures in two other series: I'll Be Your Mirror and All by Myself.

Beside the Ballad, Goldin's work series are most often presented in the form of a slideshow, and have been shown at galleries, museums, photo and film festivals. The main themes of her early pictures are love, gender, domesticity, and sexuality. She has affectionately documented women looking in mirrors, girls in bathrooms and barrooms, drag queens, sexual acts, and the culture of obsession and dependency. In the book Auto-Focus, her photographs are described as a way to "learn the stories and intimate details of those closest to her". The book speaks of her uncompromising manner and style when photographing acts such as drug use, sex, violence, arguments, and traveling and references one of Goldin's photographs "Nan One Month After Being Battered, 1984" as an iconic image which she uses to reclaim her identity and her life.

Goldin's work since 1995 has included a wide array of subject matter: a collaborative book project with Japanese photographer Nobuyoshi Araki; New York City skylines and uncanny landscapes; people (notably in water) and her lover, Siobhan; and babies, parenthood and family life.

In 2000, her hand was injured and she currently retains less ability to handle a camera.

Christmas at The Other Side, Boston, 1972, by Goldin

In 2006, her exhibition, Chasing a Ghost, opened in New York. It was the first installation by her to include moving pictures, a fully narrative score, and voiceover, and included the three-screen slide and video presentation Sisters, Saints, & Sybils, which premiered in Paris the year before. The work involved her sister Barbara's suicide and how she coped through production of numerous images and narratives. Her works are developing more and more into cinemaesque features, exemplifying her gravitation towards working with films.

After some time, her photos moved from portrayals of dangerous youthful abandonment to scenes of parenthood and family life in progressively worldwide settings. Goldin currently resides and works in New York, Paris, as well as London.

== Fashion ==
Goldin has undertaken commercial fashion photography—for Australian label Scanlan & Theodore's Spring/Summer 2010 campaign, shot with model Erin Wasson; for Italian luxury label Bottega Veneta's Spring/Summer 2010 campaign with models Sean O'Pry and Anya Kazakova, evoking memories of her Ballad of Sexual Dependency; for shoemaker Jimmy Choo in 2011 with model Linda Vojtova; for Dior in 2013, featuring Robert Pattinson; for Gucci in 2024, featuring Debbie Harry and Kelsey Lu, among others; and for Acne Studios in 2026, featuring Juliette Lewis.

In March 2018, clothing brand Supreme released a collaborative range with Goldin as part of their Spring/Summer 2018 collection. This consisted of jackets, sweatshirts and t-shirts in various colors, with designs titled "Misty and Jimmy Paulette", "Kim in Rhinestone" and "Nan as a dominatrix".

== Critique ==
Some critics have accused Goldin of making heroin use appear glamorous and of pioneering a grunge style that later became popularized by youth fashion magazines such as The Face and I-D. However, in a 2002 interview with The Observer, Goldin herself called the use of "heroin chic" to sell clothes and perfumes "reprehensible and evil." Goldin admits to having a romanticized image of drug culture at a young age, but she soon saw the error in this ideal: "I had a totally romantic notion of being a junkie. I wanted to be one." Goldin's substance usage stopped after she became intrigued with the idea of memory in her work, "When people talk about the immediacy in my work, that's what its about: this need to remember and record every single thing."

Goldin's interest in drugs stemmed from a sort of rebellion against parental guidance that parallels her decision to run away from home at a young age, "I wanted to get high from a really early age. I wanted to be a junkie. That's what intrigues me. Part was the Velvet Underground and the Beats and all that stuff. But, really, I wanted to be as different from my mother as I could and define myself as far as possible from the suburban life I was brought up in."

Goldin denies the role of voyeur; she is instead a queer insider sharing the same experiences as her subjects: "I'm not crashing; this is my party. This is my family, my history." She insists her subjects have veto power over what she exhibits. In Fantastic Tales Liz Kotz criticizes Goldin's claim that she is just as much a part of what she is photographing rather than exploiting her subjects. Goldin's insistence on intimacy between artist and subject is an attempt to relegitimize the codes and conventions of social documentary, presumably by ridding them of their problematic enmeshment with the histories of social surveillance and coercion, says Kotz. [Her] insider status does nothing to alter the way her pictures convert her audience into voyeurs.

Goldin's The Ballad of Sexual Dependency critiques gender norms ("clichés" as she calls them) by highlighting the collective human desire to form connections regardless of the emotional or physical cost. Throughout Ballad, Goldin showcases some difficult moments for both herself and her friends, especially in relation to their codependency in search of genuine connection. Her friends are a diverse cast consisting of many non-conforming gender identities and sexualities; Goldin's photography exposes many narratives that most would turn a blind eye to, such as the intense intimacy and pain of same-sex relationships. The AIDS epidemic cost most of Goldin's friends their lives, now preserved in time through the photos that she captured of them. Throughout this period of loss, the desire for connection was further perpetuated and Goldin and her remaining friend group found it essential to remain in close contact with one another. This constant desire for intimacy and connection highlights the similarities amongst people, despite their more obvious differences, emphasizing the societally upheld "differences" between men and women.

== Influences ==
Her friends and colleagues Peter Hujar, Larry Clark, and David Wojnarowicz, as well as historical figures like August Sander and Claude Cahun were all major influences to Goldin's work, as was her lifelong friendship with the photographer David Armstrong.

=== Diane Arbus ===
Both Goldin and Diane Arbus celebrate those who live marginal lives. Stills from Variety are compared to Arbus' magazine work; the Variety series portray "the rich collision of music, club life, and art production of the Lower East Side pre and post AIDS period". Both artists ask to reexamine artists' intentionality.

=== Michelangelo Antonioni ===
One of the reasons Goldin began photographing was Michelangelo Antonioni's Blow Up (1966). The sexuality and glamour of the film exerted a "huge effect" on her. Referring to images shown in Ballad, "the beaten down and beaten up personages, with their gritty, disheveled miens, which populate these early pictures, often photographed in the dark and dank, ramshackle interiors, relate physically and emotionally to the alienated and marginal character types that attracted Antonioni."

=== Larry Clark ===
The youths in Larry Clark's Tulsa (1971) presented a striking contrast to any wholesome, down-home stereotype of the heartland that captured the collective American imagination. He turned the camera on himself and his lowlife amphetamine-shooting board of hanger-ons. Goldin would adopt Clark's approach to image-making.

== Activism ==
=== Opioid crisis ===
In 2017, in a speech in Brazil, Goldin revealed she was recovering from opioid addiction, specifically to OxyContin, after being prescribed the drug after wrist surgery. She had sought treatment for her addiction and battled through rehab. This led to her setting up a campaign called Prescription Addiction Intervention Now (P.A.I.N.) pursuing social media activism directed against the Sackler family for their involvement in Purdue Pharma, manufacturers of OxyContin. Goldin has said the campaign attempts to contrast the philanthropic contributions of the Sackler family to art galleries, museums and universities with a lack of responsibility taken for the opioid crisis. Goldin became aware of the Sackler family in 2017.

In 2018, she organized a protest in the Sackler Wing's Temple of Dendur at The Metropolitan Museum of Art. The protest called for museums and other cultural institutions not to accept money from the Sackler family.

Also in 2018, she was one of several artists who participated in a $100 sale organized by Magnum Photos and Aperture to raise funds for Goldin's opioid awareness group P.A.I.N. (Prescription Addiction Intervention Now).

"I've started a group called P.A.I.N. to address the opioid crisis. We are a group of artists, activists and addicts that believe in direct action. We target the Sackler family, who manufactured and pushed OxyContin, through the museums and universities that carry their name. We speak for the 250,000 bodies that no longer can."

In February 2019, Goldin staged a protest at the Guggenheim Museum in New York over its acceptance of funding by the Sackler family.

She also said that she would withdraw from a retrospective exhibition of her work at the National Portrait Gallery in London if they did not turn down a gift of £1 million from the Sacklers. The gallery subsequently said it would not proceed with the donation.

Two days after the National Portrait Gallery statement, the Tate group of British art galleries (Tate Modern and Tate Britain in London, Tate St Ives and Tate Liverpool) announced it would no longer accept any gifts offered by members of the Sackler family, from whom it had received £4 million. Tate Modern had been planning to display its copy of Goldin's The Ballad of Sexual Dependency slideshow, for a year from April 15, 2019. Goldin had not discussed the show with Tate.

Goldin identified that Tate, which has received Sackler money, paid her for one of the ten copies of The Ballad of Sexual Dependency in 2015, when she was deeply addicted to OxyContin. She says she spent some of the money on buying black market OxyContin, as doctors would no longer prescribe her the drug.

In July 2019, Goldin and others from the group Prescription Addiction Intervention Now staged a protest in the fountain at the Louvre in Paris. The protest was to try to persuade the museum to change the name of its Sackler wing, which is made up of 12 rooms. In November that year, Goldin campaigned at the Victoria and Albert Museum, London.

=== Gaza war ===
"Anti-zionism has been totally conflated with antisemitism which is convenient for Israel. This has made the rise of real antisemitism more dangerous. Anti-zionism is weaponized to shut the mouth of anyone criticizing the violent actions of the Israeli government."- Nan Goldin at Rencontres d'Arles July 2025.

In October 2023, soon after the October 7 attacks, Goldin signed a letter on Artforum calling for an end to the Israeli bombing of the Gaza Strip, stating there was "ample evidence that we are witnessing the unfolding of a genocide," and "reject[ing] violence against all civilians." The letter received more than 8,000 signatures. It was criticized by pro-Israel activists for not mentioning Israelis who were killed by Hamas in the October 7 attacks.

In November 2023, during the Gaza war, hundreds of members and supporters of Jewish Voice for Peace–New York City (JVP-NYC) took part in a sit-in protest in front of New York's Statue of Liberty demanding a ceasefire in Gaza. Goldin addressed the demonstration, saying, "As long as the people of Gaza are screaming, we need to yell louder, no matter who attempts to silence us." Goldin also canceled a photo shoot with the New York Times Magazine due to concerns about The New York Times' reporting on the Gaza crisis, accusing the newspaper of complicity with Israel in its reporting and further questioning its handling of Palestinian perspectives.

Goldin was arrested on October 14, 2024, during a Jewish Voice for Peace protest in New York City. In September 2026, Goldin attended a protest ahead of a speech by Israeli prime minister Benjamin Netanyahu at the United Nations General Assembly.

== Recognition ==
In 2023, Goldin was described as the most influential person in the art world in ArtReview's "Power 100" list of influential people in art.

=== Awards ===
- 1989: Camera Austria Prize for Contemporary Photography, Graz, Austria
- 1991: Louis Comfort Tiffany Foundation Award, Cold Spring Harbor, Long Island
- 1991: DAAD Artists-in-Residence program, Berlin, Germany
- 2006: Ordre des Arts et des Lettres, France
- 2007: Hasselblad Award, Gothenburg, Sweden
- 2012: 53rd Edward MacDowell Medal, MacDowell Colony, Peterborough, New Hampshire, US.
- 2018: Royal Photographic Society Centenary Medal and Honorary Fellowship, London, UK
- 2022: Käthe-Kollwitz-Preis, Academy of Arts, Berlin, Germany
- 2025: Kering Women In Motion Award for Photography, Arles

=== Censorship case in Brazil ===
An exhibition of Goldin's work was censored in Brazil, two months before opening, due to its sexually explicit nature. The main reason was that some of the photographs contained children in bed with their parents, who are naked and caressing each other. In Brazil, there is a law that prohibits the image of minors associated with pornography. The sponsor of the exhibition, a cellphone company, claimed to be unaware of the content of Goldin's work and that there was a conflict between the work and its educational project. The curator of the Rio de Janeiro Museum of Modern Art changed the schedule to accommodate, in February 2012, the Goldin exhibition in Brazil.

== Collections ==
Sorted by state.

- National Gallery of Australia, Canberra, Australia
- Galerie Rudolfinum, Prague, Czech Republic
- Centre Pompidou, Paris, France
- Goetz Collection, Munich, Germany
- Castello di Rivoli Museum of Contemporary Art, Torino, Italy
- Astrup Fearnley Museum of Modern Art, Oslo, Norway
- Fotomuseum Winterthur, Switzerland
- Tate, London, UK

=== United States ===
- Museum of Fine Arts, Boston
- Art Institute of Chicago
- Museum of Contemporary Art Chicago
- J. Paul Getty Museum, Los Angeles
- Museum of Contemporary Art, Los Angeles
- Currier Museum of Art, Manchester, New Hampshire
- New York

- Solomon R. Guggenheim Museum
- The Jewish Museum
- Collection Lambert
- Metropolitan Museum of Art
- Museum of Modern Art

- San Francisco Museum of Modern Art
- National Gallery of Art, Washington, D. C.
- National Museum of Women in the Arts, Washington, D.C.

== Solo exhibitions ==
- 1987: The Ballad of Sexual Dependency, screening and exhibition, Rencontres d'Arles
- 1991: Cookie Mueller, Pace/MacGill Gallery, New York (catalogue)
- 1992: Getrennte Welten/Separate Worlds with Gundula Schulze, Kunst-Werke Berlin, curated by Klaus Biesenbach and Inge Herbert (small catalogue)
- 1993: Die andere Seite (The Other Side), DAAD Artists-in-Residence program, Berlin (book)
- 1995: The Golden Years, Yvon Lambert Gallery, Paris (catalogue)
- 1996: I'll Be Your Mirror, retrospective, Whitney Museum of American Art (book), and traveled to
  - Kunstmuseum Wolfsburg, Germany
  - Stedelijk Museum Amsterdam
  - Fotomuseum Winterthur, Switzerland
  - Kunsthalle Wien, Vienna
  - National Museum, Prague
- 1997: Rencontres d'Arles, 10 year anniversary of screening The Ballad of Sexual Dependency (Théâtre Antique)
- 1997: Love Streams, Yvon Lambert Gallery, Paris (catalogue)
- 2001: Le Feu Follet/The Devil's Playground, Centre Georges Pompidou, Paris (book), and traveled to
  - Whitechapel Gallery, London
  - Museo Nacional Centro de Arte Reina Sofía, Madrid
  - Serralves, Porto, Portugal
  - Privoli Castle, Turin
  - Ujazdów Castle, Warsaw.
- 2005: Fantastic Tales, Palmer Museum of Art, Pennsylvania State University (catalogue)
- 2005: Soeurs, Saintes et Sibylles, commissioned for the Chapelle St. Louis de la Salpêtrière at Festival d'automne, Paris; first installation with three screens and film (catalogue)
- 2006: Chasing a Ghost, Matthew Marks Gallery, New York
- 2007: Hasselblad Award, Hasselblad Center, Gothenburg (book)
- 2009: Rencontres d'Arles, Guest of honour, screening of The Ballad of Sexual Dependency with live music by The Tiger Lillies, slideshow and film installation Sisters, Saints and Sibyls (curates central show Nan's Guests)
- 2009: Poste Restante. Slide Shows/Grids, C/O Berlin
- 2010/11: Berlin Work. Fotografien 1984–2009, Berlinische Galerie
- 2010: Scopophilia, Louvre, Paris
  - 2011: Matthew Marks Gallery
- 2015: Diving for Pearls, Kestner Gesellschaft, Hannover (book)
- 2016/17: The Ballad of Sexual Dependency, MoMA, New York
- 2017: Weekend Plans, Irish Museum of Modern Art, Dublin, alongside exhibition by Vivienne Dick; showed some drawings and photographs taken in Ireland (catalogue and edition)
- 2019/20: Sirens, Marian Goodman Gallery, London
- 2022: Käthe-Kollwitz-Preis 2022: Nan Goldin, Akademie der Künste, Berlin (book)
- 2023/24: This Will Not End Well, Moderna Museet, Stockholm, Focussed on slideshows and films (book). Travelled to
  - Stedelijk Museum Amsterdam
  - Neue Nationalgalerie, Berlin.
- 2025/26: Stendhal Syndrome, Rencontres d'Arles, Arles. Traveling to
  - Vancouver Art Gallery
- 2026: Nan Goldin: This Will Not End Well, Grand Palais, Paris

For some group exhibitions see catalogues listed in Books on Goldin.

== Exhibitions curated by Goldin ==
=== Witnesses: Against Our Vanishing ===
Curated by Goldin at Artists Space, Witnesses: Against Our Vanishing (November 16, 1989 – January 6, 1990) invited New York artists to respond to the HIV/AIDS crisis. Artists represented included David Armstrong, Tom Chesley, Dorit Cypis, Philip-Lorca diCorcia, Jane Dickson, Darrel Ellis, Allen Frame, Peter Hujar, Greer Lankton, Siobhan Liddel, Mark Morrisroe, Jamie Nares, Perico Pastor, Margo Pelletier, Clarence Elie-Rivera, Vittorio Scarpati, Jo Shane, Kiki Smith, Janet Stein, Stephen Tashjian, Shellburne Thurber, Ken Tisa, and David Wojnarowicz. Goldin noted that artists' works varied in response, as "out of loss comes memory pieces, tributes to friends and lovers who have died; out of anger comes explorations of the political cause and effects of the disease."

David Wojnarowicz's essay "Post Cards from America: X-Rays from Hell" in the exhibition's catalogue criticized conservative legislation that Wojnarowicz believed would increase the spread of HIV by discouraging safe sex education. Additionally, Wojnarowicz speaks about the efficacy of making the private public via the model of outing, as he and Goldin believed empowerment begins through self-disclosure. Embracing personal identities then becomes a political statement that disrupts oppressive rules of behavior of bourgeois society – though Wojnarowicz does admit outing may lock a subject into a single frozen identity. Goldin's show was also met with criticism, but in particular Wojnarowicz's explicit essay, Goldin as curator stood by, lead to the National Endowment for the Arts rescinding its support for the publication.

=== From Desire: A Queer Diary ===
Goldin's second curated show, From Desire: A Queer Diary (March 29 – April 19, 1991), was held at the Richard F. Brush Art Gallery at St. Lawrence University, Canton, NY. Artists who were exhibited included David Armstrong, Eve Ashcraft, Kathryn Clark, Joyce Culver, Zoe Leonard, Simon Leung, Robert Mapplethorpe, Robert Windrum, and David Wojnarowicz.

=== Nan's Guests ===
Rencontres d'Arles 2009, Arles, France. The major show of the photo festival included the work of thirteen photographers including Antoine d'Agata, David Armstrong, JH Engström, Christine Fenzl, Jim Goldberg, Boris Mikhailov, Anders Petersen and Annelies Strba. As guest of honor she also choose Leigh Ledare for a solo show.

== Publications ==
- The Ballad of Sexual Dependency, edited with Marvin Heiferman, Mark Holborn and Suzanne Fletcher. New York: Aperture, 1986. ISBN 978-0-89381-236-2. Kodak Photobook Award (Arles 1987).
  - Remastered reissue: 2012. ISBN 978-1-59711-208-6.
  - New afterword: 2021.
- The Other Side (DAAD Artists-in-Residence Program, Berlin). Zurich: Scalo, 1993. ISBN 1-881616-03-7.
  - Expanded 2nd edition with revised introduction by Goldin. Göttingen: Steidl, 2019 (2nd pr. 2023). ISBN 978-3-95829-613-8.
- Vakat, with poems by Joachim Sartorius. Cologne: Walter Konig, 1993. ISBN 978-3-88375-178-8.
- Desire by Numbers, with fiction by Klaus Kertess. San Francisco: Artspace, 1994. ISBN 978-0-9631095-3-8.
- A Double Life, with David Armstrong. Zurich/New York: Scalo, 1994. ISBN 978-1-881616-21-4.
- Tokyo Love, with Nobuyoshi Araki. Tokyo: Hon don do, 1994. ISBN 978-4-87233-189-9 (Japanese).
  - English edition: Zurich/New York: Scalo, 1995. ISBN 978-1-881616-57-3.
- I'll Be Your Mirror (exhibition catalogue), edited by Elisabeth Sussman and David Armstrong. Zurich: Scalo, 1996. ISBN 3-931141-33-0.
- Ten Years After: Naples 1986–1996, with Guido Costa (text), edited with Gigi Giannuzzi and Guido Costa. Zurich: Scalo, 1998. ISBN 3-931141-79-9.
- Couples and Loneliness, edited with Taka Kawachi. Kyoto: Korinsha, 1998. ISBN 978-4-7713-0342-3 (English/Japanese).
- Nan Goldin: Recent Photographs (=Perspectives 115, exhibition catalogue). Houston: Contemporary Arts Museum, 1999. ISBN 978-0-936080-51-2.
- The Devil's Playground. London: Phaidon, 2003. ISBN 978-0-7148-4223-3.
- Fantastic Tales: The Photography of Nan Goldin (exhibition catalogue), edited by Jonathan Weinberg and Joyce Henri Robinson. Pennsylvania: Palmer Museum of Art, Pennsylvania State University, 2005. ISBN 978-0-911209-63-1.
- Soeurs, Saintes et Sibylles. Editions du Regard, 2005. ISBN 978-2-84105-179-3 (French).
- The Beautiful Smile (Hasselblad Award), edited by Jack Ritchey, Gerhard Steidl and Walter Keller. Hasselblad Center, Gothenburg, and Göttingen: Steidl, 2007. ISBN 3-86521-539-4.
  - 2nd edition. Göttingen: Steidl, 2017. ISBN 978-3-95829-174-4.
- Variety. Photographs by Nan Goldin (from the Film by Bette Gordon), text by James Crump. New York: Skira Rizzoli, 2009. ISBN 978-0-8478-3255-2.
- Eden and After, with Guido Costa. London: Phaidon, 2014. ISBN 978-07148-6577-5.
- Diving for Pearls (exhibition catalogue). Göttingen: Steidl, 2016. ISBN 978-3-95829-094-5.
- Visible/Invisible (exhibition catalogue, Château de Versailles), Ed. Dilecta, 2019. ISBN 264408372796.
- Käthe-Kollwitz-Preis 2022: Nan Goldin (exhibition catalogue). Berlin: Akademie der Künste, 2023. ISBN 978-3-88331-253-8.
- This Will Not End Well (exhibition catalogue). Stockholm: Moderna Museet, and Göttingen: Steidl, 2023. ISBN 978-3-96999-058-2.

=== Publications with contributions by Goldin ===
- "Peter Hujar", in: Parkett, No. 44. Zurich: Parkett, 1995. ISBN 978-3-907509-94-4, S. 15f(–22). (German/English).
- David Armstrong: The Silver Cord. Afterword by Goldin. Zurich/Berlin/New York: Scalo, 1997. ISBN 978-3-931141-48-6.
- Parkett No. 57: Doug Aitken, Thomas Hirschhorn, Nan Goldin. Zurich: Parkett, 1999 (German/English).
- Jean-Christian Bourcart. Madonnes Infertiles. Text by Goldin. Edition of 1200 copies. Paris: TDM Editions, 2002 (no ISBN).
- Jean-Christian Bourcart. All About Love. Text by Goldin. Loco, 2014. ISBN 978-2-919507-34-4.
- Tomasz Gudzowaty. Beyond the Body. Edited by Goldin. Göttingen: Steidl, 2017. ISBN 978-3-95829-040-2.
- "I Survived the Opioid Crisis". In: Artforum, Vol. 56, January 2018.
- Christine Fenzl. Land in Sonne. Texts by Dani Levy and Goldin. Ostfildern: Hatje Cantz, 2019. ISBN 978-3-7757-4609-0.

=== Books on Goldin ===
Listed are catalogues of group exhibitions, Goldin took part in, that reveal different facets of her work and biography by comparison with other like-minded artists, as well as publications on different subjects like the portrait, the self-portrait, subcultures in art, autobiographical storytelling and its meaning, the snapshot as expressive style etc.

- Nan Goldin's Ballad of Sexual Dependency, interview by Mark Holborn. In: Aperture #103 – Fiction and Metaphor, edited by Kenneth Rush. New York: Aperture, 1986, p. 58.
- Max Kozloff. Real Faces. Exhibition catalogue, with Bill Burke, Birney Imes, Judith Joy Ross and Goldin. New York: Whitney Museum of American Art at Philip Morris, 1988.
- Philip Monk. The American Trip: Larry Clark, Nan Goldin, Cady Noland, Richard Prince... Exhibition catalogue, Contemporary Art Gallery at Harbourfront Centre, Toronto. Power Plant, 1996. ISBN 978-0-921047-07-0. On America and its image of the outcast.
- Nobuyoshi Araki/Diane Arbus/Nan Goldin. Exhibition catalogue, Goetz Collection, Munich: Sammlung Goetz, 1997. Texts by Elisabeth Bronfen, Johannes Meinhardt, Ingvild Goetz and Goldin (German/English).
- Emotions and Relations: Nan Goldin, David Armstrong, Mark Morrisroe, Jack Pierson and Philip-Lorca diCorcia. Exhibition catalogue, Hamburger Kunsthalle (curated by F. C. Gundlach). Cologne: Taschen, 1998. ISBN 3-82287507-4 (English/German/French). "Five from Boston."
- Rachel Rosenfield Lafo, Gillian Nagler: Photography in Boston: 1955–1985. Exhibition catalogue, DeCordova Museum. Cambridge, Mass.: MIT Press, 2000. ISBN 978-0-262-12229-0. Broad survey featuring Berenice Abbott, William Wegman, Lotte Jacobi, Harold Edgerton a. o.
- Guido Costa, Lisa Liebman. Nan Goldin. Phaidon 55s, London: Phaidon, 2001. ISBN 0-7148-4073-4. Small but quality paperback introduction.
  - larger format edition: 2006. ISBN 978-0-7148-4553-1.
  - small hardback edition: 2010. ISBN 978-0-7148-5945-3.
- Katherine A. Bussard. So the Story Goes: Photographs by Tina Barney, Philip-Lorca DiCorcia, Nan Goldin, Sally Mann, and Larry Sultan. New Haven, Ct: Yale University Press, 2006. ISBN 978-0300114119.
- Susan Bright. Auto Focus: The Self-Portrait in Contemporary Photography. London: Thames & Hudson, 2010. ISBN 978-0500543894.
- Daniel Jelitzka, Gerald A. Matt (eds.). Die Kamera ist grausam / The camera is cruel: Lisette Model, Diane Arbus, Nan Goldin. Vienna: Verlag für moderne Kunst, 2018 (German/English).
- Catherine Zuromskis. Snapshot Photography. Cambridge, Mass.: MIT Press, 2021. ISBN 978-0-262-54411-5.
- Harrison Adams. Intimacy, Photography, Shame: 1969-1992, 98-134. London: Routledge, 2024. ISBN 1032732814.

== Depiction in film ==
=== Feature films ===
With experimental filmmaker Bette Gordon Goldin worked several times. In Empty Suitcases from 1980 she acted alongside Irish artist and friend Vivienne Dick. In the 1983 film Variety Goldin plays a character called Nan. She also accompanied the production of the film with her camera; the photographs were published in 2009 (see bibliography). For Gordon's 1998 Luminous Motion, she worked again as still photographer.

Goldin also provided still photography for two films by Sara Driver: You Are Not I (1981, co-written by Jim Jarmusch and its director), starring Goldin's lover and friend Suzanne Fletcher, and herself playing one of the accident victims. In 1993 followed When Pigs Fly with Alfred Molina.

Photographs shown in the 1986 film Working Girls, as taken by the lead character Molly, were those of Goldin.

In the production of Mary Harron's infamous I Shot Andy Warhol (1996) with Lili Taylor as Valerie Solanas, Goldin is listed for "special photography".

The photographs by the character Lucy Berliner, played by actress Ally Sheedy in Lisa Cholodenko's 1998 film High Art, were based on those by Goldin.

In the second season of the 2017 HBO series The Deuce by George Pelecanos and David Simon she has a cameo sitting at a bar.

=== Documentary films ===
On the occasion of her first major retrospective in the UK an early documentary was made beforehand in 1995 for the BBC by Edmund Coulthard, called like the show, I'll Be Your Mirror. The film received a Teddy Award at the Berlin International Film Festival 1996, and the City of Melbourne Award at the Melbourne International Film Festival.

Paul Tschinkel did a 30-minute feature on occasion of the retrospective being shown at the Whitney Museum in New York, titled Nan Goldin: In My Life.

The intimate hour-long portrait Nan Goldin: I Remember Your Face directed by Sabine Lidl came out in 2011.

In 2022, filmmaker Laura Poitras' Peabody Award-winning documentary All the Beauty and the Bloodshed on Goldin premiered at the 79th Venice International Film Festival. The feature-length film scored by Soundwalk Collective interweaves Goldin's biography told by herself, with her engagement with P.A.I.N. against the Sackler family, evolving in part during the COVID-19 pandemic. The film was awarded the Golden Lion in Venice and was nominated for the Academy Award for Best Documentary Feature.
