= Gail Thacker =

American photographer (born 1959)

- Born: 1959 (age 66–67); Providence, Rhode Island
- Education: School of the Museum of Fine Arts at Tufts
- Known for: Photography

Gail Thacker is a visual artist most known for her use of type 665 Polaroid positive/negative film in which her subjects — friends, lovers, the city — become intertwined with the process and chemistry of her photos. She attended the School of the Museum of Fine Arts at Tufts and has lived and worked in New York City since 1982. She is part of a group of artists called The Boston School.

== Life ==
Gail Thacker was born in Providence, Rhode Island in 1959.

Thacker studied fine arts at the Atlanta Arts Alliance from 1976 to 1978. She then studied at the School of the Museum of Fine Arts at Tufts concentrating on video, painting, and photography, and graduated in 1981. Thacker also studied at the Center for Advanced Visual Studies at Massachusetts Institute of Technology between 1978 and 1981.

She moved to New York City in 1982.

== Photography ==
Thacker's Polaroid photography has been published and exhibited internationally.

Thacker's interest in Polaroid photography began after Mark Morrisroe gave her a new box of unexposed Polaroid 665 Positive/Negative film. They met at the School of the Museum of Fine Arts in Boston during a video class. Mark, a photographer and performance artist, features in Thacker's photographs. He was diagnosed with AIDS in 1986 and died in 1989. In New York City, the AIDS epidemic had already started by the time Thacker moved there. Thacker said in a lecture, "The only thing I have control over was my relationship with these Polaroids. This was the only way I could stop time from destroying the rest of my friends."

Thacker's process includes first aging the Polaroid photographs before developing them. She left some unrinsed photographs wrapped in plastic, which caused distortion of the images. She allowed images to sit in their chemicals for months to years before developing the negatives. Thacker said over email, "I have distressed my images to express a sense of inner agony. I sometimes feel a crippling knowledge that I am invisible and alone."

Exhibitions of Thacker's work includes museums and galleries such as the Museum of the City of New York, Leslie-Lohman Museum of Gay and Lesbian Art, Centro Galego de Arte Contemporánea (CGAC), Santiago, Spain; and the Safety Gallery, the June Bateman Gallery, Elizabeth Dee Gallery, Clamp Art, Daniel Cooney Fine Arts, Grey Art Gallery in New York, and Participant, Inc. in New York. Her Polaroid work is included in such collections as The Polaroid Collection (Somerville, Massachusetts), Fotomuseum Winterthur (Winterthur, Switzerland), CGAC (Santiago, Spain), the Fisher Collection (Florida), and the New York Public Library. Thacker is featured in publications such as, The Polaroid Book (Taschen), Familiar Feelings (on the Boston Group), There was a Sense of Family: The Friends of Mark Morrisroe (Moderne Kunst, Nürnberg), Mark Dirt (Paper Chase Press), Tabboo! The Art of Stephen Tashjian (Distributed Art Publishers), Frontiers Journal of Women Studies (University of Nebraska Press), along with articles in such newspapers and magazines such as The New York Times, The Daily News, the New York Press, The New Yorker, Providence Town Magazine and The Village Voice, and a soon to be released book on her Polaroid art which will include essays by Eileen Myles and Manuel Segade in a bilingual Spanish and English edition.

== Theatre ==
In 2005, Thacker became the owner and director of the Gene Frankel Theatre, and since then her work has documented the memory of the artistic community at the Gene Frankel Theatre. She has worked with artists such as Stephen Tashjian, Holly Woodlawn, Sur Rodney (Sur) and Arleen Schloss, and Chi Chi Valenti, keeping a sense of underground art and performance art alive in New York City.
