= Boston School =

Boston School can refer to:

- Boston School (painting)
- Boston School (music)
- Boston Expressionism, a school of painting sometimes referred to as the Boston School
- Boston School (photography), a group of young photographers active in the 1970s and 1980s
