= Rineke Dijkstra =

Dutch photographer

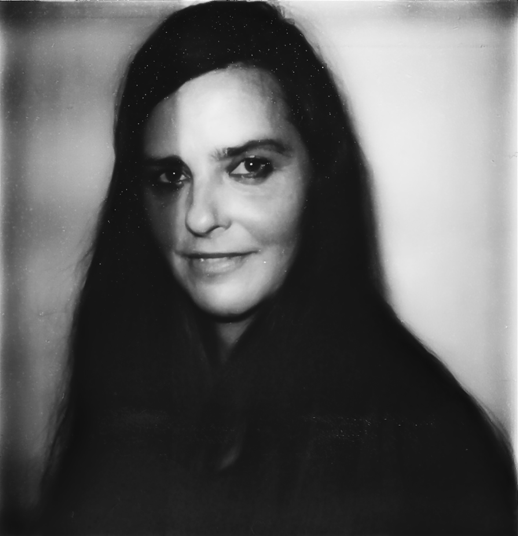
- Dijkstra in 2011
- Born: 2 June 1959 (age 66); Sittard, Netherlands
- Education: Gerrit Rietveld Academie
- Known for: Photography
- Notable work: Beach Portraits, Almerisa, Olivier, The Buzzclub, Daniel, Adi, Shira, and Keren, Rishonim High School, Herzliya, Israel
- Awards: HonFRPS

Rineke Dijkstra HonFRPS (born 2 June 1959) is a Dutch photographer. She lives and works in Amsterdam. Dijkstra has been awarded an Honorary Fellowship of the Royal Photographic Society, the 1999 Citibank Private Bank Photography Prize (now Deutsche Börse Photography Prize) and the 2017 Hasselblad Award.

== Early life and education ==
Dijkstra was born June 2, 1959, in Sittard, the Netherlands. She attended the Gerrit Rietveld Academie in Amsterdam from 1981 to 1986. She then spent a few years working commercially, taking corporate portraits and images for annual reports.

== Work ==
Dijkstra concentrates on single portraits, and usually works in series, looking at groups such as adolescents, clubbers, and soldiers, from the Beach Portraits of 1992 and on, to the video installation Buzzclub/Mysteryworld (1996–1997), Tiergarten Series (1998–2000), Israeli Soldiers (1999–2000), and the single-subject portraits in serial transition: Almerisa (1994–2005), Shany (2001–2003), Olivier (2000–2003), and Park Portraits (2005–2006). Her subjects are often shown standing, facing the camera, against a minimal background. This compositional style is evident in her beach portraits, which generally feature one or more adolescents against a seascape. This style is again seen in her studies of women who have just given birth.

Dijkstra dates her artistic awakening to a 1991 self-portrait. Taken with a 4 × 5 inch view camera after she had emerged from a swimming pool — therapy to recover from a bicycle accident — it presents her in a state of near-collapse. Commissioned by a Dutch newspaper to make photographs based on the notion of summertime, she then took photographs of adolescent bathers. This project resulted in Beach Portraits (1992–94), a series of full-length, nearly life-size color photographs of teenagers and slightly younger children taken at the water's edge in the United States, Poland, Britain, Ukraine, and Croatia. The series brought her to international prominence after it was exhibited in 1997 in the annual show of new photography at the Museum of Modern Art in New York; in 1999, the museum showed Odesa, Ukraine, August 4, 1993, a color photograph of a teenage boy on a beach, next to Cézanne's Male Bather (1885–1887).

Begun during Dijkstra's residency at the German Academic Exchange Service DAAD in Berlin from 1998 to 1999, the Tiergarten series (1998–2000) shows portraits of adolescent girls and boys photographed in the Tiergarten park in Berlin, as well as in another park in Lithuania. Another series of works was commissioned by the Anne Frank Foundation in Amsterdam for their new building: portraits of adolescent schoolgirls with their best friends, a poignant reminder that any girl could be an "Anne Frank" in unlucky circumstances. These portraits were primarily taken in Berlin, though Dijkstra later expanded her subjects to include Milan, Barcelona, and Paris.

During a project documenting refugees, six-year-old Almerisa, whose family fled Bosnia, asked Dijkstra to take her photo. Almerisa was photographed approximately every two years. Firstly, at an asylum centre as a young child on March 14, 1994. The last photograph of the Almerisa series was taken on June 19, 2008. Thus began Dijkstra's serial project, tracing her subject's transitions through both adolescence and relocation from East to West Europe. Dijkstra uses flash along with a reduction of colour in this Almerisa series. She declutters the room completely so it is void of any superfluous details such as furniture and pictures on the wall. This provides a blank background. This technique is also used in other series, e.g. Beach Portraits.

One later series shows a young Israeli woman, Shany, in the series Israeli Soldiers (1999–2003) at stages over the course of a year and a half, is shown at her induction, twice more in her soldier uniform, and at home after leaving the army.

The Olivier series (2000–03) follows a young man, Olivier Silva, from his enlistment with the French Foreign Legion through the years of his service in Corsica, Gabon, Côte d'Ivoire and Djibouti, showing his development, both physically and psychologically, into a soldier. For the series Park Portraits (2003–06), Dijkstra photographed children, adolescents, and teenagers momentarily suspending their varied activities to stare into the lens from scenic spots in Amsterdam's Vondelpark, Brooklyn's Prospect Park, Madrid's El Parque del Retiro, and Xiamen's Amoy Botanical Garden, among others.

Filmed in Russia and commissioned by Manifesta 2014, the video portrait Marianna (The Fairy Doll) shows a young classical dancer rehearsing in a St Petersburg studio as she prepares to audition for a place at the Vaganova Academy of Russian Ballet.

Dijkstra uses a Japanese 4×5 inch view camera, with a standard lens on a tripod, and a flash on another tripod behind it. Even when she photographed children on the beach she used this same setup, with a portable flash to reduce contrast and bring the faces slightly out of deep shadow, modulating the sunlight. However, daylight is always her main light source. In 1998 she started to print her photographs at the Grieger Photo Lab in Düsseldorf, Germany, two and a half hours by train from Amsterdam, where Thomas Struth and Andreas Gursky, among other European art photographers of large-scale prints, work.

Dijkstra has also experimented with video in works such as the two-channel projection The Buzzclub, Liverpool, UK/Mysteryworld, Zaandam, NL (1996–1997), Ruth Drawing Picasso, Tate Liverpool, UK (2009), the four-channel installation The Krazyhouse (Megan, Simon, Nicky, Philip, Dee), Liverpool, UK, (2009), and the three-screen video piece I See a Woman Crying (Weeping Woman) (2009–2010) and 3-channel video installation Night Watching (2019). For The Buzzclub, Liverpool, UK/Mysteryworld, Zaandam, NL, Dijkstra visited two nightclubs, the first in Liverpool, dominated by 15-year-old working-class girls; the second, in the Netherlands, a hangout for working-class boys with shaved heads, wearing matching hip-hop outfits. She set up studios in the clubs and asked volunteers to dance one at a time in front of the camera, the contrast between the girls and boys, each assertive and vulnerable in equal proportion, being a subject of the video. She made another video in 1997, Annemiek, which showed a shy, Dutch teenager singing a Backstreet Boys song karaoke style. For Ruth Drawing Picasso, Dijkstra simply trained the camera on an English schoolgirl as she sat on the floor, intently sketching a portrait of Dora Maar at Tate Liverpool. In I See a Woman Crying (Weeping Woman), Dijkstra used Picasso's The Weeping Woman (1937) in the Tate Liverpool as the distraction device for a group of English schoolchildren, who were asked to describe what they saw in the painting which never appears on screen. In Night Watching Dijkstra films people responding to Rembrandt’s The Night Watch in the Rijksmuseum.

== Exhibitions ==
Dijkstra's photographs have appeared in numerous international exhibitions, including the 1997 and 2001 Venice Biennale, the 1998 Bienal de Sao Paulo, Turin's Biennale Internationale di Fotografia in 1999, and the 2003 International Center for Photography's Triennial of Photography and Video in New York.

Solo exhibitions in 1998 were held at Museum Boymans-van Beuningen, Rotterdam, the Sprengel Museum, Hanover, and Museum Folkwang, Essen. In 1999, Dijkstra's work was exhibited at MACBA, Barcelona. In 2001, exhibitions were held at the Frans Hals Museum (De Hallen), Haarlem, The Netherlands and the Herzliya Museum of Contemporary Art, Israel. In 2005–2006 a travelling exhibition Rineke Dijkstra: Portraits was shown at Jeu de Paume, Paris and at Fotomuseum Winterthur, La Caixa, Barcelona, and Rudolfinum, Prague. In 2019, Dijkstra presented a 3-channel video installation Night Watching in the Rijksmuseum.

In the United States, Dijkstra has had solo exhibitions at the Art Institute of Chicago (2001), the Institute of Contemporary Art, Boston (2001) and LaSalle Bank, Chicago (2004). A comprehensive exhibition of her work, Rineke Dijkstra: A Retrospective, was organised by the San Francisco Museum of Modern Art (SFMOMA) and New York's Guggenheim Museum in 2012. Bringing together more than 70 color photographs and 5 video works, the exhibition showed in 2012 at SFMOMA then at the Solomon R. Guggenheim Museum.

From December 10, 2016 - July 16, 2017 the National Gallery of Art presented Rineke Dijkstra.

== Awards ==
- 1987: Kodak Award, Nederland
- 1993: Art Encouragement Award, Amstelveen
- 1994: Werner Mantz Award
- 1998: 1999 Citibank Private Bank Photography Prize (now Deutsche Börse Photography Prize)
- 2002/2003: Wexner Center Residency Award recipient in media arts
- 2009: Artist in residence at the Atlantic Center for the Arts, New Smyrna Beach, Florida
- 2011: Honorary Doctorate from the Royal College of Art, London
- 2012: Honorary Fellowship of the Royal Photographic Society
- 2017: Winner of the Hasselblad Award, with a prize of €100,000.
- 2017: Spectrum – Internationaler Preis für Fotografie, Hanover, Germany
- 2020: The Johannes Vermeer Award

== Collections ==
Dijkstra's work is held in the following permanent collections:

- Tate, London
- Museum of Modern Art, New York
- Metropolitan Museum of Art, New York
- Guggenheim Museum, New York
- Jewish Museum (Manhattan), New York
- Albright-Knox Art Gallery, Buffalo, NY
- Los Angeles County Museum of Art
- Museum of Contemporary Art, Chicago
- Art Institute of Chicago
- San Francisco Museum of Modern Art
- Walker Art Center, Minneapolis
- Pérez Art Museum Miami
- Museum of Fine Arts, Boston
- Museo Cantonale d'Arte of Lugano
- Baltimore Museum of Art
- Museum De Pont, Tilburg

== Publications ==
=== Monographs ===
- Rineke Dijkstra. Beaches. Edition of 250 signed copies. Idea Books, Amsterdam, and Codax, Zürich 1996. ISBN 3-9521227-0-X.
- Menschenbilder. Exhibition catalogue edited by Ute Eskildsen and Rineke Dijkstra. Museum Folkwang, Essen 1998. No ISBN (German).
- The Buzzclub, Liverpool, UK/Mysteryworld, Zaandam, NL. Exhibition catalogue, Sprengel Museum, Hanover 1998.
- Portraits. Exhibition catalogue, Institute of Contemporary Art, Boston. Hatje Cantz, Ostfildern-Ruit 2001. ISBN 9783775710152.
- Israel Portraits. Exhibition booklet with text by Dijkstra. Herzliya Museum of Contemporary Art, Herzliya, and Sommer Contemporary Art Gallery, Tel Aviv 2001.
- Portraits. Exhibition catalogue edited by Hripsimé Visser, Stedelijk Museum Amsterdam, (Jeu de Paume, Paris, and Fotomuseum Winterthur). Schirmer/Mosel, Munich 2004. ISBN 978-3-8296-0151-1.
- Rineke Dijkstra – A Retrospective. Exhibition catalogue edited by Sandra S. Phillips. Guggenheim Museum, New York 2012. ISBN 978-0-89207-424-2.
- The Krazy House. Exhibition catalogue edited by Susanne Gaensheimer and Peter Gorschlüter. Museum für Moderne Kunst, Frankfurt 2013. ISBN 978-3-00-040526-6 (English/German).
- Figuren/Figures. Rineke Dijkstra and the Collection of Sprengel Museum Hannover. Spectrum – Internationaler Preis für Fotografie (2017), exhibition catalogue edited by Stefan Gronert, Sprengel Museum, Hanover 2018. ISBN 978-3-89169-241-7 (English/German).
- Rineke Dijkstra. The Louisiana Book. Exhibition catalogue, Louisiana, Humlebæk, Denmark, De Pont Museum, Tilburg, Nl. Walther König, Cologne 2017. ISBN 978-3-96098-216-6.
- WO MEN – Hasselblad Award 2017. Exhibition catalogue, Hasselblad Center, Gothenburg, edited by Louise Wolthers and Dragana Vujanovic Östlind. Walther König, Cologne 2017, ISBN 978-3-96098-206-7.

=== Further reading ===
- Fotofiktion. Exhibition catalogue with works by Rineke Dijkstra, Jock Sturges, Rémy Markowitsch, Florian Merkel, and Stephan Reusse. Kasseler Kunstverein, Kassel 1996. ISBN 3927941107 (German).
- Linda Roodenburg (ed.). PhotoWork(s) in Progress/Constructing Identity. Exhibition catalogue, Photoworks in Progress, Rotterdam 1997. No ISBN. (Dutch/English).
- Fleeting Portraits / Flüchtige Portraits. NGBK Neue Gesellschaft für Bildende Kunst, Berlin 1998. ISBN 3-926796-56-1.
- Antonia Carver (ed.). Blink. 100 Photographers, 10 Curators, 10 Writers. Phaidon, London 2002. ISBN 0-7148-4199-4. Features a. o. Dijkstra's Almerisa with text by Paul Wombell.
- Thomas Weski, Emma Dexter (eds.). Cruel and Tender. The Real in the 20th Century Photograph. Exhibition catalogue, Museum Ludwig, Cologne, and Tate Modern, London. Tate Publ., London 2004. ISBN 1-85437-454-0.
- Susan Bright. Art Photography Now. Aperture, New York 2005. ISBN 978-0-500-54305-4. Features a. o. Dijkstra's Shany.
- Grosenick, Uta; Riemschneider, Burkhard, eds. (2005). Art Now (25th anniversary ed.). Cologne: Taschen. pp. 84–87. ISBN 978-3-8228-4093-1.
- Thomas Weski, Jean-François Chevrier and Johan de Vos (eds.). Click Doubleclick. Exhibition catalogue Haus der Kunst, Munich, Centre for Fine Arts, Brussels. Walther König, Cologne 2006. ISBN 978-3-86560-053-0.
- Martin Hentschel (ed.). Wanderland (Israel—Palestine). Exhibition catalogue, Museum Haus Lange, Krefeld. Kerber, Bielefeld 2006. ISBN 978-3-86678-035-4 (German/English). Features a. o. Dijkstra's Shany.
- Ritratti di Potere/Portraits and Power - People Politics and Structures. Exhibition catalogue, Palazzo Strozzi, Florence. Silvana Editoriale, Milan 2010. ISBN 9788836618149. Features a. o. Dijkstra's Olivier.
- Frits Gierstberg. European Portrait Photography. Prestel, Munich 2015. ISBN 978-3-7913-4927-5.
- Emilie Bouvard (ed.). Picasso.Mania: Picasso and the Contemporary Masters. Exhibition catalogue, Grand Palais, Paris 2015. ISBN 978-3-7774-2520-7. Features a. o. Dijkstra's I See a Woman Crying.
- Phillip Prodger. Face Time. A History of the Photographic Portrait. Thames & Hudson, London 2022. ISBN 978-0-500-54491-4.
