= Boston School (photography) =

The Boston School of photography is a loose group of artists with their own styles. Members use a messy and instinctive approach to photography, in an effort to be more true to life.

Members of the group include Gail Thacker, Mark Morrisroe, Jack Pierson, and Nan Goldin. Other members include David Armstrong, Philip-Lorca diCorcia, and Tabboo!.

Morrisroe was the unofficial lead figure of the Boston School of photography.

Morrisroe met Thacker, Goldin, and Armstrong at the School of the Museum of Fine Arts at Tufts while they were all students there. diCorcia had already left the school, but was friends with Goldin and met Morrisroe when they were both living in New York City. Pierson was a first-year student at the Massachusetts College of Art when he met Morrisroe, who was a senior.

Gail Thacker is known for her Polaroid photography.
