= Mark Morrisroe =

American photographer (1959–1989)

- Self Portrait (to Brent), 1982, Mark Morrisroe
- Born: January 10, 1959; Malden, Massachusetts, U.S.
- Died: July 24, 1989 (aged 30); Jersey City, New Jersey, U.S.
- Education: School of the Museum of Fine Arts, Boston
- Known for: Photography, performance art
- Movement: Punk

Mark Morrisroe (January 10, 1959 – July 24, 1989) was an American performance artist and photographer. He is known for his performances and photographs, which were germane in the development of the punk scene in Boston in the 1970s and the art world boom of the mid- to late 1980s in New York City. By the time of his death he had created some 2,000 pieces of work.

== Life and career ==
Born to a drug-addicted mother in Malden, Massachusetts, Morrisroe left home and began hustling under the name Mark Dirt at the age of 15. His mother was a tenant of Albert DeSalvo, who would become known as "the Boston Strangler", and Mark often told people he was DeSalvo's illegitimate son. When he was 17 years old, a disgruntled client shot him in the back, leaving him with a bullet lodged next to his spine for the rest of his life. The experience had a profound influence on his art, which often incorporated images of young prostitutes and X-rays of his injured chest.

He attended the School of the Museum of Fine Arts, Boston, where he made friends with several soon-to-be-well-known artists, including Nan Goldin, David Armstrong, Philip-Lorca diCorcia, Stephen Tashjian (aka Tabboo!, with whom he founded the drag duo "Clam Twins" at the Pyramid Club in NYC's East Village), Gail Thacker and Pat Hearn. His boyfriend in Boston was Johnathan Pierson, who later changed his name to Jack Pierson. He graduated from the Museum School with honors receiving the coveted "5th" Year" Award.

While attending, he performed as a drag character of his own creation, Sweet Raspberry, and co-founded a zine called Dirt Magazine with his friend Lynelle White, distributing it in Boston nightclubs. This zine was composed of fake news and gossip about celebrities, bands and other famous people, mostly from Boston.

His career as a photographer began when he was given a Polaroid Model 195 Land Camera. He experimented with unusual development techniques, receiving generous support of supplies, film, and chemicals from the Polaroid Corporation. Within his close circle of friends he soon laid claim to the "invention" of what are called "sandwich" prints—enlargements of double negatives of the same subject mounted on top of one another—which yielded an elaborate pictorial quality, producing a very iconic painterly impression in the final result, which over time he learned to use in an increasingly controlled way.

Early on, the artist recognized the intrinsic value of prints—irrespective of the medium used to produce them—as pictorial objects that he could manipulate, color, paint and write on at will. Thus, Morrisroe scrawled comments, biographical notes and dedications on the side of his pictures, which made them very personal pieces of art. His photographs were mostly portraits, and his subjects included lovers, friends, hustlers, and people who visited his apartment. He also often incorporated stills from Super 8 films. There are a few photographs which incorporate landscapes and external shots.

== Death ==
Morrisroe died on July 24, 1989, aged 30, in Jersey City, New Jersey, from complications of AIDS. His ashes are scattered in McMinnville, Oregon, on the farm of his last boyfriend, Ramsey McPhillips. He is considered a member of the Boston School of Photography and his work is found in many important collections including that of the Whitney and MOCA of Los Angeles. The estate of Mark Morrisroe (Collection Ringier) is currently located at the Fotomuseum Winterthur.

== Legacy ==
After his death, he was the center of the survey exhibition at ICA Boston 1995 (curated by Lia Gangitano). Solo exhibitions of his work have included Mark Morrisroe, 1959-1989, Neue Gesellschaft für Bildende Kunst, Berlin, and My Life: Mark Morrisroe, Polaroids 1977-1989, MOCA, Los Angeles (both 1997).

== Filmography ==
Between 1981 and 1984, he shot three low-budget movies on Super 8 film: The Laziest Girl in Town (1981), Hello from Bertha (1983) and Nymph-O-Maniac (1984). These films were reportedly influenced by such directors as John Waters and Jack Smith.

== Exhibitions ==
"His work was exhibited by Pat Hearn Gallery from 1985 onward, including solo exhibitions in 1986 and 1988, His photographs have been included in two group shows at Artists Space: Split Vision, in 1985 (curated by Robert Mapplethorpe): and Witnesses: Against Our Vanishing, 1989 (curated by Nan Goldin).

- Mark Morrisroe: From This Moment On: Artists' Space 2011.
- 2010 Fotomuseum Winterthur, Winterthur, Switzerland
- 2011 Mark Morrisroe: From This Moment On: Artists Space, New York. Curated by Richard Birkett and Stefan Kalmar).
- 2012 Mark Morrisroe. Museum Villa Stuck, Munich.
- 2014 Mark Morrisroe (1959-1989): Hello from Bertha, ClampArt, New York
- 2016 Mark Morrisroe. Photos from NYC and Boston from 1982 to 1985. Alexander and Bonin gallery. New York.
- 2018 Mark Morrisroe (1959-1989): Boy Next Door (Beautiful but Dumb), ClampArt, New York

== Publications ==
- Mark Morrisroe: Journal of Contemporary Art, Distributed Art Publishers, 1996
- Boston School, Boston Institute of Contemporary Art, 1996
- Mark Morrisroe: My Life, Power House Books, 1997
- Emotions & Relations: Nan Goldin, David Armstrong, Mark Morrisroe, Jack Pierson, Philip-Lorca Dicorcia, Taschen, 1998
- Mark Morrisroe, Twin Palms, 1999
- Der subjektive Blick in den Fotografien der "Boston School". David Armstrong - Philip-Lorca diCorcia - Nan Goldin - Mark Morrisroe - Jack Pierson - Shellburne Thurber, Tectum Verlag, 2008
- Mark Morrisroe, JRP|Ringier, 2011
- "Mark Morrisroe: Memento Mori / A Photographic Memoir by Megan "Montana" Smith, Blurb, 2012.
- Mark Morrisroe: Mark Dirt, Paper Chase Press, 2012
- It's all the same, you're queer anyhow! Les films de Mark Morrisroe, Yann Beauvais,
- There Was a Sense of Family: The Friends of Mark Morrisroe, Verlag für moderne Kunst, 2012
- Changing Difference: Queer Politics and Shifting Identities: Peter Hujar, Mark Morrisroe, Jack Smith, Silvana Editoriale, 2013
- Screaming in the Streets: AIDS, Art, Activism, ClampArt and Ward 5B, 2017
