= Ivy wearing a fall, Boston =

1973 photograph by Nan Goldin

- "Ivy wearing a fall, Boston"
- Artist: Nan Goldin
- Year: 1973
- Type: Gelatin silver print photograph
- Dimensions: 50.5 cm × 40.3 cm (19.875 in × 15.875 in)
- Location: Solomon R. Guggenheim Museum; New York City

Ivy wearing a fall, Boston is a 1973 photograph on 35 mm film by the American photographer Nan Goldin. Depicting Goldin’s close friend Ivy with her head turned back, it is one of the many black-and-white photographs that Goldin took of Ivy, and Goldin's other friends between 1972 and 1974. The gelatin silver print measuring 19.875 in x 15.875 in (50.5 cm x 40.3 cm) was purchased by Solomon R. Guggenheim Museum in New York in 2002 and also gifted to Harvard Art Museums in Cambridge in 2011.

== Background ==
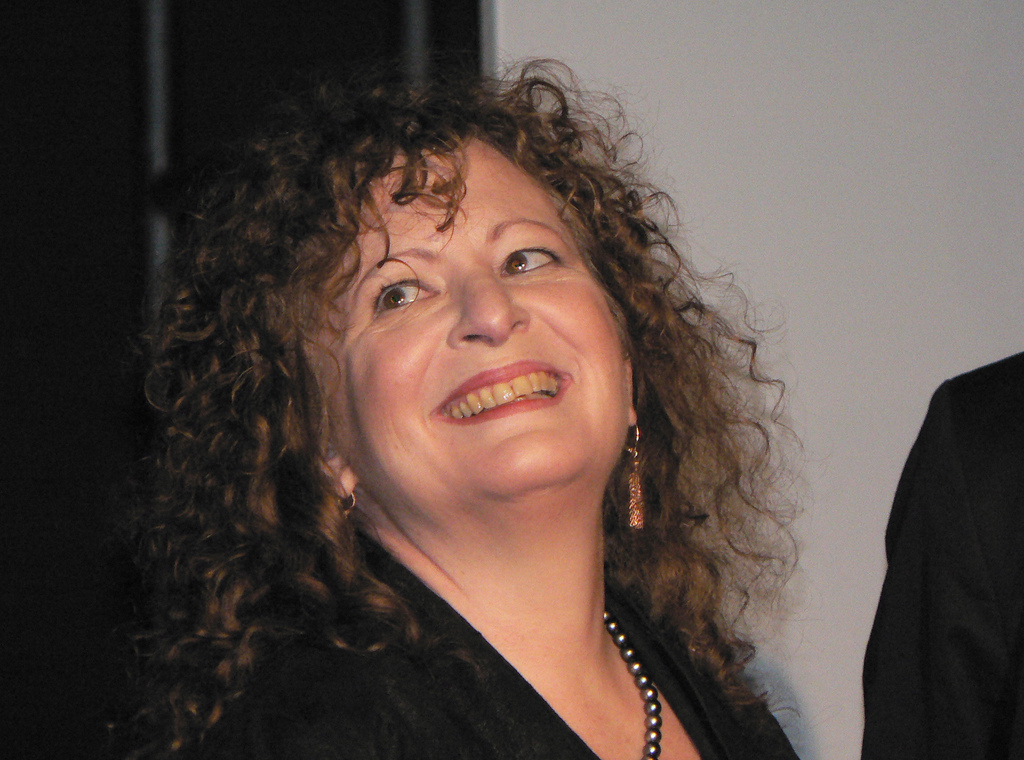
Nan Goldin in 2009

Goldin started her self taught photography journey as a teenager in Boston, before she moved to New York City in 1978. Though Goldin didn't have formal education in photography, she would find inspiration and heavy influence from fashion photography in French and Vogue Italia, especially Guy Bourdin and Helmut Newton, Andy Warhol’s early films, Federico Fellini, and Larry Clark. Her celebratory black-and-white photographs of drag queens prefigure her later signature cibachrome work such as her iconic series, The Ballad of Sexual Dependency.

== Details ==
When she was 19, Goldin lived in downtown Boston where she began building a name for herself by documenting her life, and the people she was closely acquainted with, in the subcultural community she made home. It was during her time there that her interest in photography solidified. She frequented The Other Side, a drag bar, where she became versed with the drag queens and transsexuals who later became the principal subjects for her photographs.

The black and white photograph shows Ivy, one of Goldin's friends. The photo is taken in a room that could be seen as a bedroom or dressing room. We see that she is holding herself, as her hand grips her upper arm. As she stands with her shoulder turned towards the viewer, we can see that Ivy is in drag, alluded to by her pronounced make-up and an extravagant hairstyle. The wig guilds the viewer down to the high waisted panties Ivy wears. The long-haired wig cascading behind her, epitomizing the sexual freedom and gender fluidity that Goldin admired. Goldin has said that she wanted to show respect and honor drag queens by portraying them as a “third gender, as another sexual option, a gender option.”

== See also ==
- 1973 in art
- Nan Goldin
