= Adriana Lestido =

Argentine photographer (born 1955)

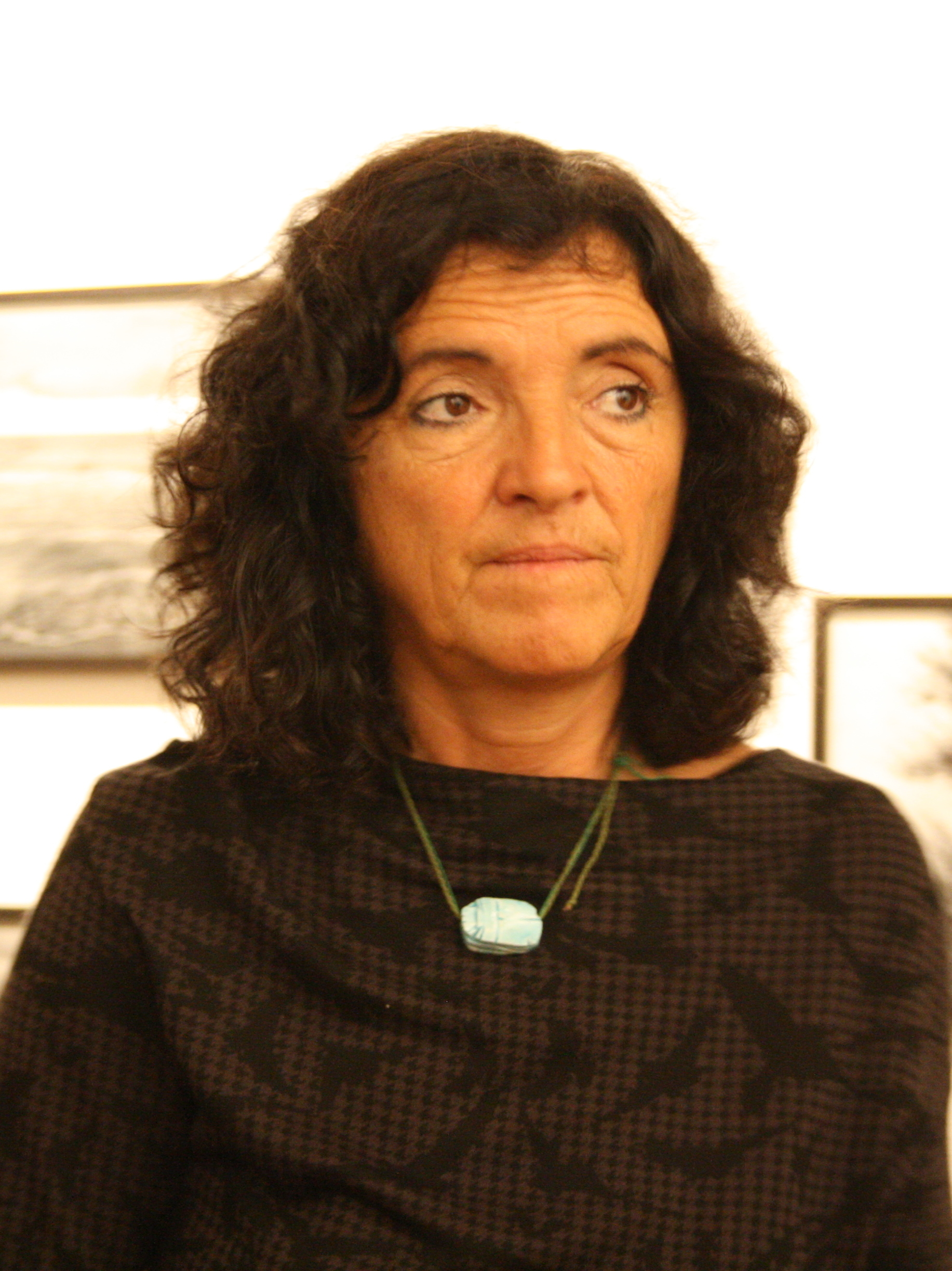
- Adriana Lestido in 2010
- Born: January 7, 1955 (age 71); Buenos Aires, Argentina
- Occupations: Photographer, Photojournalist
- Employer(s): La Voz del Interior, Página 12
- Website: www.adrianalestido.com.ar

Adriana Lestido (born 1955) is an Argentine photographer. Her black and white photographs document the often difficult place of women in society. Lestido is the author of several books including Mujeres presas (2001, 2008), Madres e hijas (2003), Interior (2010), La Obra (2011), Lo Que Se Ve (2012), and Metropolis (2022).

== Early life and education ==
Lestido was born in 1955 in Buenos Aires, Argentina. She studied photography at the Institute of Photographic Art and Audiovisual Techniques in Avellaneda.

== Exhibitions ==
A retrospective of Lestido's work was held in 2010 at the Casa de América in Madrid. It included black and white photographs made between 1979 and 2007. Other solo exhibitions include Lo Que Se Ve (What Can Be Seen), at the Cronopios hall at the Centro Cultural Recoleta (Buenos Aires) in 2008; Adriana Lestido. Fotografías 1979/2007, at the Museo Nacional de Bellas Artes, Argentina in 2013; Lo Que Se Ve (What Can Be Seen), at the Art Gallery, Consulate General and Promotion Center of the Argentine Republic, New York, in 2014.

== Awards ==
She won the Merit Diploma Konex Award in 2002 and Platinum Konex Award in 2022. She received a grant from the Hasselblad Foundation in 1991, the Mother Jones Foundation Prize in 1997, and the Grand Acquisition Prize at the Salón Nacional de Artes Visuales in 2009. In 1995, she was awarded a Guggenheim Fellowship. In 2010 she was declared to be an outstanding cultural figure by the legislature of the city of Buenos Aires.

== Collections ==
In Argentina, Lestido's works are included in the collections of Museo Nacional de Bellas Artes and the Museo de Arte Moderno, in the United States at the Museum of Fine Arts, Houston, in France at the Bibliothèque nationale and in Sweden at the Hasselblad Center in Gothenburg.

== Personal life ==
She lives in Buenos Aires and Mar de las Pampas.

== Works ==
- Lestido, Adriana (2003). Adriana Lestido: Madres e hijas. La Azotea editorial fotográfica. ISBN 978-950-9536-27-2.
- Lestido, Adriana. Adriana Lestido: Imprisoned Women with Their Children.
- Lestido, Adriana; Díaz, Gabriel; Travnik, Juan (2008). Adriana Lestido: lo que se ve : fotografías 1979-2007 : Sala Cronopios, Centro Cultural Recoleta, Buenos Aires, Argentina, de 11 de marzo al 20 de abril de 2008. Centro Cultural Recoleta. ISBN 978-987-05-3927-8.
- Lestido, Adriana (2010). Interior. Grupo Insud.
- Saccomanno, Guillermo (2007). Mujeres presas. Dilan Ed. ISBN 978-987-20412-7-4.
- Metropolis: Buenos Aires 1988/1999. RM, 2022. ISBN 978-8417975708.
