= Leigh Ledare =

American artist (born 1976)

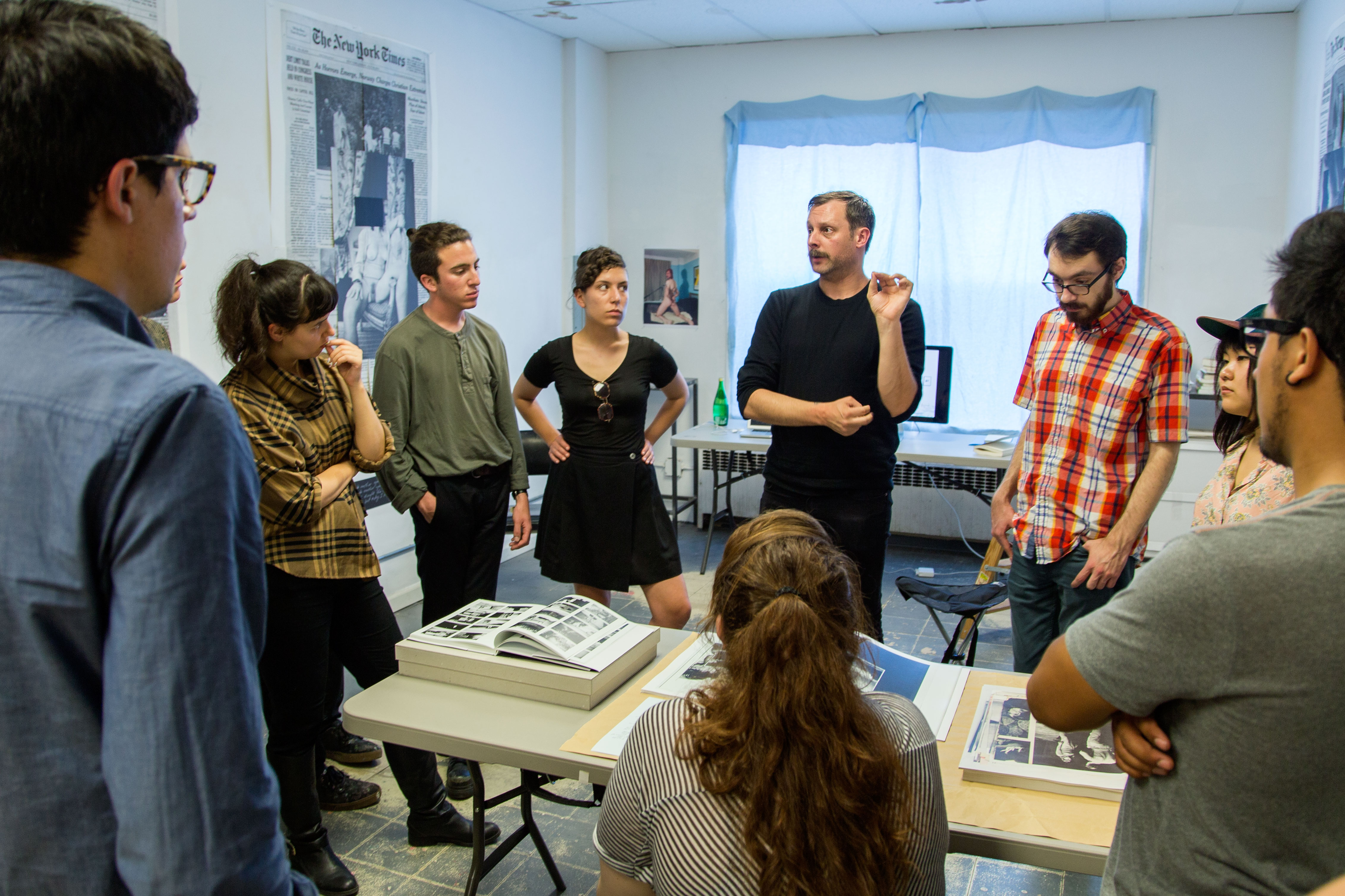
Leigh Ledare talks to the New York Arts Practicum in 2014

Leigh Ledare (born 1976) uses photography, archival material, text and film to explore human agency, social relationships, taboos and the photographic in equal turns. Through a wide span of artistic practices, Ledare examines issues related to desire, identity, and morality.

== Life and work ==
Ledare was born in Seattle, Washington. He first gained recognition through his exhibition and artist book titled Pretend You're Actually Alive (2000–2008), which examines the complex relations between the artist and his mother – namely, how she used intimacy, eroticism, and vulnerability to negotiate the balance of power within the family.

"The resulting images are often sumptuous, saturated with color, and surprisingly beautiful. But they also, and importantly, disconcert the viewer, making us uncomfortable, and, in the process, raising questions about the functioning of the image and the construction of subjectivity in contemporary culture." Ledare has continued this examination into personal relationships with works that feature images of his collectors, patrons, and ex-wife, often in sexual situations.

In 2009, Ledare was included in an exhibition Ça Me Touche (Nan's Guests) curated by Nan Goldin in Arles France as part of the annual Rencontres d'Arles photography festival. Writing in The New York Times, Roberta Smith said that Ledare is "taking us deep into the darkness and torment that drive many artists." In the series "Personal Commissions" Ledare "answered personal ads from women whose desires echoed those of his mother's, and paid them to photograph him in their apartments, in a scenario of their choosing."

He has taught at Yale University; California Institute of the Arts; Columbia University, New York; New York University; and the Fondazione Spinola Banna per l’Arte, Italy.

== Publications ==
- Pretend You’re Actually Alive. PPP in collaboration with Andrew Roth, New York, 2008.
- Leigh Ledare, et al. Milan: Mousse, 2012.
- Double Bind. Bruxelles, mfc-michèle didier, 2012. mfc-michèle didier.
- Anna and Carl and some other couples. Nic Guagnini. PPP Editions in collaboration with Andrew Roth, New York, 2014.
- Double Bind Conversations. Co-authored with Rhea Anastas. New York: Art Resources Transfer, 2015.

== Exhibitions ==
- 2009: Ça me touche (Nan's Guests), curated by Nan Goldin, Rencontres d'Arles, France.
- 2010: Nominated and exhibited at the Rencontres d'Arles Discovery Award, France.
- 2010: The Confectioner’s Confectioner, Pilar Corrias Gallery, London.
- 2012: Leigh Ledare et al, WIELS, curated by Elena Filipovich.
- 2012: Double Bind - Leigh Ledare, mfc-michèle didier, Paris
- 2013: Leigh Ledare, et al., Kunsthal Charlottenborg, Denmark
- 2014: Leigh Ledare, Mitchell-Innes and Nash Gallery, New York.
- 2016: The Here and the Now, Manifesta 11, Helmhaus Kunsthalle, Zurich, Switzerland.
- 2016: Place du Jardin aux Fleurs, Office Baroque, Brussels.
- 2017: Vokzal, The Box, Los Angeles.
- 2017: The Plot, Art Institute of Chicago.

== Films ==
- The Task (2017)
