= Marvin Heiferman =

American curator and writer (born 1948)

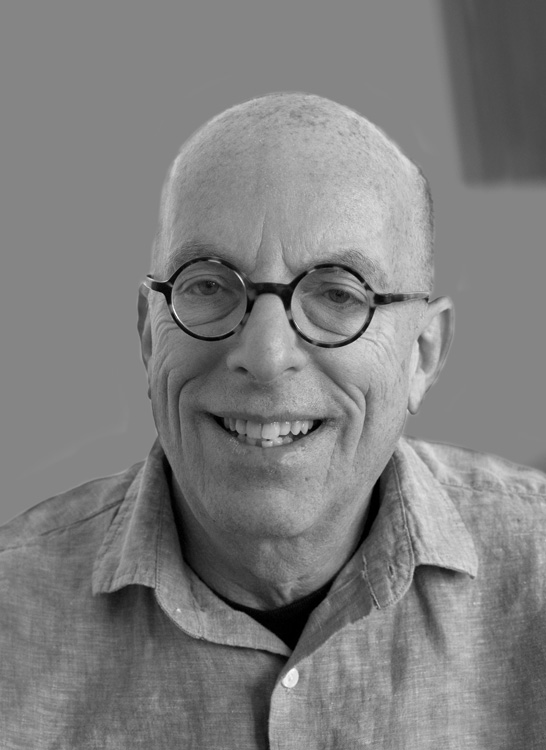
Marvin Heiferman

Marvin Heiferman (born 1948) is an American curator and writer, who originates projects about the impact of photographic images on art, visual culture, and science for museums, art galleries, publishers and corporations.

== Biography ==
As Assistant Director of LIGHT Gallery, New York (1971–1974), Director of Castelli Graphics and Photographs, New York (1975–1982), an artist representative (1982–1988) and an independent curator (1989–present), Heiferman has organized influential thematic exhibitions and worked with a wide range of artists and photographers including Eve Arnold, Garry Winogrand, Robert Mapplethorpe, Stephen Shore, Lewis Baltz, William Eggleston, Robert Adams, Nan Goldin, John Waters, and Richard Prince. Known as an early champion of color, narrative and appropriation (art) photography, Heiferman shifted the focus of his work in the mid-1980s to develop projects explored the impact of mediated and vernacular images on history, society, culture and everyday life. In 1991, Heiferman became a founding partner (with Carole Kismaric) of Lookout, a company that, for a dozen years, produced innovative exhibitions and cultural projects for major museums (including Fame After Photography, Museum of Modern Art, 1999), humanitarian organizations, publishers, and imaging and media corporations.

Since 2002, Heiferman has conceived and produced exhibitions and online content for clients including the New Museum, International Center of Photography, and the Smithsonian Photography Initiative and the Smithsonian Institution Archives. His book, Photography Changes Everything (2012), with features approximately 80 interdisciplinary texts on photography's active role in shaping memory, history, and experience was based on an encyclopedic online project (2008–2011) he organized for the Smithsonian. A contributing editor to Art in America, Heiferman has also written for publications including Artforum, Bomb Magazine, Bookforum, "Photoworks", and ARTnews. He is a core faculty member in the International Center of Photography/Bard College MFA Program in Advanced Photographic Studies, and teaches in the School of Visual Art's MFA Program in Photography, Video and Related Media.

== Selected exhibitions ==
- Bill Wood’s Business (International Center of Photography, 2008)
- Now is Then: Snapshots from the Maresca Collection (The Newark Museum, 2008)
- John Waters: Change of Life (New Museum, 2004)
- Paradise Now: Picturing the Genetic Revolution (Exit Art, 2000)
- Fame After Photography (The Museum of Modern Art, 1999)
- To The Rescue: Eight Artists in an Archive (International Center of Photography, 1999)
- Talking Pictures (International Center of Photography, 1994)
- The Indomitable Spirit, (International Center of Photography, 1990)
- Image World: Art and Media Culture (Whitney Museum of American Art, with Lisa Phillips and John Handhardt, 1989)
- The Real Big Picture (Queens Museum of Art, 1985)
- The Family of Man, 1954–1984 (MoMA PS1, 1984)
- Still Life (Whitney Museum of American Art, with Diane Keaton, 1983)
- Some Color Photographs, (Castelli Graphics, 1977)

== Selected publications ==
- "Photography Changes Everything", Smithsonian Institution/Aperture, New York, 2012
- Bill Wood's Business, ICP/Steidl, New York (2008) with Diane Keaton
- Now is Then: Snapshots from the Maresca Collection, Princeton Architectural Press, New York and The Newark Museum, Newark (2008)
- John Waters: Change of Life, Harry N. Abrams, New York and The New Museum for Contemporary Art, New York (2004)
- Paradise Now: Picturing the Genetic Revolution, The Tang Teaching Museum and Art Gallery, Saratoga Springs (2002) with Lisa Phillips
- Growing Up with Dick and Jane: Living and Learning the American Dream, CollinsSanFrancisco, San Francisco (1996), with Carole Kismaric
- Love is Blind, powerHouse Books, New York (1996), with Carole Kismaric
- I’m So Happy, Vintage Books, New York (1990) with Carole Kismaric
- Image World: Art and Media Culture, The Whitney Museum of American Art, New York (1989) with Lisa Phillips and John Hanhardt
- The Indomitable Spirit, Harry N. Abrams, Inc., New York (1989)
- Still Life, Callaway Editions, New York (1983) and Simon and Schuster, New York (1985), with Diane Keaton.

== Selected Books Edited and Packaged ==
- City Art: New York’s Percent for Art Program, Merrell Publishers, London/New York, Department of Cultural Affairs, City of New York, (2005)
- The Art of the X-Files, Harper Prism, New York, in association with Twentieth Century Fox, and 1013 Productions, Los Angeles (1998)
- Flaming Creature: Jack Smith', His Amazing Life and Times, Serpent’s Tail, London/PS 1 Museum, New York (1997)
- Fay's Fairy Tales: Little Red Riding Hood" and 'Fay's Fairy Tales: Cinderella. Photographs and text by William Wegman Hyperion Books for Children, New York (1993)
- The Ballad of Sexual Dependency, photographs and text by Nan Goldin, Aperture, New York (1986)
- Park City, photographs by Lewis Baltz, essay by Gus Blaisdell, Artspace, Albuquerque/Castelli Graphics, New York/Aperture, New York (1980)

== Online and media projects ==
- Why We Look (2012–), a Twitter-based project that follows breaking news stories about photography and visual culture.
- The Bigger Picture: Photography at the Smithsonian), an interdisciplinary blog, launched in 2009 by the Smithsonian Photography Initiative, that explores Smithsonian photographic archives, assets and issues. Heiferman acted as creative consultant, chief editor, and contributor.
- click! photography changes everythinga web-based project sponsored by the Smithsonian Photography Initiative, invited experts in various fields and the public at large, to explore the power and impact of photography on history, culture and everyday life. Heiferman was editor and creative consultant.
- The Ballad of Sexual Dependency. Producer of Nan Goldin's 800-slide projection presentation with accompanying soundtrack.
- The Electric Blanket December 1, 1990, the first Day Without Art. An outdoor slide projection with music, presented at The Cooper Union, New York. Project director with Nan Goldin and Alan Frame.

== Sources ==
- Woodward, Richard. "Marvin Heiferman's All Encompassing Eye Has Redefined Photography," Vogue, November, pp. 284–87
- Heiferman, Marvin and Laurie Simmons. "Laurie Simmons and Marvin Heiferman” (Conversation), Art in America, (April 3, 2009).
- Johnson, Ken. "A Businessman’s View of Mid-American Life" (Review), The New York Times (May 23, 2008)
- Kimmelman, Michael. "How Photography Makes Celebrity So Irresistible" (Review). The New York Times (July 9, 1999)
- Woodward, Richard B. "Art; Seeking a Suitable Way To Approach the Issue of AIDS" (Review). The New York Times (February 4, 1990).
- Barry, Lynda. "Say ‘Cheese,’ America" The New York Times (April 29, 1990)
- Ostrom, Saul. "Marvin Heiferman" (interview), Bomb (Fall 1989).
- Grundberg, Andy. "Photography View; A Big Show That’s About Something Larger than Size", (review). The New York Times (February 23, 1986)
- "Click! Photography Changes Everything." Jay Prosser. Photography and Culture, Vol. 3, No. 1, March 2010, pp. 119–122.
- Seeing Through Photographs interview with Marvin Heiferman, The Museum of Modern Art
