= Hasselblad Foundation =

Swedish photography foundation

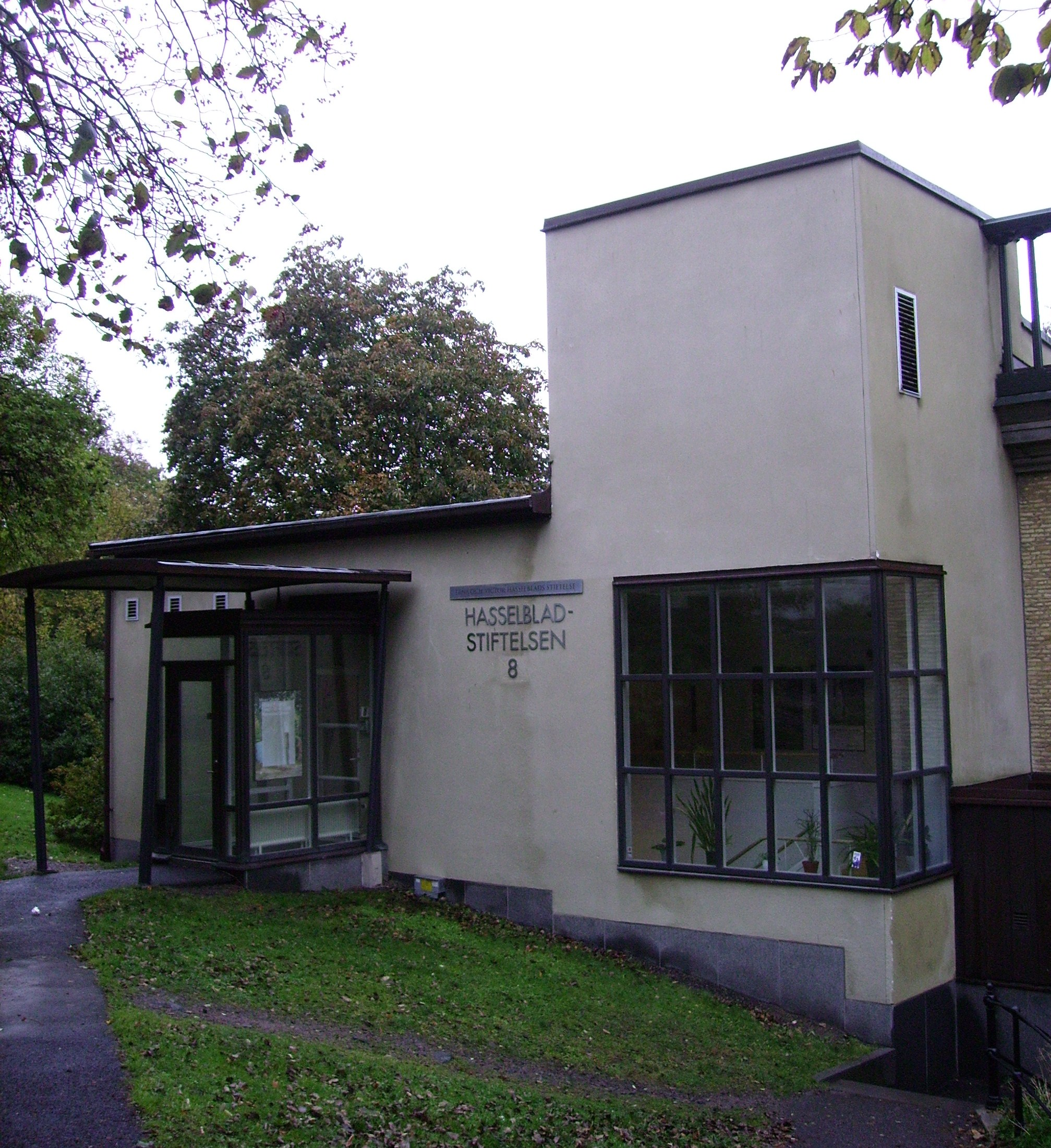
The Hasselblad Foundation, in Gothenburg

The Hasselblad Foundation was established in 1979 at the will of Victor Hasselblad, as a fully independent, not-for-profit foundation based at Götaplatsen in Gothenburg, Sweden. The main aim of the foundation is to promote research and academic teaching in the natural sciences and photography.

== History ==
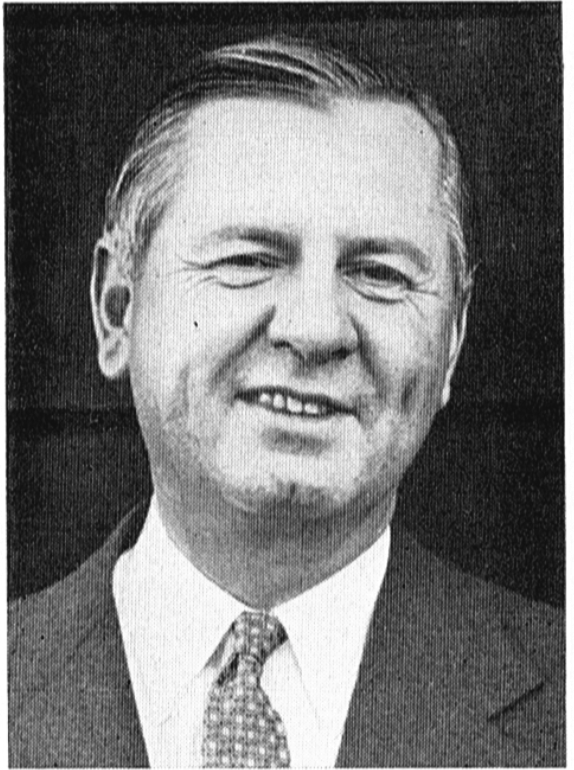
Victor Hasselbad

After the death of Victor Hasselblad in August 1978 it was announced by the Swedish government that he had bequeathed part of his fortune "to establish awards similar to Nobel Prizes," with the Erna and Victor Hasselblad Foundation "awarding prizes of around three million Swedish crowns ($700,000) once a year, or twice this sum every two years, to scientists in the natural sciences." At the time the sum corresponded to the annual Nobel prize awards for science and literature. The first grant, 500,000 Swedish Kronor in that instance, went to Sweden's Royal Institute of Technology's Department of Photography, then the country's only scientific research and teaching institution in the field of photography.

=== Erna and Victor Hasselblad Photography Center ===
In accord with its origin in the manufacture of innovative cameras, the Foundation also conducts its own research into photography at its Hasselblad Center, which opened in 1989, with Rune Hassner as the organisation's first head 1988–94, and it continues to exhibit Swedish and International photography. On Hassner's initiative the Center commenced a collection with a concentration on the work of Nordic photographers, among them Sune Jonsson, Christer Strömholm, Adriana Lestido, Pål-Nils Nilsson.

The Center's purpose is to promote education in photography through research projects, seminars and lectures, and its library and archives for students and researchers. The Hasselblad Foundation's research library opened in 1999, initiated with Hassner's own extensive library which he donated in 1998.

Among these actives American ornithologist-photographer Don Walte in 1988 was granted $21.000 Foundation to photograph birds with a video camera sharing a viewfinder with the Hasselblad camera, opening a new career as a film maker.

=== Hasselblad Foundation International Award in Photography ===
The Foundation also presents an annual international award in photography to "a photographer recognised for major achievements", exhibiting their work at the Center and publishing monographs on each.

The first prize, 100,000 Swedish kronor and a gold medal, was awarded in November 1980 to Lennart Nilsson for his imagery of medicine and nature. Other winners included Ernst Haas, Édouard Boubat, Manuel Álvarez Bravo, Robert Häusser, Henri Cartier-Bresson, Hiroshi Hamaya, William Klein, Sebastião Salgado, Susan Meiselas, and Boris Mikhailov.

== Photography stipends ==
=== The Victor Fellowships ===
Awards continuous professional and artistic development outside the Nordic region since 2004. Two stipend winners are announced annually, one from United Kingdom and another one from New York.

=== The Grez-sur-Loing stipend ===
Awards Scandinavian photographers, or Scandinavians working abroad, with a residency located in Grez-sur-Loing near Fontainebleau, France. The awarded photographer is accommodated at the Hôtel Chevillon, restored by the Grez-sur-Loing Foundation. The Grez-sur-Loing stipends have been awarded since 1994.

=== The San Michele stipend ===
Targeting Swedish photographers, the winner of this stipend will follow in the footsteps of Swedish physician Axel Munthe, awarded with an international stay at Axel Munthe's Villa San Michele located on Capri, an island in the southern part of Italy.

=== Stipend in Nature Photography ===
A stipend established to encourage Nordic nature photography, based on Victor Hasselblad's own interest in nature. In collaboration with Vårgårda Photo Club. First to be awarded was Swedish photographer Marcus Elmerstad.

Year	Stipend	Project	Stipend sum
2008	Marcus Elmerstad	"The Pilgrim Road to Nidaros"	SEK 100,000
2008	Karolina Tillman	"Fairyland – Nordic Legends"	SEK 10,000
2010	Daniel Månsson	"Waves"	SEK 100,000

=== Postdoctor in photography ===
The Hasselblad Foundation offers a postdoctoral position in photography to support advanced research and academic work in the field. The postdoctoral program is designed to strengthen scholarly knowledge in photography and contributes to the Foundation's broader mission of promoting photography as both an art and a scientific discipline.

== Science ==
In keeping with Victor Hasselblad's bequest, the Foundation also supports research in the natural sciences. These activities are conducted separately from the photography programmes and reflect his wish to create awards comparable to the Nobel Prizes in the sciences.

=== Science grants ===
The Hasselblad Foundation awards science grants to support research projects in the natural sciences. These grants are intended to fund specific research initiatives and are awarded on a competitive basis to researchers and institutions working in fields aligned with the Foundation's scientific aims.

=== Visiting professorship ===
The Foundation supports a visiting professorship in the natural sciences, enabling leading researchers from around the world to conduct work in Sweden. The programme is designed to foster international academic exchange and bring expertise to Swedish scientific institutions.

=== Science stipends ===
The Hasselblad Foundation provides stipends to support scientists working in the natural sciences. These stipends are part of the Foundation's commitment to Victor Hasselblad's original vision of funding scientific excellence, and complement the photography stipends offered under the Foundation's arts programme.

== See also ==
- Hasselblad Masters Award
- Hasselblad Award
