= Hasselblad Award =

International photography award

The Hasselblad Award (in full: Hasselblad Foundation International Award in Photography) is an award granted to "a photographer recognized for major achievements".

== History ==
First awarded in 1980, the award—and the Hasselblad Foundation—was set up from the estate of Erna and Victor Hasselblad. Victor Hasselblad was the inventor of the Hasselblad Camera System.

The award includes a cash prize of SEK 2,000,000 (€200,000), a gold medal, diploma, and an exhibition at the Hasselblad Center in the Göteborg Museum of Art in Gothenburg, Sweden.

== Winners ==
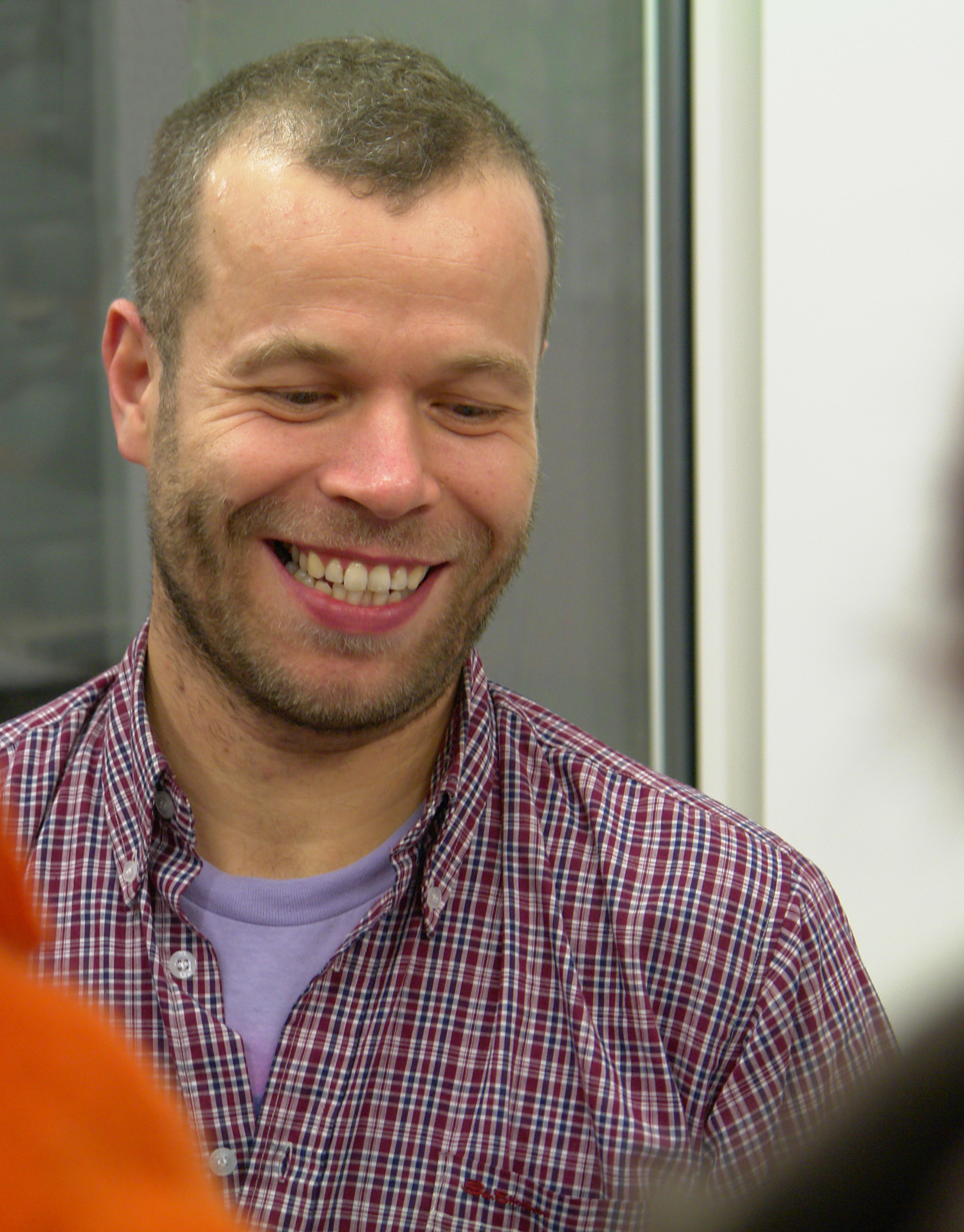
Wolfgang Tillmans, Recipient 2015

- 1980 Lennart Nilsson
- 1981 Ansel Adams
- 1982 Henri Cartier-Bresson
- 1984 Manuel Álvarez Bravo
- 1985 Irving Penn
- 1986 Ernst Haas
- 1987 Hiroshi Hamaya
- 1988 Édouard Boubat
- 1989 Sebastião Salgado
- 1991 Richard Avedon
- 1990 William Klein
- 1992 Josef Koudelka
- 1993 Sune Jonsson
- 1994 Susan Meiselas
- 1995 Robert Häusser
- 1996 Robert Frank
- 1997 Christer Strömholm
- 1998 William Eggleston
- 1999 Cindy Sherman
- 2000 Boris Mikhailov
- 2001 Hiroshi Sugimoto
- 2002 Jeff Wall
- 2003 Malick Sidibé
- 2004 Bernd and Hilla Becher
- 2005 Lee Friedlander
- 2006 David Goldblatt
- 2007 Nan Goldin
- 2008 Graciela Iturbide
- 2009 Robert Adams
- 2010 Sophie Calle
- 2011 Walid Raad
- 2012 Paul Graham
- 2013 Joan Fontcuberta
- 2014 Miyako Ishiuchi
- 2015 Wolfgang Tillmans
- 2016 Stan Douglas
- 2017 Rineke Dijkstra
- 2018 Oscar Muñoz
- 2019 Daidō Moriyama
- 2020 Alfredo Jaar
- 2022 Dayanita Singh
- 2023 Carrie Mae Weems
- 2024 Ingrid Pollard
- 2025 Sophie Ristelhueber
- 2026 Zanele Muholi
