= Stephen Tashjian =

American artist (born 1959)

- Born: 1959 (age 66–67); Leicester, Massachusetts, U.S.
- Other name: Tabboo!
- Education: Massachusetts College of Art
- Known for: Multimedia art; painting; puppetry; graphic design; performance art

Stephen Tashjian (born 1959) is an American multimedia artist. His drag queen character Tabboo! became first known at the Pyramid Club in the East Village underground art scene of New York City in the 1980s. He is also a puppeteer, painter, and singer.

== Biography ==
Stephen Tashjian was born in 1959 and raised in the central Massachusetts town of Leicester. He is from an Armenian American family. Tashjian attended the Massachusetts College of Art in Boston where he became friends with fellow students Nan Goldin and Jack Pierson.

He moved to New York's East Village in 1982 to pursue a career as an artist, and became a regular performer at the Pyramid Club, appearing next to other drag legends like Rupaul and Lady Bunny. Tashjian also performed several times at the annual Wigstock drag event, and appeared in Wigstock, The Movie, released in 1995. He also appeared as a contestant in Howard Stern's 1994 New Year's Rotten Eve Beauty Pageant.

Tashjian has painted murals on city buildings and exhibited his paintings in many galleries internationally. Under the name Tabboo!, he designed flyers, record album covers and advertising for underground venues. One of his better known artworks is his graphic design for the album cover of Deee-Lite's World Clique. The curly lettering on the album cover became an iconic image for the band and the rave culture of the early 1990s.

The photographer Nan Goldin included photographs of Tabboo! in her books, and he is featured on the cover of her book The Other Side in drag.

Tashjian continues to perform in New York and shows his paintings in art shows, most notably a 2006 group show curated by Jack Pierson at Paul Kasmin Gallery in New York, featuring dozens of camp art pieces from his private collection. The show featured works by Matthew Barney, Nan Goldin, David Armstrong, Jack Pierson, and Mark Morrisroe.

In 2004 Tashjian's work was documented in the New Museum's art exhibition East Village USA and in 2006 at New York University (NYU)/Grey Art Gallery's 2006 art exhibition The Downtown Show : The New York Art Scene 1974-1984.
