= Jack Pierson =

American artist (born 1960)

- Born: 1960 (age 65–66); Plymouth, Massachusetts, U.S.
- Education: Massachusetts College of Art and Design (BFA, 1984)
- Known for: Photography; word sculptures; collage; installation art
- Movement: Boston School
- Website: jackpiersonstudio.com

Jack Pierson (born 1960 in Plymouth, Massachusetts) is an American artist and gallerist. Pierson is known for his photographs, collages, word sculptures, installations, drawings, and artist's books. His works are held in numerous museum collections.

== Early life and education ==
Pierson graduated from Massachusetts College of Art and Design in 1984 with a bachelor's in fine arts. He spent his last year of college at Cooper Union as part of an exchange program.

== Artistic practice ==
Pierson's practice encompasses wall drawings, word pieces, installations, drawings, paintings, and photographs. For the project The Source, artist Doug Aitken filmed a conversation with Pierson exploring the essence of his creative process.

=== Work ===
==== Photography ====
Pierson is considered part of a group of photographers known as the Boston School, which includes David Armstrong, Philip-Lorca diCorcia, Nan Goldin, Mark Morrisroe, and twins Doug and Mike Starn, among others. All of them knew one another in the early 1980s and photographed their immediate circle of friends in situations that were, or appeared to be, casual or intimate.

Self-Portrait #4 (2003), from Pierson's Self Portrait series, exhibited at the 2004 Whitney Biennial

In 2003, Pierson published Self Portrait, a book of photographs featuring 15 images of men arranged to suggest the arc of a lifetime, beginning with a young boy and progressing to old age; none of the images is of the artist himself. His "Self-Portrait" series was shown in the 2004 Whitney Biennial.

Pierson's work is regularly commissioned for magazines, and he has undertaken photography projects for several luxury fashion houses. Commissioned by the Italian luxury label Bottega Veneta, he photographed models Liya Kebede, Karmen Pedaru, and Alexandre Cunha for the 2012 spring/summer ad campaign in Coconut Grove, Florida.

==== Word sculptures ====
Pierson began making his Word Sculptures in 1991, utilizing found objects: mismatched letters salvaged from junkyards, old movie marquees, roadside diners, Las Vegas casinos, and other forsaken enterprises. These works spell out individual words or phrases.

In 2025, the Obama Foundation commissioned Pierson to create a sculpture spelling out "hope", one of President Barack Obama's core campaign slogans, with found letters for the Obama Presidential Center in Chicago.

==== Video ====
Commissioned in 1997 by the artistic collective Bernadette Corporation, Pierson's video Past Life in Egypt is a collaboration with Ursula Hodel, who plays a glamorous dominatrix recounting her past life as a queen of Egypt.

==== Paintings and drawings ====
In 2006, inspired by an earlier series of pencil drawings from an old postcard of a woman's face, Pierson produced a suite of twelve large-scale silkscreen paintings: linear graphics in black ink on off-white linen.

In a group of what Pierson refers to as "first page drawings", he copies the first page of books by Barbara Pym, Jean Rhys, Sister Wendy, and Marilyn Monroe, among others, on 11 by 14 inches (28 cm × 36 cm) paper.

=== Collections ===
Pierson's work is held in public collections internationally, including:

- Art Institute of Chicago
- Irish Museum of Modern Art
- Los Angeles County Museum of Art
- Los Angeles Museum of Contemporary Art
- Metropolitan Museum of Art
- Museum of Contemporary Art Chicago
- Museum of Contemporary Art North Miami
- Museum of Modern Art
- San Francisco Museum of Modern Art
- Wadsworth Atheneum Museum of Art
- Whitney Museum of American Art

=== Art market ===
Pierson is represented by Xavier Hufkens, Thaddaeus Ropac, Regen Projects, and Lisson Gallery (since 2022).

== Elliott Templeton Fine Arts ==
In 2023, Pierson opened an art gallery in Chinatown, New York, intended as an "homage to the gay shopkeepers who thrived downtown in the '80s and '90s", and described by Hilton Als as "a jewel box of a space devoted to delicate ideas strongly executed." Its interior was designed by Fernando Santangelo. In 2025, the gallery opened a location in Miami.

Its name is taken from a character in The Razor's Edge by W. Somerset Maugham, of whom Pierson said, "They didn't say he was homosexual but you just knew."

== Personal life ==
Pierson is openly gay.
