= Robert Häusser =

German photographer

- Born: 8 November 1924; Stuttgart, Germany
- Died: 5 August 2013 (aged 88); Mannheim, Germany
- Known for: photography

Robert Häusser (8 November 1924 – 5 August 2013) was a German photographer.

Häusser's career as a photographer began in post-war Germany during his time working on a farm. Consequentially many of his first studies included farm landscapes and workers. After moving to Mannheim he entered into what art historians have dubbed his "light period" (1953–54) due to the "light, often poetic" nature of many of his photographs taken during this time.

He exhibited at more than 50 one-man-shows in museums and art galleries in Germany, France, Spain, the Netherlands, Russia, Slovenia, and the USA.

He received the Hasselblad Award in 1995. His award citation described his work as "extension and development of the 'subjective photography' genre, which was launched, and won considerable acclaim, in Europe during the post-war years. His graphic and pregnant studies of landscapes and architecture combine a fine simplification of the essentials of his subjects with a quietly threatening tone".

== Awards ==
- Hasselblad Award (1995)
- David Octavius Hill Medal (1984)
