= Sune Jonsson =

Swedish photographer and writer

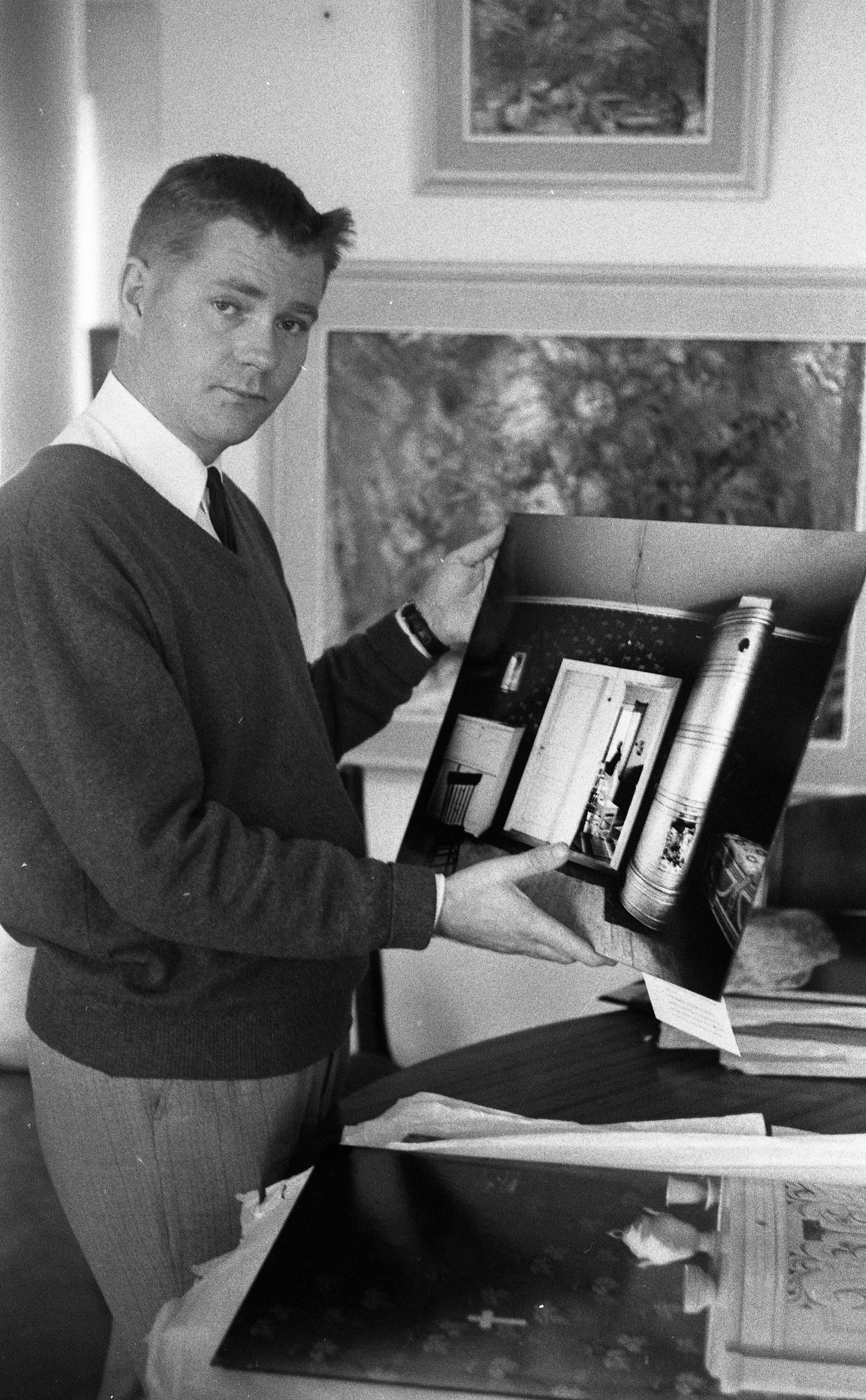
Sune Jonsson at his photographic exhibition in Vaasa, Finland, 1967.

Olov Sune Jonsson (20 December 1930 – 30 January 2009) was a Swedish documentary photographer and writer, recipient of the Hasselblad Award in 1993.

Jonsson was born in Nyåker outside Nordmaling in the province of Västerbotten, Sweden. After studying folklore and literature in Stockholm and Uppsala, Jonsson returned in the early 1960s to northern Sweden. His debut book Byn med det blå huset (The village with the blue house) was published in 1959 and includes personal portrays of people in Djupsjönäs and his native village Nyåker. As in his second photobook, Timotejvägen, the relationship between text and image play an important role.

Between 1961 and 1995, Jonsson was hired as a photographer at the Museum of Västerbotten in Umeå, where he became dedicated to long-term cultural photographic works, mainly in the province of Västerbotten. Thematically, his photography was focused on the rural population, farmers, the man-made landscape and religious gatherings. Jonsson's artistic visual production was inspired by photographers such as August Sander, Walker Evans, Dorothea Lange, Wayne Miller and Edward Steichen, notably in the photo exhibition The Family of Man in 1955. Swedish writer Ivar Lo-Johansson and his social work Den sociala fotobildboken was an important role model.

In addition to his photographic work, Jonsson was a skilled documentary film maker and he produced, in cooperation with the Museum of Västerbotten and Swedish television, documentary films about small farms, mining and fishing in the sparsely populated northern Sweden.

== Bibliography ==
- Byn med det blå huset (1959)
- Timotejvägen (1961)
- Hundhålet (1962)
- Bilder av Nådens barn (1963)
- Bilder från den stora flyttningen (1964)
- Bilder av Kongo (1965)
- Sammankomst i elden (1966)
- Bilder från bondens år (1967)
- Bilder från Bornholm (1967)
- Prag augusti 1968 (1968)
- Brobyggarna (1969)
- Minnesbok över den svenske bonden (1971)
- Stationskarl Albin E. Anderssons minnen (1974)
- Jordabok (1976)
- Örtabok (1979)
- Dagar vid havet (1981)
- Blombok (1983)
- Hemmavid (1986)
- Tiden viskar – en småbrukarfamilj 1960–1990 (1991)
- Sune Jonsson – Photographs by the recipient of the Hasselblad Prize (1993)
- Jordgubbar med mjölk (1994)
- Husen vid Himlastigen (1998)
- Album – fotografier från fem decennier (2000)
- Tiden blir ett förunderligt ting. Fotografier av människor och landskap (2007)
- And Times becomes a Wondrous Thing (2007)
- Livstycken (2014)
- Life and work (2014)
