= David Armstrong (photographer) =

American photographer (1954–2014)

- Born: David Bradley Armstrong; May 24, 1954; Arlington, Massachusetts, U.S.
- Died: October 26, 2014 (aged 60); Los Angeles, California, U.S.
- Education: School of the Museum of Fine Arts, Boston; Cooper Union; Tufts University (BFA)
- Occupation: Photographer
- Years active: 1977–2014
- Known for: Intimate portraits

David Bradley Armstrong (May 24, 1954 – October 26, 2014) was an American photographer based in New York.

Armstrong first exhibited his work in 1977 and had one-person shows in New York City, Boston, Berlin, Paris, Rome, Zurich, Düsseldorf, Lisbon, Munich, and Amsterdam. His work was included in numerous group museum exhibitions including the 1995 Whitney Biennial, Emotions and Relations at the Hamburger Kunsthalle in 1998, and Photography in Boston: 1955–1985 at the DeCordova Museum in Lincoln in 2000.

== Personal life ==
Armstrong was born in 1954, in Arlington, Massachusetts, one of four sons of Robert and Irma Armstrong. He graduated from the Satya Community School, an alternative high school in Lincoln, Massachusetts, where he met Nan Goldin at the age of 14. David openly identified as gay. On October 26, 2014, at the age of 60, he died in Los Angeles, California due to liver cancer.

== Career ==
Armstrong entered into the School of the Museum of Fine Arts in Boston as a painting major, but soon switched to photography after studying alongside Goldin, with whom he shared an apartment. He attended the School of the Museum of Fine Arts and Cooper Union from 1974 to 1978, and he earned a B.F.A from Tufts University in 1988 and Judy Ann Goldman Fine Art in Boston.

During the late 1970s, Armstrong became associated with the "Boston School" of photography, which included artists such as Nan Goldin, Mark Morrisroe, and Jack Pierson.

Armstrong first received critical attention for his intimate black-and-white portraits of men, lovers, and friends, which were shown at PS1's 1981 New York/New Wave exhibition and later published prominently in the monograph "The Silver Cord."

In 1996, Goldin and Elisabeth Sussman, curator of photographs at the Whitney Museum, enlisted Armstrong's help in composing Goldin's first retrospective. Sussman gained such respect for Armstrong’s eye that she acquired a few of his pieces for the Whitney permanent collection, and he was subsequently featured in the Whitney 1994 biennial.

Armstrong’s work has also appeared in publications such as Vogue Paris, L'Uomo Vogue, Arena Homme +, GQ, Self Service, Another Man and Japanese Vogue and he has worked on the advertising campaigns of companies such as Zegna, René Lezard, Kenneth Cole, Burberry, Puma, and Barbara Bui. He once shot editorials for Wonderland, Vogue Hommes and Purple.

Although he is best known today for his portraits of boys and men, Armstrong's first solo show at Matthew Marks Gallery in 1995 was titled Landscapes. He also released a book of land and cityscapes in soft focus, entitled All Day, Every Day.

== Publications ==
- with Nan Goldin.A Double Life. Scalo, Zurich/New York 1994, ISBN 978-1-881616-21-4.
- The Silver Cord. Afterword by Nan Goldin. Scalo, Zurich/New York 1997. ISBN 978-3-931141-48-6.
- All Day Every Day. Edited by Martin Jaeggi, with a conversation by Armstrong and Jaeggi. Scalo, Zurich/New York 2002, ISBN 978-3-908247-56-2.
- 615 Jefferson Avenue. Edited by Nick Vogelson and Anton Aparin, introduction by Boyd Holbrook. Damiani, Bologna 2011, ISBN 978-88-6208-178-8.
- Night and Day. Poem and cover artwork by Rene Ricard. Edition of 1000. Mörel, London 2015, ISBN 978-1-907071-28-7.
- Polaroids. Edition of 1000. Mörel, London 2015, ISBN 978-1-907071-41-6.

== Exhibitions ==
=== Gallery shows ===
- Nan Goldin and David Armstrong: A Double Life, Matthew Marks Gallery, New York City, 1993 (book, see Publications above)
- Landscapes, Matthew Marks Gallery, New York City, 1995
- The Silver Cord, Matthew Marks Gallery, New York City, 1997 (book, see Publications above)
- Galerie Rob Jurka, Amsterdam, the Netherlands, 1998
- Ugo Ferranti, Rome, Italy, 1998
- New Photographs, Matthew Marks Gallery, New York City, 1999
- Scalo New York, New York City, 1999
- Galerie Fricke, Berlin, Germany, 1999
- Judy Goldman Fine Art, Boston, 1999
- Bang Street Gallery, Provincetown, Massachusetts, 1999
- João Graça, Lisbon, Portugal, 2000
- Open Studio, Toronto, Canada, 2000
- New Editions, Marlborough Graphics, New York City, 2000
- Faces, Bang Street Gallery, Provincetown, Massachusetts, 2000
- Cityscapes and Landscapes, Galerie M+R Fricke, Düsseldorf, Germany, 2001
- Bang Street Gallery, Provincetown, Massachusetts, 2001
- City: Prints and Photographs from the 30s through Today, Brooke Alexander, New York City, 2001
- Places and People, Galerie Lothar Albrecht, Frankfurt, Germany, 2001
- Building Dwelling Thinking, Judy Ann Goldman Fine Art, Boston, 2001
- Tenth Anniversary Exhibition: 100 Drawings and Photographs, Matthew Marks Gallery, New York City, 2001 (catalogue, ISBN 978-1-880146-34-7)
- City Light, Matthew Marks Gallery, New York City, 2002
- David Armstrong: All Day Every Day, Scalo Galerie, Zurich, Switzerland, 2002
- David Armstrong: portraits and other works, early and recent, Galerie M + R Fricke, Düsseldorf, 2003
- Flesh Tones: 100 Years of the Nude, Robert Mann Gallery, New York City, 2003
- Your Picture on My Wall, Matthew Marks Gallery, New York City, 2004
- Indigestible Correctness II, Kenny Schachter Gallery, New York City, 2004
- Model Boy, Judy Ann Goldman Fine Art, Boston, 2006
- Some Tribes, Christophe Guye Galerie, Zurich, Switzerland, 2006
- David Armstrong, Artists Space, New York City, 2026

=== Institutional group shows ===
- Emotions and Relations, "Five from Boston": Goldin, Armstrong, Mark Morrisroe, Jack Pierson and Philip-Lorca diCorcia, curated by F. C. Gundlach. Hamburger Kunsthalle, Hamburg, Germany, 1998 (catalogue: Taschen, Cologne 1998, ISBN 3-82287507-4)
- Photography in Boston: 1955–1985, DeCordova Museum and Sculpture Park, Lincoln, Massachusetts, 2000 (catalogue, ISBN 978-0-262-12229-0)
- Visions from America. Photographs from the Whitney Museum of American Art, 1940–2001, Whitney Museum, New York City, 2002 (catalogue, ISBN 978-3-7913-2787-7)
- Recent Acquisitions, Dallas Museum of Art, Texas, 2002
- Likeness: Portraits of Artists by Other Artists, Wattis Institute for Contemporary Arts, San Francisco, 2004
- True Romance - Allegorien der Liebe von der Renaissance bis heute, Kunsthalle Wien, Vienna, 2007/08, subsequently Kunsthalle Kiel and Villa Stuck, Munich (catalogue, ISBN 978-3-8321-9049-1)
