= The Ballad of Sexual Dependency =

Photography collection

The Ballad of Sexual Dependency (1986). The image on the cover is "Nan and Brian in Bed" (1983).

The Ballad of Sexual Dependency is a 1985 slide show exhibition and 1986 artist's book publication of photographs taken between 1979 and 1986 by photographer Nan Goldin. Consisting of over 700 images, it is an autobiographical document of a portion of New York City's No wave music and art scene, the post-Stonewall gay subculture of the late 1970s and early 1980s, the heroin subculture of the Bowery neighborhood, and Goldin's personal family and love life.

Critic Sean O'Hagan, writing in The Guardian in 2014, said it "remains a benchmark for all other work in a similar confessional vein." Lucy Davies, writing in The Telegraph in 2014, said it "would come to influence a generation of fledgling photographers, who fell into her truth-telling wake. She was credited by Bill Clinton with inventing heroin chic".

== Details ==
The title The Ballad of Sexual Dependency was adapted from a song in Bertolt Brecht's Threepenny Opera.

It was originally devised as a slideshow set to the music of Velvet Underground, James Brown, Nina Simone, Charles Aznavour, Screamin' Jay Hawkins and Petula Clark among others, to entertain Goldin's friends. It "portrayed her friends – many of them part of the hard-drugs subculture on New York's Lower East Side – as they partied, got high, fought and had sex. It was first publicly shown at the Whitney Biennial in New York in 1985 and was published as a photobook the following year."

The snapshot aesthetic book was first published with help from Marvin Heiferman, Mark Holborn, and Suzanne Fletcher in 1986.

== Solo exhibitions ==
- 1985: The Ballad of Sexual Dependency, screening. Whitney Museum of American Art.
- 1987: The Ballad of Sexual Dependency, screening. Rencontres d'Arles, Arles, France.
- 2009: The Ballad of Sexual Dependency, exhibition and screening, Guest of honour at Rencontres d'Arles, Arles, France.
- 2016: The Ballad of Sexual Dependency, exhibition and screening. Museum of Modern Art, New York.
- 2017: The Ballad of Sexual Dependency, exhibition and screening. Portland Museum of Art, Portland, Maine.
- 2019: NAN GOLDIN - The Ballad of Sexual Dependency, display and screening. Tate Modern, London.

== Publications ==
- The Ballad of Sexual Dependency.
  - New York, NY: Aperture, 1986. ISBN 978-0-89381-236-2.
  - New York, NY: Aperture, 2012. Hardback ISBN 978-1-59711-208-6. Paperback ISBN 978-1-59711-210-9.

== Collections ==
The Ballad of Sexual Dependency is held in the following permanent collection:

- Tate, UK
