= Philip-Lorca diCorcia =

American photographer

- Born: 1953 (age 72–73); Hartford, Connecticut, US
- Education: School of the Museum of Fine Arts, Boston; Yale University
- Known for: Photography
- Notable work: Strangers (1993; later exhibited as Hustlers in 2013)

Philip-Lorca diCorcia (born 1953) is an American photographer, living in New York City. He teaches at Yale University in New Haven, Connecticut.

== Early life and education ==
DiCorcia was born in 1953 in Hartford, Connecticut. His father, Philip Joseph DiCorcia, a major architect in Hartford, operated Philip J. DiCorcia Associates. The DiCorcia family is of Italian descent, having moved to the United States from Abruzzo. He attended the School of the Museum of Fine Arts, Boston, where he earned a diploma in 1975 and a 5th year certificate in 1976. Afterwards diCorcia attended Yale University, where he received a Master of Fine Arts in photography in 1979.

== Work ==
Brent Booth, 21 years old, Des Moines, Iowa, $30

DiCorcia alternates between informal snapshots and iconic quality staged compositions that often have a baroque theatricality.

Using a carefully planned staging, he takes everyday occurrences beyond the realm of banality, trying to inspire in his picture's spectators an awareness of the psychology and emotion contained in real-life situations. His work could be described as documentary photography mixed with the fictional world of cinema and advertising, which creates a powerful link between reality, fantasy and desire.

During the late 1970s, during diCorcia's early career, he used to situate his friends and family within fictional interior tableaus, that would make the viewer think that the pictures were spontaneous shots of someone's everyday life, when they were in fact carefully staged and pre-planned. His work from this period is associated with the Boston School of photography. He would later start photographing random people in urban spaces all around the world. When in Berlin, Calcutta, Hollywood, New York, Rome and Tokyo, he would often hide lights in the pavement, which would illuminate a random subject, often isolating them from the other people in the street.

His photographs give a sense of heightened drama to accidental poses, unintended movements and insignificant facial expressions of those passing by. Even if sometimes the subject appears to be completely detached from the world around them, diCorcia has often used the city of the subject's name as the title of the photo, placing the passers-by back into the city's anonymity. Each of his series, Hustlers, Streetwork, Heads, A Storybook Life, and Lucky Thirteen, can be considered progressive explorations of diCorcia's formal and conceptual fields of interest. Besides his family, associates and random people he has also photographed personas already theatrically enlarged by their life choices, such as the pole dancers in his latest series.

His pictures have black humor within them, and have been described as "Rorschach-like", since they can have a different interpretation depending on the viewer. As they are pre-planned, diCorcia often plants in his concepts issues like the marketing of reality, the commodification of identity, art, and morality.

In 1989, financed by a National Endowment for the Arts fellowship of $45,000, DiCorcia began his Hustlers project. Starting in the early 1990s, he made five trips to Los Angeles to photograph male prostitutes in Hollywood. He used a 6×9 Linhof view camera, which he positioned in advance with Polaroid tests. At first, he photographed his subjects only in motel rooms. Later, he moved onto the streets. When the Museum of Modern Art exhibited 25 of the photographs in 1993 under the title Strangers, each was labeled with the name of the man who posed, his hometown, his age, and the amount of money that changed hands.

In 1999, diCorcia set up his camera on a tripod in Times Square, attached strobe lights to scaffolding across the street and took a series of pictures of strangers passing under his lights. This resulted in two published books, Streetwork (1998) which showed wider views including subjects' entire bodies, and Heads (2001), which featured more closely cropped portraits as the name implies.

Originally published in W as a result of a collaboration with Dennis Freedman between 1997 and 2008, diCorcia produced a series of fashion stories in places such as Havana, Cairo and New York.

== Publications ==
- Philip-Lorca diCorcia. New York: Museum of Modern Art, 1995; 2003. ISBN 0870701452. With a text by Peter Galassi.
- Streetwork, 1993–1997. Spain: Centro de Fotografía and Ediciones Universidad de Salamanca, 1998. With texts by JoséLuis Brea and diCorcia. Exhibition catalogue.
  - Streetwork. Mexico City: Galeria OMR, 2000. Exhibition catalogue.
  - Streetwork. With a text by Thomas Weski. Hannover: Sprengel Museum, 2000. Exhibition catalogue.
- Heads. Göttingen: Steidl, 2001. ISBN 3882434414. With text by Luc Sante. Exhibition catalogue.
- Rencontres 6: Philip-Lorca diCorcia. Paris: Images Modernes, 2001. With a text by Jeff Rian.
- A Storybook Life. Santa Fe, NM: Twin Palms, 2003.
- Lucky Thirteen. New York: PaceWildenstein, 2005.
- Philip-Lorca diCorcia. Steidl/Institute of Contemporary Art, Boston, 2007. ISBN 3865213855. With a text by Bennett Simpson, a foreword by Jill Medvedow, and an interview with diCorcia by Lynne Tillman. Exhibition catalogue.
- Thousand. New York and Göttingen, Germany: SteidlDangin, 2007.
- Eleven. Bologna, Italy: Freedman Damiani, 2011. Edited by Dennis Freedman. With text by Mary Gaitskill and an interview with diCorcia by Jeff Rian.
- Hustlers. New York and Göttingen, Germany: SteidlDangin, 2013. ISBN 978-3-86930-617-9. With a text by diCorcia.
- Philip-Lorca diCorcia. Edited by Katharina Dohm, Hendrik Driessen, and Max Hollein. With texts by Dohm and Geoff Dyer, and an interview with diCorcia by Christoph Ribbat. Schirn Kunsthalle Frankfurt; Bielefeld, Germany: Kerber. Exhibition catalogue.
- Philip-Lorca diCorcia: III Premio Internacional de Fotografía/III International Photography Award. Madrid: Centro de Arte Alcobendas, 2014. With texts by Martinez de Corral, Ignacio Garcia de Vinuesa, Luis Miguel Torres Hernandez, and Christoph Ribbat. Exhibition catalogue.

== Exhibitions ==
=== Solo exhibitions ===
- 1993: Museum of Modern Art, New York
- 1994: Centre national de la photographie, Paris
- 1997: Museo Nacional Centro de Arte Reina Sofía, Madrid
- 2000: Sprengel Museum, Hannover
- 2000: Art Space Ginza, Tokyo
- 2003: Whitechapel Art Gallery, London
- 2009: Thousand, David Zwirner Gallery, New York. One thousand actual-size reproductions of diCorcia's Polaroids.
- 2014: The Hepworth Wakefield, Wakefield, UK. His first UK retrospective.
- 2015: Roid, Sprüth Magers, London, 2011. A series of diCorcia's Polaroids.

=== Group exhibitions ===
- Pleasures and Terrors of Domestic Comfort traveling exhibition organized by Museum of Modern Art, 1991
- 1997 Whitney Biennial, Whitney Museum of American Art
- Cruel and Tender, Tate Modern, London, 2003
- Fashioning Fiction in Photography Since 1990, Museum of Modern Art, New York, 2004
- Carnegie Museum of Art's 54th Carnegie International exhibition, Pittsburgh, Pennsylvania

== Collections ==
DiCorcia's work is held in the following public collections:

- Bibliothèque Nationale, Paris
- Centre Georges Pompidou, Paris
- Museum Folkwang, Essen
- Museum of Modern Art, New York
- Solomon R. Guggenheim Museum, New York
- Victoria & Albert Museum, London
- Whitney Museum of American Art, New York
- San Francisco Museum of Modern Art
- Metropolitan Museum of Art, New York

== Awards ==
- 1987: John Simon Guggenheim Memorial Foundation Fellowship
- 1998: Alfred Eisenstaedt Award, Life Magazine, Style Essay
- 2001: Infinity Award for Applied Photography, International Center of Photography
- 2013: III International Photography Award Alcobendas, Spain
- 2021: Induction into the International Photography Hall of Fame and Museum

== Litigation ==
In 2006, a New York trial court issued a ruling in a case involving one of his photographs. One of diCorcia's New York random subjects was Erno Nussenzweig, an Orthodox Jew who objected on religious grounds to diCorcia's publishing in an artistic exhibition a photograph taken of him without his permission. The photo's subject argued that his privacy and religious rights had been violated by both the taking and publishing of the photograph of him. The judge dismissed the lawsuit, finding that the photograph taken of Nussenzweig on a street is art - not commerce - and therefore is protected by the First Amendment.

Manhattan state Supreme Court Justice Judith J. Gische ruled that the photo of Nussenzweig—a head shot showing him sporting a scraggly white beard, a black hat and a black coat—was art, even though the photographer sold 10 prints of it at $20,000 to $30,000 each. The judge ruled that New York courts have "recognized that art can be sold, at least in limited editions, and still retain its artistic character (...) [F]irst [A]mendment protection of art is not limited to only starving artists. A profit motive in itself does not necessarily compel a conclusion that art has been used for trade purposes."

The case was appealed and dismissed on procedural grounds.

== General references ==
- Unfamiliar Streets. Katherine A. Bussard. The Photographs of Richard Avedon, Charles Moore, Martha Rosler, and Philip-Lorca diCorcia. Philip-Lorca diCorcia Analogues of Reality. Yale University Press. 2012. p. 156. Referenced April 6, 2015.
