= Anna Clarén =

Swedish photographer and educator

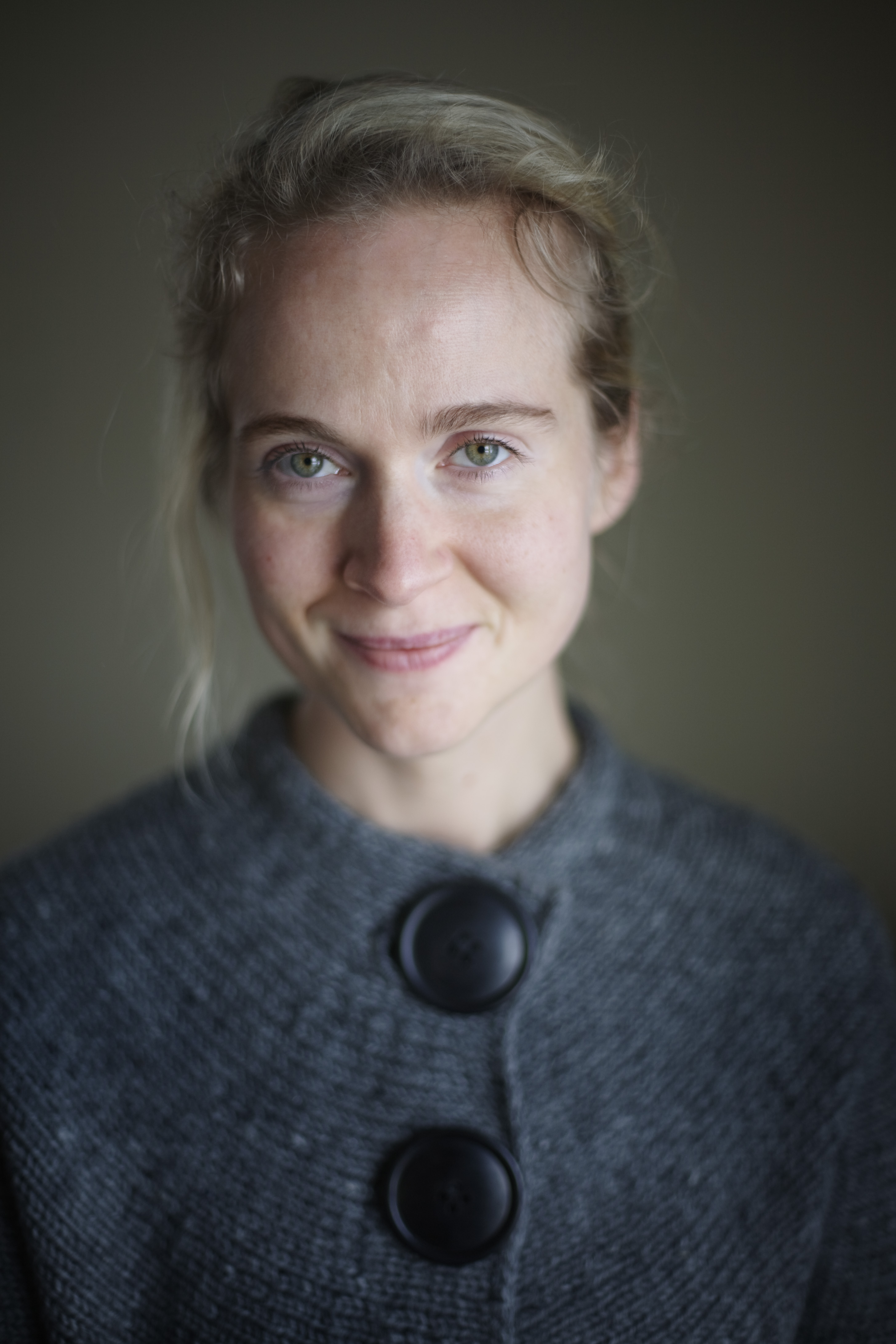
Clarén, 2009

Anna Clarén (born 1972) is a Swedish photographer and educator.

Holding (2006) won Best Photobook in the Swedish Photo Book Prize. She has had solo exhibitions at The House of Culture and Fotografiska in Stockholm, and at the Musée des Beaux-Arts de Caen in France. Clarén's work is held in the collection of Moderna Museet in Stockholm.

She leads the Nordens Folkhögskola Biskops-Arnö (Nordic Photography School).

== Early life and education ==
Clarén was born in 1972 in Valje, Sweden and grew up in Lund, Scania.

She studied photojournalism from 1994 to 1996 at Nordens Folkhögskola Biskops-Arnö, Sweden.

== Life and work ==
Clarén worked as a photographer from 1997, including as a press photographer for Aftonbladet and Icakuriren, and making work for magazines and books. She now leads the Nordens Folkhögskola Biskops-Arnö, where she has been a head teacher since 2006.

Holding (2006) is a visual diary created over four months that "portrays the people and places in Clarén's immediate surroundings". It is included in Parr and Badger's The Photobook: A History, Volume III, where it is described as containing "portraits, interiors, still lifes and landscapes — that together seem to make up a mysterious narrative. The style is diffuse and the images high key, washed-out in colour and frequently blue-tinged, which suggests they have only one foot in reality, and that the narrative is raking through old memories, or is a dream."

With Close to Home (2013) Clarén "documented herself as pregnant, her children, and the people and surroundings close to her home."

When Everything Changed (2018) was made from the point her third child was diagnosed with autism; "we then follow the family and glimpse the different ways they deal with the situation", from 2013 to 2017.

== Publications ==
- Holding. Sweden: Journal, 2006. ISBN 978-9197577045.
- Puppy Love. Sweden: Journal, 2009. ISBN 978-9197762564.
- Close to Home. Stockholm: Max Ström, 2013. ISBN 978-9171262677.
- När allt förändrades / When Everything Changed
  - När allt förändrades. Stockholm: Max Ström, 2018. ISBN 978-91-7126-441-1.
  - When Everything Changed. Stockholm: Max Ström, 2018. ISBN 9789171264428.

== Exhibitions ==
=== Solo exhibitions ===
- Holding, Musée des Beaux-Arts de Caen, Caen, France, 2008/9
- Holding, The House of Culture, Stockholm, Sweden, 2008
- When Everything Changed, Fotografiska, Stockholm, Sweden, 2018

=== Group exhibitions ===
- A Way of Life: Swedish Photography from Christer Strömholm until Today, Moderna Museet Malmö, Malmö, Sweden, 2014; Moderna Museet, Stockholm, Sweden, 2014/15. With work by Christer Strömholm, Clarén, Martin Bogren, JH Engström, Kenneth Gustavsson, Gerry Johansson, Tuija Lindström, Anders Petersen, Inta Ruka, Gunnar Smoliansky, Lars Tunbjörk, and others.

== Awards ==
- 2006: Holding won Best Photobook in the Swedish Photo Book Prize from the Swedish Association of Professional Photographers

== Collections ==
Clarén's work is held in the following public collection:

- Moderna Museet, Stockholm, Sweden: 12 prints (as of August 2021)
