= Martin Bogren =

Swedish photographer

- Born: 1967; Skurup, Skåne County, Sweden
- Occupation: Documentary photographer
- Known for: Black-and-white documentary photography; books such as Lowlands, Ocean, and Italia

Martin Bogren (born 1967) is a Swedish documentary photographer, living in Malmö. He has made "understated books full of quietly observed moments shot in grainy black and white."

Bogren has had solo exhibitions of Lowlands and Italia at Fotografiska in Stockholm, Sweden, and of Ocean at Blue Sky Gallery in Portland, Oregon. Lowlands has also been shown in group exhibitions at Moderna Museet Malmö and Moderna Museet, Stockholm. His work is held in the collections of Fotografiska and of Portland Art Museum.

== Life and work ==
Bogren grew up in Skurup, Skåne County (also known as Scania County), Sweden.

In the early 1990s he photographed bands and artists. He toured for several years with the Swedish pop group the Cardigans, making a "diaristic book", The Cardigans: Been it (1997). He has since established his signature style, making—in the words of Sean O'Hagan in The Guardian—"understated books full of quietly observed moments shot in grainy black and white." In Ocean (2008) "his subjects were a group of men from Rajasthan, who had travelled the 1,000-odd miles from their inland home by minibus to bathe in the sea for the first time." For Lowlands (2011), Bogren revisited his childhood home of Skurup over 4 years, "to portray the inhabitants, environments and atmosphere of the village", "a rural Swedish idyll peopled with strange and beautiful characters." For Tractor Boys (2013) "he immersed himself in the enclosed world of a group of adolescent boys from rural Sweden who customise and race old cars for fun." Italia (2016), made in Naples, Palermo, Bologna and Turin, is "Bogren's take on street photography". August Song (2020) was made during summers between 2013 and 2018, at music venues hidden in woods on the outskirts of villages in rural parts of Sweden. Passenger (2021) was made over several stays in Calcutta, India and for the first time mixes colour photographs with his usual black and white.

As of 2021 Bogren lives in Malmö, Sweden.

== Publications ==
=== Books of work by Bogren ===
- The Cardigans: Been it. Tiden, 1997. ISBN 978-9188876539. Photographs by Bogren, text by Martin Theander and Kristoffer Triumf.
- Ocean. Finn Larsen, 2008. ISBN 978-9197696685.
- Lowlands. Max Strom, 2011. ISBN 978-9171262301.
- Tractor Boys. Stockport: Dewi Lewis, 2013. ISBN 978-1-907893-35-3. With an essay by Christian Caujolle. (Note: Caujolle's essay is available here at the 1000 Words website)
- Italia. Max Ström, 2016. ISBN 978-9171263865. Includes a short prose pamphlet by Bogren.
- August Song. Bentivoglio, Italy: L'Artiere, 2020. ISBN 978-88-87569-85-8. Edition of 1000 copies.
- Passenger. Lamaindonne, 2021. ISBN 978-2-9560488-8-6.
- A Summer of a Thousand Years. L'axolotl, 2024. ISBN 978-2-9588393-1-4.

=== Artist books by Bogren ===
- Notes. Stockholm: Stockholms Fotoantikvariat, 2008. ISBN 978-91-975038-1-5.
- Embraces. Self-published, 2014. Edition of 150 copies.
- Hollow. Self-published, 2018. Edition of 15 copies.

== Exhibitions ==
=== Solo exhibitions ===
- Ocean, Blue Sky Gallery, Portland, Oregon, 2009
- Martin Bogren: Lowlands, Fotografiska, Stockholm, Sweden, 2011
- Martin Bogren: Italia, Fotografiska, Stockholm, Sweden, 2016/17

=== Group exhibitions ===
- A Way of Life: Swedish Photography from Christer Strömholm until Today, Moderna Museet Malmö, Malmö, Sweden, 2014; Moderna Museet, Stockholm, Sweden, 2014/15. With work by Christer Strömholm, Bogren, Anna Clarén, JH Engström, Kenneth Gustavsson, Gerry Johansson, Tuija Lindström, Anders Petersen, Inta Ruka, Gunnar Smoliansky, Lars Tunbjörk, and others.

== Collections ==
Bogren's work is held in the following collections:

- Fotografiska, Stockholm, Sweden
- Portland Art Museum, Portland, Oregon
