= Kenneth Gustavsson =

Kenneth Gustavsson or Gustafsson may refer to:

- Kenneth Gustafsson (footballer, born 1982), Swedish footballer for Gunnilse IS
- Kenneth Gustafsson (footballer, born 1983), Swedish footballer for GAIS
- Kenta (musician) (Kenneth Gustafsson, 1948–2003), Swedish musician
- Kenneth Gustavsson (photographer) (1946–2009), Swedish photographer
