= Michael Najjar =

German artist (born 1966)

Michael Najjar (born in 1966 in Landau) is a German artist, explorer and Future Astronaut. He lives and works in Berlin. His work spans photography, video, digital image-making, and sculpture. He works closely at the intersection of art, science, and technology, and takes a critical look at the technological developments that are defining and drastically transforming the early 21st century.

== Life and education ==
In 1993, Najjar graduated from the Berlin Bildo Academy of New Media Arts, an institution that placed a strong emphasis on photography, video, and computer technology as forms of artistic expression. Its philosophical framework drew from thinkers such as: Vilém Flusser, Paul Virilio and Jean Baudrillard. Najjar has lived and worked in Brazil, Cuba, Spain, England, Japan and the United States reflecting the international orientation of his practice. Najjar was a Hasselblad Ambassador from 2012 – 2017 and was nominated for the Prix Pictet in 2018, 2019 and 2025. In 2019, he was shortlisted for the Sony World Award and invited as a guest artist of the CERN physics laboratory. He held the ACAF residency (Australian Chinese Art Foundation) in 2024. He is a member of DFA (German Academy of Photography).

Najjar was also one of Virgin Galactic's first astronauts and is expected to fly into space aboard the VSS Unity.

== Work (selection) ==
Michael Najjar's photographic and video works draw on an interdisciplinary understanding of art, fusing art, science, and technology into visions of future social structures shaped by the impact of cutting-edge technologies.

Najjar's work is organized in thematic series and his interdisciplinary practice frequently involves collaborations with scientists, researchers, and engineers. Themes explored across these series range from transformation of global megacities through compaction of information networks ("netropolis" 2003-2006 / 2016 ongoing), to depictions of the human body transformed by biogenetic intervention ("bionic angel" 2006-2008) the virtualization of financial markets through algorithmic trading ("high altitude" 2008-2010) and the future of the human species through space exploration ("outer space" since 2011). Since 2021, Michael Najjar has been working on a new series entitled "cool earth", which explores the future of the planet in the context of climate change focusing on the Anthropocene, climate engineering and the relationship between humans and nature.

The performative aspect has become a fundamental part of Najjar's working process. A defining feature of his practice is the way it is informed by direct hands-on experience; the artist described the experience as "living through" the situations that provide the leitmotifs of his art as central to his work. For decades, Najjar has undertaken journeys and expeditions around the world, with many of his projects stemming from fieldwork in remote and often difficult to access locations. He has climbed seven-thousand-metre peaks, scaled skyscrapers, trekked active volcanoes, crossed glaciers, descended into ice caves, traversed deserts, and undergone intensive astronaut training. To create his images, Najjar exposes his body to extreme conditions, testing his mental and physical limits within challenging natural or technological environments.

=== cool earth ===
Michael Najjar's latest work series "cool earth" (2021 ongoing) deals with our planetary future in times of climate change as well as with the role of new climate technologies. It addresses the far-reaching ecological, economic and cultural impact of human-induced climate change, which leads to a fundamental redefinition of the relationship between humans and nature. In the new epoch of the Anthropocene, humans have become the major transformative force in the Earth system, which is increasingly reaching its limits. Humans are now altering nature for hundreds of thousands of years into the future; the natural environment is being transformed into post-natural landscapes, the technosphere envelops our planet and is expanding increasingly into outer space. The synthesis of the technical and the natural will be decisive for the future of our planet.

In view of the dramatic consequences of climate change for future generations, technical, aesthetic, and cultural new perspectives are needed. Topics such as geoengineering, weather manipulation, terraforming, satellite-based Earth observation, biophilic architecture, new energy sources and transport systems, as well as urban future designs, are at the center of the "cool earth" series. It raises the question of if and to what extent technologies can help us shape the planetary future — and what price we will have to pay for it. Scientists are increasingly discussing the possibilities of large-scale technical interventions in the natural Earth systems, known as climate engineering: targeted technical interventions in the Earth’s geo- and biochemical cycles, the oceans, soils, and atmosphere.

=== outer space ===
Michael Najjar's work series "outer space" looks at the latest developments in space research and their far-reaching impact on life on Earth, in near-Earth orbit, on the Moon, and other celestial bodies. In recent years, technological innovation has led to a dynamic expansion of human activity in outer space. This evolution brings civilizational, ethical, and geopolitical questions into focus, demanding a new discourse on humanity’s expansion beyond our home planet.

The cultural dimension represented by emerging space technologies is central to Najjars's work, exploring the knowledge such technologies may offer about the universe, their impact on space travel, and their potential influence on the way humans live and work on Earth.

All of the works are digital collages based on Najjar's photographs. They not only document but also interweave documentary and fictional scenarios to create visionary depictions of current and future space exploration.

The ongoing series started in 2011 with the final launch of the American Space Shuttle Atlantis and currently includes 73 photographic artworks and 6 videos. The artist has visited the most important space centers, like the Kennedy Space Center and Starbase in the US, Star City in Russia, the Baikonour Cosmodrome in Kazakhstan, the Guiana Space Centre in French Guiana, and the German Aerospace Center. In close dialogue with scientists, engineers, and astronauts, he gained access to global research facilities developing next-generation spacecraft, rockets, satellites, and telescopes.

In Chile's Atacama Desert, he photographed some of the world’s most powerful telescopes, perched on remote Andean plateaus. In China, he documented the world’s largest radio telescope, hidden deep in the forest. In Iceland, he explored the concept of terraforming through his lens. At Starbase in Texas, he captured the first test flight of the revolutionary Starship; in the White Sands desert, he photographed Virgin Galactic’s spaceplane. At NASA, he portrayed the legendary James Webb Space Telescope during its early development, and at the Human Robotics Center in Edinburgh, he focused on future humanoid Mars robots. On Svalbard in the High Arctic, he visited the world’s northernmost satellite station; in New Zealand, he descended into the crater of an active volcano; in Switzerland, he gained access to the world’s largest particle accelerator at CERN. He is currently documenting the mission of the latest exoplanet finder in Germany and the Netherlands.

Michael Najjar, one of the early participants in Virgin Galactic’s astronaut program, is scheduled to take part in a future spaceflight aboard VSS Unity. If the flight proceeds as planned, he is expected to become one of the first artists to travel into space.

In preparation for this flight, Najjar underwent an intensive astronaut training program at Star City (GCTC), Russia, at the German Aerospace Center (DLR) and the National AeroSpace Training And Research Center (NASTAR) in the US. Pushing both mental and physical limits, he subjected himself to a demanding series of training modules: a stratospheric flight in a MiG-29 jet fighter, zero gravity flights, high-G centrifuge tests, underwater training in a space suit, and a HALO parachute jump from 10,000 meters. The photographic and video material collected during these extreme experiences often forms the basis of his later image compositions.

Najjar's "outer space" series also includes a compilation of contemporary visions of future life and work in space. These visions, inherent in the actual artworks, were commissioned by the artist and formulated in a series of 'vision statements' written by leading figures in space exploration, science, architecture and philosophy, including Buzz Aldrin, Richard Branson, Tim Smit, Michael Lopez-Alegria, Anousheh Ansari, Norman Foster, and Stephen Hawking.

Works from the "outer space" series have been exhibited internationally in numerous museums, biennials and galleries. In 2017, the series was nominated for the prestigious Prix Pictet. Two comprehensive publications on the series were published by the publisher DISTANZ Verlag, Berlin, in 2014 and 2021. In addition, Michael Najjar published "Planetary Echoes" with Spector Books – a collection of essays on the future colonization of our solar system. The work has been widely covered in numerous articles. The “outer space” series is ongoing and expands by three to four new works each year.

=== netropolis ===
The series "netropolis" moves the aesthetic exploration of the megacity into the 21st century. Najjar traveled around the globe and climbed – often evading the security guards – the highest towers of twelve megacities. At first glance, these large-format black-and-white photographs show a panoramic view of the city, combining all four cardinal directions in a single image. The high angle and bird's-eye view transform the vastness of the city into an abstract landscape, while the reduction of the high horizon to a narrow strip tilts the image into a horizontal plane. At the same time, however, the picture forces viewer’s to continually switch perspectives between near and far, between micro and macrostructures, since the vibrant nature of the city is grounded in the correlation between closeness and distance.

The result is an interwoven texture that exhibits expansions, compressions and reconstructions of time and space, which Najjar conceptualises as allegories of the abstract infinite data horizon of our megacities.

In these works, Najjar is not primarily concerned with the spatial perception of specific topographies, but rather with urban living and activity spaces and their overlap with technical and virtual fluid space. Thus, the electronic topography of our megacities also implies the disappearance of space and time, as acceleration – this dominant dimension of our world – increasingly reduces urban structures and their entire social fabric to data noise.

Michael Najjar worked on "netropolis“ between 2003 and 2006, and returned to the series in 2016. The series currently portrays the megacities of New York, Los Angeles, Mexico City, São Paulo, Tokyo, Shanghai, Beijing, Hong Kong, Singapore, Seoul, Paris, Dubai, London, and Berlin. More cities will follow.

=== high altitude ===
For "high altitude" (2008–2010), Michael Najjar climbed Mount Aconcagua, at 6,962 meters (22,841 feet) the highest mountain outside of Asia. In the Andes, Najjar photographed mountain ridges whose zigzag lines served as a symbol of the monumentality of financial markets. The photographs he took on the expedition were strictly based on the fluctuations of international stock market indices. The images show the highs and lows of the markets and how market reality and simulation are so intertwined that they are almost indistinguishable. The movements of the tectonic plates of the global economy over the last twenty to thirty years become visible, during which new peaks emerge and earthquakes and erosion are inevitable. Najjar shows the sublime at a time when information technology has become all-powerful.

=== Projects Studio Michael Najjar ===
In October 2015, Studio Michael Najjar unveiled the world's first futuristic "Space Suite" at the Kameha Grand Zurich, Switzerland. In 2016, the "Space Suite" by Studio Michael Najjar was a finalist for the European Hotel Design Award for the best new Hotel Suite in Europe.

In cooperation with the Michael Stich Foundation, Michael Najjar designed an entire floor for the UKE – Clinic for Pediatric Medicine in Hamburg. The creative concept is based on his "outer space" series.

== Selected exhibitions ==
Since the beginning his career in the mid-1990s, Michael Najjar's work has been shown in numerous international gallery and museum exhibitions, as well as biennials. In 2004, Harald Szeemann presented his work in "The Beauty of Failure / The Failure of Beauty" at the Joan Miró Foundation in Barcelona. In 2006, he was invited to the 10th Venice Architecture Biennale and also exhibited at the 9th Havana Biennial. In 2008, the GEM Museum of Contemporary Art in The Hague hosted the first comprehensive retrospective of his work.

In 2011, Najjar participated in the ground-breaking exhibition "Atlas – How to carry the world on one's back", which was shown at the Museo Reina Sofía in Madrid, the ZKM Center for Art and Media in Karlsruhe, and the Deichtorhallen/Phönixhallen in Hamburg. In 2015, Peter Weibel featured Najjar's series "outer space" in the revolutionary exhibition "Exo-Evolution" at ZKM Karlsruhe. In 2017, he was invited by Yuko Hasegawa to participate in the 7th International Moscow Biennale.

Since 2018 Najjar's work has been part of the travelling exhibition "Civilization – The Way We Live Now", which has been shown at major institutions such as the Ullens Center for Contemporary Art, Beijing, the National Museum of Modern and Contemporary Art, Seoul, the National Gallery of Victoria, Melbourne, the Saatchi Gallery, London, Kunsthalle Munich and Museum für Gestaltung, Zurich, among others.

In 2021, he took part in the show "Oil – Beauty and Horror in the Petrol Age" at Kunstmuseum Wolfsburg and in 2023, he opened Ars Electronica with a large-scale 8K projection of his recent series "cool earth". The same year, he exhibited in "Mars: The Red Mirror" at the ArtScience Museum Singapore. In 2024, works from his "outer space" series were part of "SPACE. A Visual Journey" at Fotografiska Stockholm and, in 2025, at Fotografiska Tallinn and Fotografiska Shanghai.

Fotografiska Shanghai and Shenzhen show Najjar's solo exhibition "Morphing Equilibrium" in 2026.

Beyond these major exhibitions, Najjar's work has been exhibited in museums including: Akademie der Künste, Berlin; Alfred Ehrhardt Foundation, Berlin; Museum Ludwig, Cologne; Hamburger Kunsthalle / Galerie der Gegenwart, Hamburg; Deichtorhallen, Hamburg; Marta Museum, Herford; Edith Russ Haus für Medienkunst, Oldenburg; Kunstmuseum Wolfsburg; Saatchi Gallery, London; Science Museum, London; Museum of Contemporary Art, Birmingham; Centre pour l'image contemporaine, Geneva; Ars Electronica Center, Linz; Centro de Arte Contemporaneo, Málaga; Museo Es Baluard, Palma de Mallorca; Museo DA2 (Domus Artium 2002), Salamanca; Museum of Contemporary Art, Belgrade; Tampere Art Museum, Tampere; New Media Art Institute, Amsterdam; FORMA International Centre for Photography, Milan; Museum of Art, Tucson; Auckland Art Gallery Toi o Tamaki, Auckland; National Gallery of Victoria, Melbourne; National Museum of Science, Taipei; Central Academy of Fine Arts, Beijing; Ullens Center for Contemporary Art, Beijing; ZheJiang Art Museum, Hangzhou; National Museum of Modern and Contemporary Art, Seoul; ArtScience Museum, Singapore.

Najjar's works are held in museum, corporate, and private collections worldwide. Museum collections include: ZKM Center for Art and Media Karlsruhe; Museum Ludwig, Cologne; Deichtorhallen Hamburg; Gemeente Museum, The Hague; Centro de Arte Contemporáneo de Málaga, Málaga; Museo Es Baluard, Palma de Mallorca; Museo de Bellas Artes, Santander; Museo DA2 Domus Artium 2000, Salamanca; Muzeum Susch, Switzerland; National Air and Space Museum, Smithsonian Institution, Washington D.C.; Centre national de l'audiovisuel (CNA), Luxembourg; and Australian China Art Foundation, Melbourne.

== Work series ==
- cool earth, 2021 – ongoing
- outer space, 2011 – ongoing
- f1, 2011
- high altitude, 2008–2010
- bionic angel, 2006–2008
- netropolis, 2003–2006 and 2016 – ongoing
- no memory access, 2001–2005
- information and apocalypse, 2003
- end of sex.as we know it., 2002
- schnittbilder, 2001
- nexus project part I, 1999–2000
- Japanese style, 1999–2000
- ¡viva fidel! – journey into absurdity, 1997

== Books and catalogues ==
Horx, Matthias (ed.): "beyond. Das Jahrbuch für Zukunft 2026", The Future Project Frankfurt, Germany / Vienna, Austria, 2025

Giegler, Wolfgang (ed.): "EIKON #130-131", Austrian Institute for Photography and Media Art – EIKON, Vienna, Austria, 2025

Klap, Roosje & Wevers, Rosa (eds.): "Noorderlicht. Machine Entanglements“, 30th Nooderlicht International Photo Biennale, exh.cat. Groningen, The Netherlands, 2025

Davidson, Cynthia & Templeton, Patrick (eds.): "LOG #63. Observations on Architecture and the Contemporary City", Anyone Corporation, New York USA, 2025 (Postcard insert)

Diederen, Roger & Ewing, William A. & Kirchberger, Stefan & Stöhr, Franziska (eds.): "CIVILIZATION. Wie Wir Heute Leben. Das Magazin zur Ausstellung", Munich, Germany, 2025

ArtScience Museum (ed.): "Mars: The Red Mirror", exh. cat. Singapore, 2024

PHOTO 2024 (ed.): "The Future Is Shaped by Those Who Can See It. PHOTO 2024", exh. cat. Melbourne, Australia, 2024

Fundació "la Caixa" (ed.): "Horizonte y Limite. Visiones del Paisaje", exh. cat. Madrid, Spain, 2023

Najjar, Michael, Galería Juan Silió (eds.): "Michael Najjar – cool earth", exh. cat. Madrid, Spain, 2023

Beitin, Andreas, Klose, Alexander, Steininger, Benjamin (eds.): "Oil. Schönheit und Schrecken des Erdölzeitalters", Verlag der Buchhandlung Walther und Franz König, exh. cat. Cologne, Germany, 2021

Najjar, Michael: "outer space – v2", Distanz Verlag, Berlin, Germany, 2021

Beatrice, Luca (ed.): "FUTURO – Arte e società dagli anni Sessanta a domani, Gallerie d'Italia – Palazzo Leoni Montanari", exh.cat. Vincenza, Italy, 2020

Vanhanen, Hannu (eds.): "Space Works – Our Relationship With the Cosmos", exh. cat.Tampere Art Museum, Tampere, USA, 2020

Feireiss, Lukas (ed.): "Space is ... the Place", Leipzig, Germany, 2020

Bollmann, Philipp (ed.): "Mit geliehenen Augen", Bielefeld, Germany, 2020

Innovationsfabrik Wittenstein (ed.): "Beyond the Horizon", exh.cat. Innovationsfabrik Wittenstein, Igersheim, Germany, 2019

Brenner, Neil (ed.), "New urban Spaces", New York, USA, 2019

Ewing, William A. & Roussel, Holly (eds.), "Civilization – The Way We Live Now", exh. cat. London, UK, 2018

Bollmann, Philipp (Hg./ed.), "Sichtspiele – Filme und Videokunst aus der Sammlung Wemhöner", Berlin, Germany, 2018

Feireiss, Lukas & Najjar Michael (eds.), "Planetary Echoes. Exploring the implications of human settlement in space", Leipzig, Germany, 2017

Najjar, Michael: "outer space", Distanz Verlag, Berlin, Germany, 2014

Bollmann, Philipp (ed.): "In-Sight – Photographs from the Wemhöner Collection", Kerber Verlag, Bielefeld, Germany, 2012

Najjar, Michael: "high altitude" Kerber Verlag, Bielefeld, Germany, 2011

Bollmann, Philipp (ed.): "Focus Asia – Einblicke in die Sammlung Wemhöner" Kerber Verlag, Bielefeld, Germany, 2011

Kolczynska, Paulina "Identity, or on a variety of perspectives" in: "Identity – Photographs of the Grazyna Kulczyk Collection" exh. cat., Poznan, Poland, 2011

Museum für Kunst und Gewerbe (ed.): "Portraits in series – a century of photographs" exh. cat., Kerber Verlag, Bielefeld, Germany, 2011

Herschdorfer, Nathalie (ed.): "High altitude – Photography in the mountains" exh. cat., 5 continents editions, Milan, Italy, 2011

Melis, Wim (ed.): "metropolis" Stichting Aurora Borealis, Photo Festival, Groningen, Netherlands, 2011

Klanten, Robert / Ehmann, Sven / Schulze, Floyd (eds.): "Visual storytelling: inspiring a new visual language" Die Gestalten Verlag, Berlin, Germany, 2011

Damian, Angela / Azoulay, Elizabeth / Frioux, Dalibor (eds.): "100.000 years of beauty" Editions Babylone, Paris, France, 2010

Klanten, Robert / Ehmann, Sven / Bourquin, Nicolas (eds.): "data flow 2" Die Gestalten Verlag, Berlin, Germany, 2010

Klanten, Robert / Feireiss, Lukas (eds.): "Beyond architecture. Imaginative buildings and fictional cities" Die Gestalten Verlag, Berlin, Germany, 2009

Kerner, Charlotte (ed.): "The next GENeration. Science Fiction" Belz & Gelberg, Weinheim, Germany, 2009

Sasse, Julie (ed.): "Trouble in paradise: examining the discord between nature and society" exh. cat., Tucson Museum of Art, Tucson, USA, 2009

van Sinderen, Wim (ed.): "Augmented realities – Michael Najjar works 1997-2008" ex. cat., GEM – The Hague Museum of Photography Veenman Publishers, Rotterdam, Netherlands, 2008

Miha, Andy (ed.): "Human futures: art in an age of uncertainty" Fact & Liverpool University Press, Liverpool, UK, 2008

Bitforms Gallery / Galería Juan Silió / Najjar, Michael (Ed.): "bionic angel" Berlin, Germany, 2008

Scarpato, Rosario / Piccioni, Monica (eds.): "Map games: dynamics of change" exh. cat., Central Academy of Fine Arts, Beijing, China, 2008

Es Baluard, Museu d'Art Modern i Contemporani de Palma (ed.): "en privat1" exh. cat., Museo Es Baluard, Palma, Spain, 2008

Explorafoto y Fundación Salamanca Ciudad de Cultura (ed.): "Michael Najjar – information and apocalypse" exh. cat., DA2, Domus Artium 2002, Salamanca, Spain, 2007

Ewing, William (ed.): "Face – the new photographic portrait" Thames & Hudson, London, UK, 2006

Herrera, Nelson (ed.): "9th Havana Biennal 2006" ex. cat., Centro de Arte Contemporáneo Wifredo Lam Havana, Cuba, 2006

Sanz, Antonio (ed.): "C on cities" exh. cat., 10. Mostra Internazionale di Architettura La Biennale di Venezia, Italy, 2006

Panera, Javier (ed.): "Mascaradas politicas" Explorafoto – Festival Internacional de Fotografía de Castilla y León. exh. cat., DA2, Domus Artium 2002, Salamanca, Spain, 2006

Himmelsbach, Sabine (ed.): "Sichtbarkeiten" ex. cat., Edith-Ruß-Site for Media Art, Oldenburg, Germany, 2006

Bitforms / Juan Silió / Guy Bärtschi / Najjar, Michael (eds.): "netropolis" Berlin, Germany, 2006

Najjar, Michael: "japanese style" exh. cat., Federal Foreign Office, Berlin, Germany, 2005

Mellis, Wim (ed.): "traces and omens" Stichting Aurora Borealis, Photo Festival, Groningen, Netherlands, 2005

Szeemann, Harald (ed.): "The beauty of failure / the failure of beauty" exh. cat., Fundació Joan Miró, Barcelona, Spain, 2004

Kemp, Sandra (ed.): "Future face – image, identity, innovation" Profile books Ltd. exh. cat., Science Museum London, London, UK, 2004

Felix, Zdenek (ed.): "A clear vision. Photographische Werke aus der Sammlung F.C. Gundlach" Hatje Cantz Verlag, exh. cat., International House of Photography Deichtorhallen, Hamburg, Germany, 2003

Goethe-Institut New York, Najjar, Michael (eds.): "Information and Apocalypse" exh. cat., Goethe-Institut New York Berlin, Germany, 2003

Triennale der Photographie Hamburg (ed.): "Reality-Check" ex. cat., 2. Triennale der Photographie, Hamburg, Germany, 2002
