= Tjälknöl =

Swedish dish

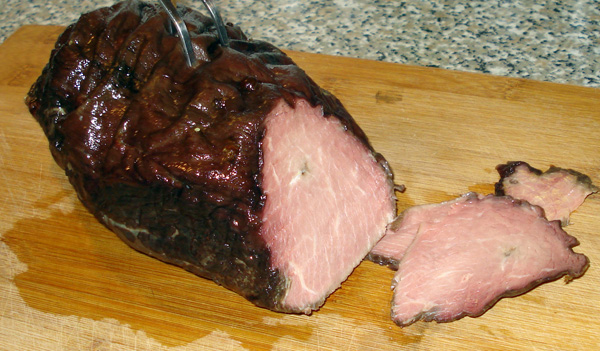
- Alternative names: Tjælaknul, tjälknul
- Type: Steak
- Course: Main dish
- Place of origin: Sweden
- Region or state: Medelpad; Northern Sweden
- Created by: Ragnhild Nilsson
- Invented: 1970's
- Cooking time: 15 hours to 17 hours
- Serving temperature: Cold
- Main ingredients: Moose steak
- Ingredients generally used: Garlic; Cranberries; Bay leafs; Lingon berries
- Similar dishes: Roast beef

Tjälknöl, tjälknul (in Jämtland tjælaknul) or tjaele lump is a dish originating from Norrland, Sweden. It is made from a frozen moose steak, or other meat, that is roasted at a low temperature.

== Preparation ==
The tjälknöl is cooked in the oven from a solid-frozen state at only 75–100 °C for 12 hours until the core temperature reaches 68 °C. After cooking, the meat is allowed to rest in the fridge for 5 hours submerged in brine inside a covered, tight container, for example a freeze bag, together with other spices such as garlic, cranberries, bay leafs, and lingon berries. The meat needs to be turned a couple of times so that it is evenly soaked. The tjälknöl is served cold in thin slices, with, for example, a potato gratiné, or on the Christmas table. The dish has some similarities to roast beef, but is cooked at a lower temperature and for a longer time, which makes the meat very tender.

== Etymology ==
The name is a compound of the words "tjäle" and "knul". 'Tjaele' meaning ground frost, or when something is frozen solid, in this case the steak. The word "knul" is a Norrland dialect word meaning "lump", with "knöl" being the standard Swedish equivalent.

== History ==
The dish was created by Ragnhild Nilsson (1926–2006) from Hundberget outside Torpshammar, Sweden in the 1970s. Ragnhild was married to a moose-hunter and had asked her husband to thaw a moose steak while she was at work. Her husband initially forgot about it, but then panicked and put the solid-frozen steak in the oven to thaw at a very low temperature. He then left the house and forgot about the oven. The next day when Ragnhild came home from work she immediately understood what had happened and how long the steak had been left in the oven. She initially contemplated to use it as dog food, but as it was such fine meat she instead tried to save the tasteless steak by soaking it in brine for a couple of hours. Later when the couple tried the steak they found it both tender and good.

Ragnhild improved the recipe over the years, until 1982 when her husband surreptitiously admitted it to a competition held by ICA-kuriren where they looked for new provincial dishes. Ragnhild's tjälknöl won the competition as Medelpad's new provincial dish.

== External sources ==
- The recipe on Swedish Wikibooks
- Ragnhild's original recipe (in Swedish)
