= Anders Petersen (photographer) =

Swedish photographer (born 1944)

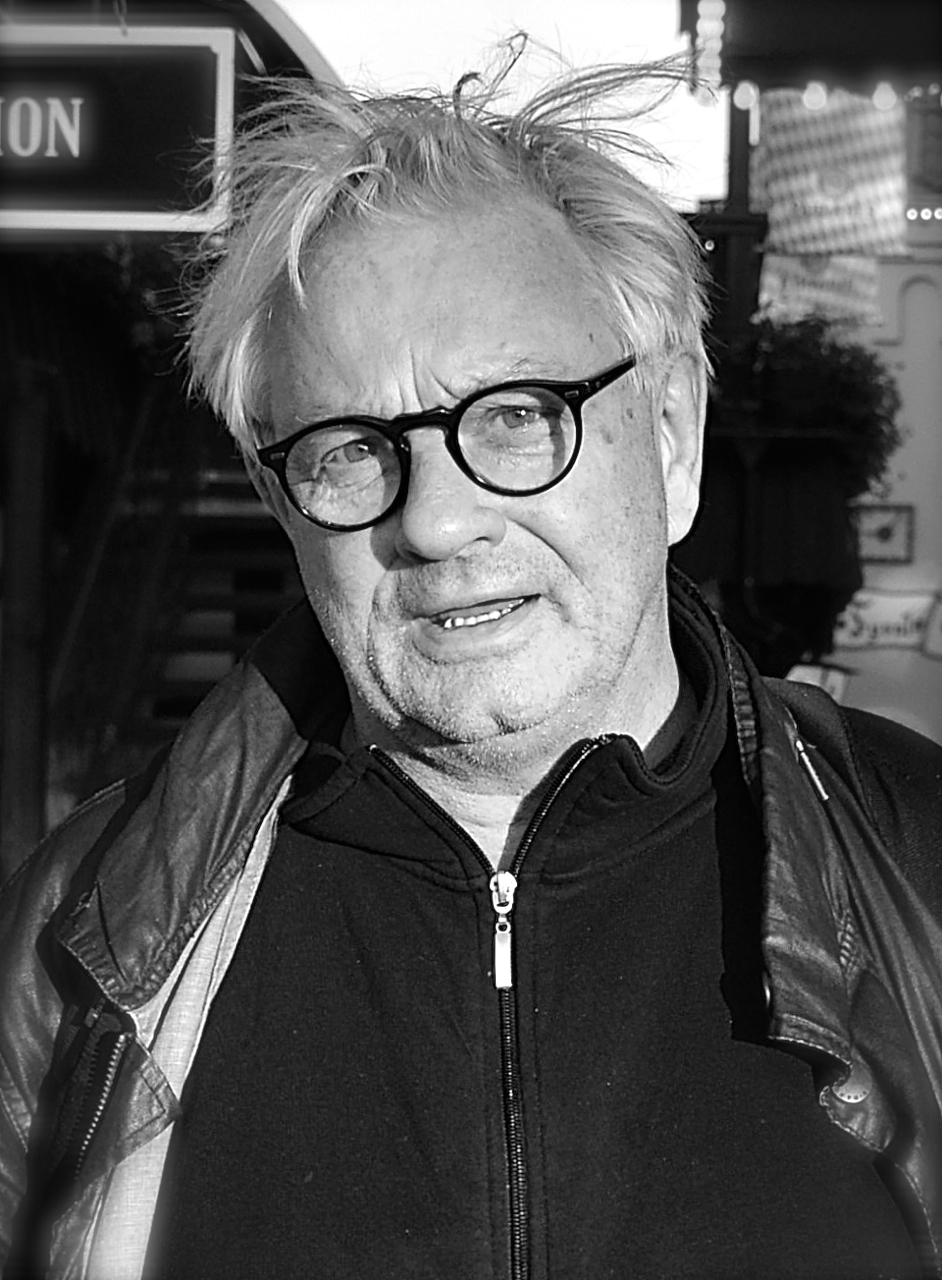
- Petersen in 2014
- Born: 1944 (age 81–82)
- Occupation: Photographer

Anders Petersen (born 1944) is a Swedish photographer, based in Stockholm. He makes intimate and personal documentary-style black and white photographs. Petersen has published more than 20 books. He has had exhibitions at Bibliothèque nationale de France, Liljevalchs konsthall, MARTa Herford, and Museum of Contemporary Art of Rome. His work is held in the collections of the Museum of Modern Art in New York and Moderna Museet in Stockholm.

== Biography ==
Petersen studied photography under Christer Strömholm in Sweden from 1966 to 1967. He is noted for his intimate and personal documentary-style black-and-white photographs.

For three years beginning in 1967 he photographed the late-night regulars (prostitutes, transvestites, drunks, lovers and drug addicts) in Café Lehmitz, a bar in Hamburg, Germany. The resulting photobook was first published in 1978 by Schirmer/Mosel in Germany. Café Lehmitz has since become regarded as a seminal book in the history of European photography. One of the photographs from this series was used as the cover art for Tom Waits' album Rain Dogs.

Petersen's first book Gröna Lund (Green Grove), which was published in 1973, is set in the amusement park of Gröna Lund situated on an island in Stockholm, Sweden.

In 1970 Petersen co-founded SAFTRA, the Stockholm group of photographers, with Kenneth Gustavsson. At the same time, he taught at Christer Strömholm's school. He has been director of the Göteborg School of Photography and Film. He began to photograph for magazines, and continued his personal photo diary work, which continues to this day. He has photographed for extensive periods of time in prisons, mental asylums, and elderly care homes.

== Publications ==
- Gröna Lund = Green Grove.
  - Stockholm: Fyra Förläggare, 1973. Text by Arnaud Cottebrune.
  - Villejuif, France: Aman Iman, 2009. ISBN 978-2-9533910-2-2. Edition of 300 copies.
  - Villejuif, France: Aman Iman, 2013. ISBN 979-10-92727-02-9.
  - Pyramyd Editions, 2013. French-language version.
- Café Lehmitz.
  - Munich: Schirmer/Mosel, 1978.
  - French edition, 1979.
  - Stockholm: ETC Förlags, 1982. ISBN 91-86168 04 5. Text by Roger Andersson.
  - Germany: Fischer Taschenbuch, 1985. ISBN 9783596230778. Paperback.
- Fängelse = Prison. ETC; Stockholm: Norstedts Förlag, 1984. ISBN 978-9118441325. Text by Leif G. W. Persson.
- Rågång till Kärleken = On the line of love. Stockholm: Norstedts Förlag, 1991. ISBN 91-1-913062-7. Text by Göran Odbratt.
- Karnevalen i Venedig ETC Förlag, 1991.
- Ingen har sett allt = Nobody has seen it all. 1995.
- Du Mich Auch = Same to you. Stockholm: Journal, 2002. ISBN 91-973629-2-1
- Close/Distance. 2002.
- Anders Petersen. Photo Poche No. 98. Arles, France: Actes Sud, 2004. ISBN 2-7427-4964-0.
  - Anders Petersen. Photofile. London: Thames & Hudson, 2013. ISBN 9780500411087.
- Roma, a diary. 2005.
- Sète # 08. France: Images En Manœuvres Editions - CétàVOIR, 2008. ISBN 978-2-8499-5118-7/
- French kiss Stockport, Cheshire: Dewi Lewis Publishing, 2008.
- Dear Diary. 2009.
- From Back Home. Stockholm: Max Ström, 2009. ISBN 978-9171261649. With JH Engström. Edited by Greger Ulf Nilson.
- City Diary. Göttingen, Germany: Steidl, 2009. In three volumes. ISBN 978-3-86521-536-9.
- Strange Evidence. Self-published / Createspace, 2012. ISBN 978-1456563738. Contains the images from the exhibition Mark Cohen: Strange Evidence curated by Peter Barbiere at the Philadelphia Museum of Art 2010/2011.
- Rome, a diary 2012. Rome: Punctum, 2012. Edition of 40 copies.
- Soho. London: Mack and The Photographers' Gallery, 2012. ISBN 978-1-907946-22-6.
- Veins. With Jacob Aue Sobol. Stockport, Cheshire: Dewi Lewis, 2013. ISBN 978-1-907893-45-2.
- Rome Collected photographs from three trips to Rome in 1984, 2005 and 2012. Curated by Marco Delogu in collaboration with Flavio Scollo.
  - Rome. Paperback. Köln: Walther König; Rome: Punctum, 2014. ISBN 978-3863354619.
  - Rome. Hardback. Köln: Walther König; Rome: Punctum, 2014. Edition of 150 copies with signed print.

== Exhibitions ==
- From Back Home, with JH Engström, National Science and Media Museum, Bradford, UK, October 2010 – March 2011
- Anders Petersen: Rome, a diary 2012, Museum of Contemporary Art of Rome, Rome, September–October 2012
- Anders Petersen, photographies, Bibliothèque nationale de France, Paris, November 2013 – February 2014
- Anders Petersen: Retrospective, MARTa Herford, Herford, Germany, December 2016 – March 2017
- Anders Petersen – Stockholm, Liljevalchs konsthall, Stockholm, Sweden, May–September 2019
- The Left Shore, with Johan Renck, Nationalmuseum, Stockholm, Sweden, 12 June 2025 – 11 January 2026

== Awards ==
- 2003: Photographer of the Year, Rencontres d'Arles, Arles, France
- 2007: Shortlisted, Deutsche Börse Photography Prize along with Philippe Chancel and Fiona Tan
- 2008: Dr. Erich Salomon Prize, German Society for Photography, Germany
- 2009: Contemporary Book Award, Rencontres d'Arles, Arles, France with JH Engström for From Back Home
- 2009: From Back Home was nominated for The Best Photographic Book in Sweden, year 2009
- 2012: Winner, PhotoBook of the Year, Paris Photo–Aperture Foundation PhotoBook Awards for City Diary (Volumes 1–3)

== Collections ==
Petersen's work is held in the following permanent collections:

- Moderna Museet, Stockholm, Sweden
- Museum of Modern Art, New York: 2 prints (as of 8 October 2023)
