= Björn Dawidsson =

Swedish photographer (born 1949)

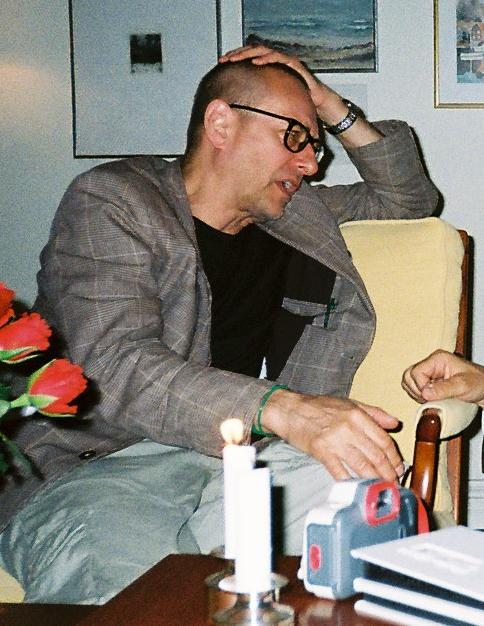
Dawidsson in Stockholm in 2008

Björn Dawidsson (born June 7 1949 in Örebro), who publishes as Dawid, is a Swedish photographer based in Stockholm.

== Biography ==
In 1973 he Dawidsson had his first big solo exhibition Ingen älskar mig (Nobody Loves Me) at Liljevalchs konsthall in Stockholm with a selection of 50 small camera prints from 35mm negatives.

The Rost series marked a fundamental shift away from both the style of his previous images and the parameters of 'straight' representational photography.

Dawidsson has been exhibited in many national and international museums and galleries and is represented in a number of significant art collections.

== Solo exhibitions (selection) ==
- Swedish Photography, Berlin, Germany), 2013
- Landskrona Museum, (Landskrona, Sweden), 2012
- Swedish Photography, Berlin, Germany), 2011
- Fotografiska, (Stockholm, Sweden), 2010 and 2011
- Nordic Light, (Kristiansund, Norway), 2010
- Hasselblad Center, (Gothenburg, Sweden), 2009
- Skövde Museum, (Skövde, Sweden), 2008
- Liljevalchs Konsthall, (Stockholm, Sweden), 2008
- Millesgårdens Konsthall, Stockholm, Sweden), 2005
- Centre Culturel Suédois, (Paris, France), 2002
- The Pentagram Gallery, (London, UK), 2001
- Galerie Priska Pasquer, (Cologne, Germany), 2001
- Galerie 213, Retrospective of large format works, (Paris, France) 1999
- Karlshamns Konsthall, Retrospective, (Karlshamn, Sweden), 1997
- Galleri Krister Fahl, (Stockholm, Sweden). 1994 (
- Folkwang Museum (Essen, Germany), M + M, large format works, 1993
- Malmö Konsthall (Malmö, Sweden) (DAGRAMS), photograms, 1989
- Centre Culturel Suédois, (Paris, France), 1986
- Upplandsmuseet, (Uppsala, Sweden), 1985
- Moderna Museet, “Rost” (Stockholm, Sweden) 1983
- Galleri Camera Obscura, (Stockholm, Sweden), 1980
- Liljevalchs Konsthall, “Ingen älskar mig”(Stockholm, Sweden) 1973

== Books/Monographs (selection) ==
- Kars, 2011
- Hybris, Liljevalchs Konsthall (text Niclas Östlind), 2008
- Beautiful Frames, Steidl (Editor Michael Mack), 2001
- Mot fotografiet/Arbetsnamn Skulptur (Working Title: Sculpture), by Linde, Ulf, Carlsson Bokförlag, 1989
- Verkligen?!, by Dawid and Lind, Håkan, Bokförlaget, 1978, (reissued 2009, (text Niclas Östlind)

== Collections ==
- Absolut Art Collection
- Bonnier Collection, Stockholm, Sweden
- Camera Obscura Collection, Stockholm, Sweden
- Centro Cultural Arte Contemporaneo, Mexico City, Mexico
- Dorint Collection, Brussels, Belgium
- Erling Neby Collection, Norway
- Folkwang Museum, Essen
- Göteborgs Konstmuseum, Gothenburg, Sweden
- Helsingborg Konstmuseum, Sweden
- Kalmar Konstmuseum, Kalmar, Sweden
- Landskrona Museum, Landskrona, Sweden
- Malmö Museum, Malmö, Sweden
- Manfred Heiting Collection, Amsterdam, Netherlands
- Moderna Museet, Stockholm, Sweden
- Museet för samtidskunst, Oslo, Norway
- Nyky taiteen museo, Helsinki, Finland
- Rogaland Kunstmuseum, Stavanger, Norway
- The Hasselblad Collection, Gothenburg, Sweden
- The National Public Art Council, Sweden
- Upplands Konstmuseum, Uppsala, Sweden
- Örebro Läns Landsting, Sweden
