= Inta Ruka =

Latvian photographer (born 1958)

- Born: 1958 (age 67–68); Riga, Latvian SSR, Soviet Union
- Known for: Photography

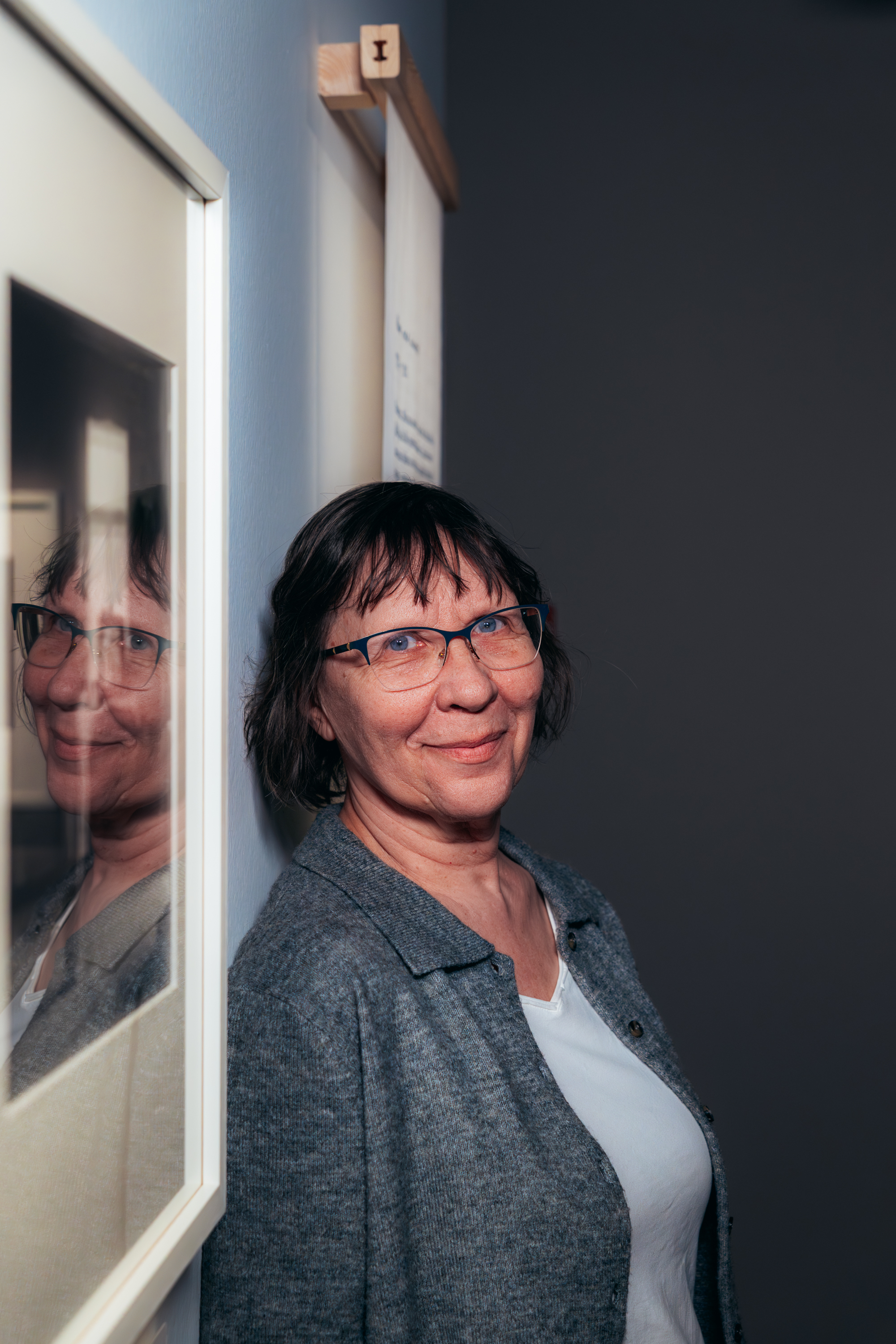
Portrait of Inta Ruka

Inta Ruka (born 1958) is a Latvian photographer.

== Life and work ==
Ruka was born in Riga. She married Egons Spuris, a Latvian photographer. Towards the end of the 1970s, she started her career in photography. In 2006, she worked on another photographic series, Neighbours. Additionally, she received a scholarship of the IASPIS for "two-month artist-in-residence" in Stockholm in 2007, and was given "the highest award of the 'Order of the Three Stars' of the State of Latvia", "Chevalier" ("Knight"), in 2009. Since the end of the 1980s, Ruka has had about twenty exhibitions alone both abroad and in Latvia. She has also taken part in an abundance of group exhibitions worldwide.

Ruka worked with Rolleiflex cameras up until 2004. She would put the Rolleiflex camera on a tripod, and photograph using natural light, waiting until the right light came. Anna Tellgren states that Ruka works with gelatin silver printing paper. This shows her connection to an older generation. Ruka had followed the path of portrait photography and also improved it. According to Tellgren (2017), Ruka described the way she worked as documentary. When working on her own projects, she was self-employed.

According to Tellgren, Ruka is interested in people which is why she takes photographs. More specifically, she focuses on individuals, not groups. She wants to show that each person has a meaning and purpose in society.

Ruka received a scholarship from the Hasselblad Foundation in 1998, the Spīdola Award of the Latvian Culture Foundation in 1999 and a scholarship from the Villa Waldberta in Feldafing in 2002. One year later, the Artist's Union of Latvia awarded her the "Prize of the Year 2003."

Ruka's photographs have been presented in several important international exhibitions. In 1999, she took part at the 48th Biennale of Venice which publicised her name internationally. In 2006, the Photography Centre in Istanbul organised a large solo show of her photos. Before 2007, her photographs had been shown with works by Wolfgang Tillmans, Boris Mikhailov and others in the exhibition In the Face of History: European Photographers in the 20th Century at the Barbican Arts Centre in London.

From 1984 to 2000, Ruka photographed the people of Latvia, primarily in the rural area of Balvi ("My Country People") and, later on, increasingly in the capital of Riga. In the series People I happened to meet, she strikes up conversations with unknown people in order to ask them for a portrait. By contrast, in Amalias Street 5, she focuses on the inhabitants of some apartments in Riga. Off the beaten track of the picturesque Old Town, with its extensive restoration, she provides an undisguised view on the current state of flux in Latvia since its integration into the European Union.

Among photographers of the former Soviet bloc countries, Ruka shares her documentary-anthropological approach with Antanas Sutkus and Boris Mikhailov; internationally with those of the Americans Walker Evans and Dorothea Lange.

== Exhibitions ==
- 2026: Places Called Home, Fotografiska Tallinn, Estonia.

== Awards ==
- 2009: Order of the Three Stars (V class)

== Documentary films about Ruka ==
- Photo - Inta Ruka – documentary film by Arvīds Krievs, Latvia
- The photographer from Riga – documentary film by Maud Nycander, Mantaray film, for Swedish Television 2009
