= Gerry Johansson =

Swedish photographer (born 1945)

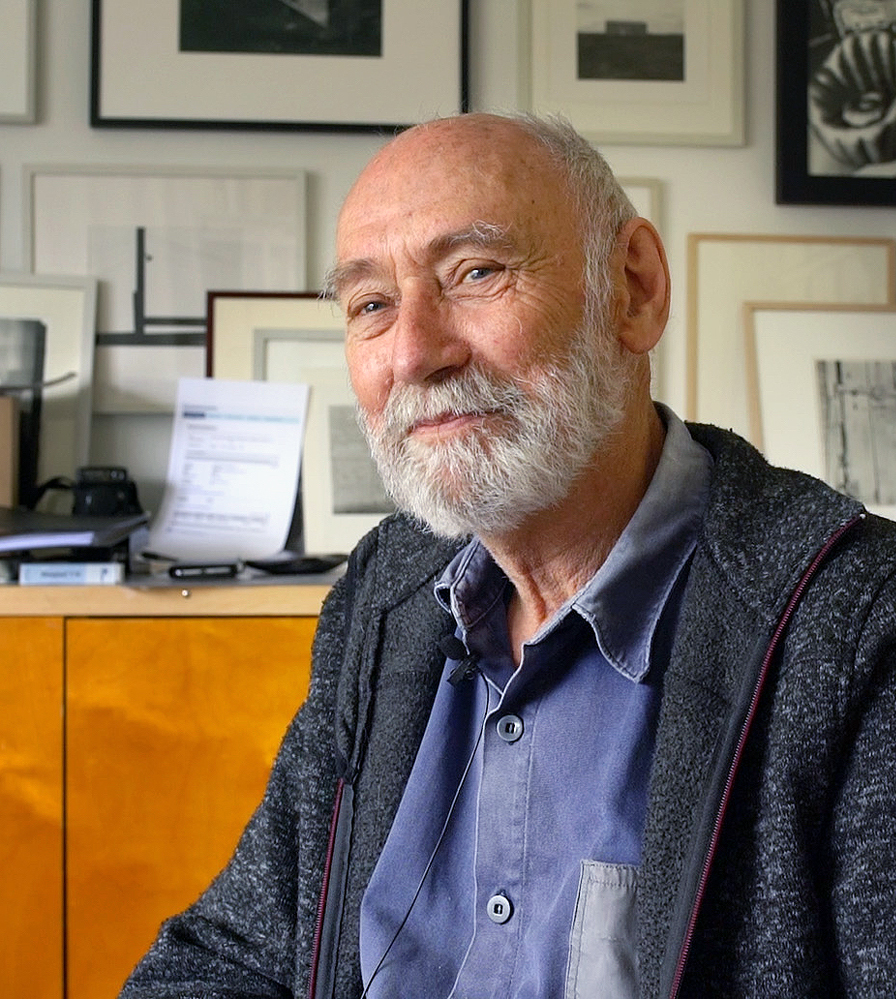
- Gerry Johansson 2021
- Born: 5 May 1945 (age 81); Örebro, Sweden
- Occupation: Photographer
- Website: http://www.gerryjohansson.com/

Gerry Johansson (born 5 May 1945) is a Swedish photographer who lives in Höganäs in southern Sweden. He makes "straight and pragmatic" photographs with "an objective view of a geographic location." His books include America, Sweden, Germany, Antarctic, Tokyo, and American Winter. His work is held in the collection of Moderna Museet in Stockholm, Sweden, where he has had solo exhibitions. He has been awarded the Region Skånes kulturpris and the Lars Tunbjörk Prize.

== Life and work ==
Johansson was born in Örebro, Örebro County, Sweden and grew up in Varberg, Halland County, Sweden. He started photographing at age 11 and began printing his own pictures at age 15. After high school he lived with relatives in New Jersey, USA for a year. He studied for a degree in graphic design at Konstindustriskolan in Gothenburg (now the School of Design and Crafts at the University of Gothenburg), between 1965 and 1969, then worked for a photography magazine. He worked for fifteen years as a graphic designer. In 1972 he co-founded the publishing house Fyra Förläggare, specialising in photography magazines and photobooks, usually with work by Swedish documentary photographers. In 1985 he left Fyra Förläggare to work as an independent photographer.

Johansson makes "straight and pragmatic" photographs with "an objective view of a geographic location." "Almost all of his 31 photobooks are defined by their geography, if not the subject matter, and their equally-sized photographs are generally organised either alphabetically or chronologically, a bid to encourage readers to interpret them individually." He predominantly uses black and white film, which he develops and prints himself. His favourite camera is a Rolleiflex.

Johansson's book American Winter (2018) was made in the mid-western states of the USA—Kansas, Nebraska, South Dakota, North Dakota, Montana, Wyoming and Colorado—in 2017/2018, over two three-week trips.

== Personal life ==
Johansson is married to Ann Jansson, who makes ceramic art. They live in Strandbaden, near to Höganäs in Skåne County, southern Sweden.

== Publications ==
=== Books of work by Johansson ===
- Fotografier 1976–80. Self-published, 1980. Catalogue of an exhibition at Galleri 1+1. Edition of 1000 copies.
- Halland. Fyra Förläggare, 1985. Photographs from Halland, 1932 by C. G. Rosenberg, rephotographed between 1983 and 1985 by Johansson. Text by Jan Olsheden. Edition of 1500 copies.
- Betong. 1992.
- Amerika = America. 1998. Edition of 1200 copies.
- Sverige = Sweden. Stockholm: Byggförlaget, 2005. ISBN 9179882692. Photographs from Sweden between 1988 and 2005. Published to coincide with an exhibition at Fotografins Hus in Stockholm.
  - Stockholm: Byggförlaget, 2009. Edition of 100 copies.
- Kvidinge. Höganäs, Sweden: Johansson and Jansson, 2007. ISBN 978-9-19763-261-4. Edition of 450 copies.
- Fyrbodal. 2007.
- Ulan Bator. Stockholm: Gun Gallery, 2009. Edition of 400 copies.
- Dalen. Stockholm: Libraryman, 2010. Edition of 300 copies.
- Pontiac. London: Mack, 2011. ISBN 978-1907946097. Edition of 1000 copies.
- God Jul och Gott Nytt År önskar Ann och Gerry. 2011.
- Deutschland = Germany. London: Mack, 2012. ISBN 978-1907946356. Edition of 1200 copies.
- Öglunda. Stockholm: Gun Gallery, 2012. Edition of 500 copies.
- Hattfabriken/Luckenwalde. Johansson & Jansson, 2012. Edition of 1000 copies.
- Antarktis = Antarctic. Stockholm: Libraryman, 2014. ISBN 978-9186269302. Edition of 700 copies. With a text by Thorbjörn Andersson in Swedish and English.
- Tree Stone Water. Stockholm: Libraryman, 2015. Edition of 400 copies.
- Tokyo. Berlin: Only Photography, 2016. With a text by Kamo no Chomei. Edition of 1200 copies.
- Ravenna. Osservatorio Fotografico, 2016. Edition of 350 copies. Second edition of 300 copies.
- Tyre Choice. Stockholm: Libraryman, 2017.
- Supplement: Deutschland. Johansson & Jansson, 2018. Edition of 1000 copies.
- Härryda Kommun. Johansson & Jansson, 2018.
- America Revised. Berlin: Only Photography, 2018. A collection of over 50 years of his work on the continent.
- American Winter. London: Mack, 2018. ISBN 9781912339235. Edition of 2500 copies.
- Halland. Johansson & Jansson, 2019.
- Borås. Johansson & Jansson, 2019.
- Meloni Meloni. Self-published, 2020. ISBN 9789198500738. Edition of 750 copies. With texts in English, Italian and Swedish.
- Ehime. Tokyo: T&M, 2020. ISBN 978-4-909442-14-7. Edition of 800 copies.
- Lalendof und Klaber. Johansson & Jansson, 2020.
- At Home in Sweden, Germany and America. Sweden: Tira, 2020. ISBN 9789198606805.
- Maine. Ice Plant, 2024. ISBN 979-8985733051.

=== Books of work with others ===
- Från Skåne. Malmö, Sweden: Malmö Konsthall, 1992. With work by Dawid, Johansson and Ralph Nykvist. With a text by Jacques Werup. Catalogue of an exhibition
- Trivia. 1992. With work by Johansson, Carl-Johan Malmberg and Gunnar Smoliansky. Photographs and texts from EKODOK 90. ISBN 91-86074-12-1. Published to coincide with an exhibition at Moderna Museet, Stockholm, Sweden. Edition of 100 copies.
- Verso Nord. Stuttgart: Hartmann, 2022. With Guido Guidi. Edited by Stefania Rössl and Massimo Sordi. ISBN 978-3-96070-080-7. With text, Rössl in conversation with Guidi and Johansson. Two volumes. In Italian and English. Photographs made around Castelfranco Veneto, Italy.

== Awards ==
- 2011: Region Skånes kulturpris, Skåne Regional Council, Skåne County, Sweden
- 2019: Lars Tunbjörk Prize, Tore G Wärenstam Foundation, Borås, Sweden
- 2020: Höganäs Municipality's cultural award, Skåne County, Sweden
- 2024: Prince Eugen Medal

== Exhibitions ==
=== Solo exhibitions ===
- Moderna Museet, Stockholm, Sweden, 1982
- Odd weeks, Moderna Museet, Stockholm, Sweden, 2003
- Moment, Moderna Museet, Stockholm, Sweden, 2012/2013

=== Group exhibitions ===
- Framed Landscapes: European Photography Commissions 1984–2019, Museo ICO, Madrid, Spain, 2019, part of PhotoEspaña

== Collections ==
Johansson's work is held in the following permanent collection:

- Moderna Museet, Stockholm, Sweden: over 40 photographs (as of January 2019)
