= Lars Tunbjörk =

Swedish photographer

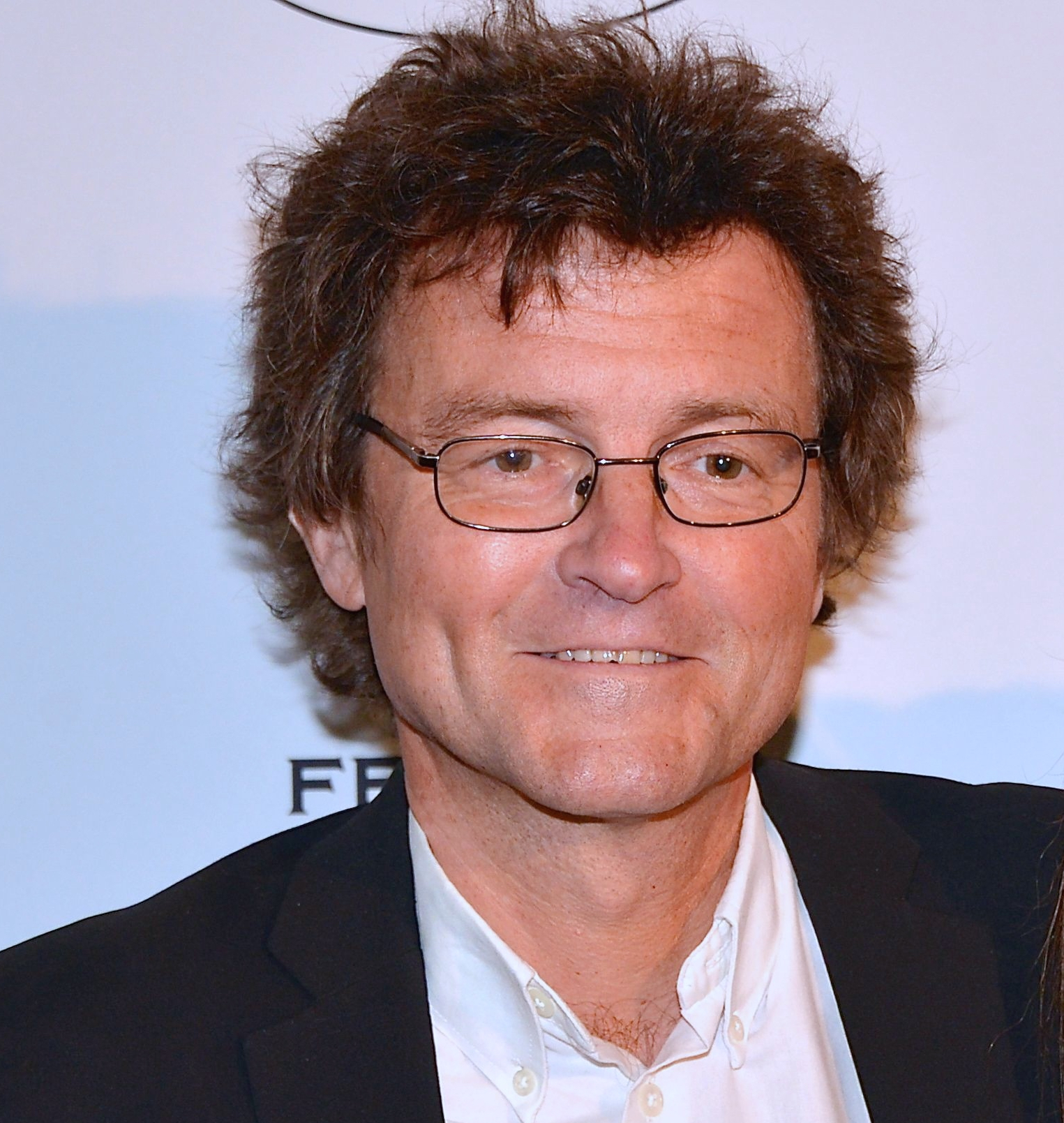
- Tunbjörk at the 48th Guldbagge Awards in 2013
- Born: 15 February 1956; Borås, Sweden
- Died: 8 April 2015 (aged 59); Stockholm, Sweden
- Occupation: Photographer
- Years active: 1971–2015

Lars Tunbjörk (15 February 1956 – 8 April 2015) was a Swedish photographer known for his "deadpan portraits of office spaces and suburban lifestyles".

== Background ==
Tunbjörk was born in the Swedish town of Borås, a place which was a big influence for his work throughout his career. He was also influenced early on by Swedish photographer Christer Stromholm and American photographer William Eggleston.

His photographs can be found in the collections of the Museum of Modern Art, the Centre Pompidou and the Maison Européenne de la Photographie in Paris. Tunbjörk was a member of Agence Vu and worked for The New York Times Magazine, Time, GEO, and others.

== Exhibitions ==
- 1993: Hasselblad center, Gothenburg
- 1994: Nordiska museet, Stockholm
- 1995: International Center of Photography, New York City
- 1998: Fotografisk Center, Copenhagen, Denmark
- 1999: Galerie Vu, Paris, France
- 2002: Arbetets museum, Norrköping
- 2002: Kulturhuset, Stockholm
- 2002: Home, Hasselblad Center, Gothenburg
- 2004: Moskva Fotobiennal, Russia
- 2004: Hembygd, Borås konstmuseum
- 2007: Open Eye Gallery, Liverpool,
- 2007: Winter/Home, Moderna Museet
- 2011: L.A Office, Shop, Wunderbaum, Skellefteå Konsthall
- 2018: Retrospective, Fotografiska, Stockholm.
