= JH Engström =

Swedish photographer (born 1969)

JH Engström (born 1969) is a Swedish photographer, filmmaker and artist based in Paris.

== Biography ==
Born in 1969 in Karlstad, Sweden, JH Engström has been developing for two decades a major work that questions the conditions of our existence in the form of installations consisting of photographs, films and books.

His work has a strong autobiographical dimension, based on the experience of an artist in movement – JH Engström has lived in Sweden, the United States and France – questions the role of private memory, the relationship to our origins, the link between the urban and natural environment, and the modes of representation and domination in our contemporary societies.

His work has been the subject of numerous monographic exhibitions at the Varmlands Museum (Sweden, 2017 and 2009), FOAM Amsterdam (Netherlands, 2014), the National Media Museum, Bradford (United Kingdom, 2010) or the Hasselblad Center, Gothenburg (Sweden, 2005). His works are housed in the collections of the Fotomuseum Winterthur (Winterthur, Switzerland), the Museum of Fine Arts, Houston (United States), the Museum of Modern Art / Moderna Museet in Stockholm (Sweden) or the Musée Nicéphore Nièpce (Chalon-sur-Saône, France). He is the author of critically acclaimed books and winners of international awards, including the trilogy consisting of Trying to Dance (published by Journal in 2003), Tout va bien (Aperture, 2015) and Revoir (Akio Nagasawa Publishing / Journal, 2017). JH Engström currently lives between the Swedish region of Värmland and Paris.

== Education ==
- Assistant to Mario Testino in Paris, 1991–1992.
- Apprenticeship with Anders Petersen in Stockholm, 1993–1994.
- Graduated from the department of photography and film at the University of Gothenburg, Sweden, 1997.
- Graduated from the Dramatic Institute in Stockholm, specialising in the creation of documentary films, 2005.

== Monographs ==
- Härbärge/Shelter. Bokförlaget DN, 1997. Winner of "The photographic book of the year in Sweden" 1998. ISBN 9175881888.
- Trying to Dance. Stockholm: Journal, 2004. ISBN 91-974182-6-9.
- Haunts. Göttingen: Steidl, 2006. ISBN 3-86521-297-2.
- CDG / JHE. Göttingen: Steidl, 2008. ISBN 978-3-86521-538-3.
- Sketch of Home Gun Gallery, 2008. ISBN 978-91-977658-1-7.
- From Back Home. Stockholm: Bokförlaget Max Ström, 2009. With Anders Petersen. ISBN 978-91-7126-164-9.
- La Résidence Journal,2010. Awarded the Goldene Letter by Deutche Buch Stiftung. ISBN 9789197762557.
- Foreign Affair With Margot Wallard. Tokyo: Super Labo, 2012.
- 7 days ATHENS November 2011 With Margot Wallard. Tokyo: Super Labo, 2012.
- Långt från Stockholm London: Mörel, 2013. ISBN 978-1-90707-138-6.
- Ende und Anfang – Early Trips André Frère Éditions, 2013. ISBN 979-10-92265-08-8.
- Sketch of Paris Aperture, 2013. ISBN 9781597112536.
- Karaoke Sunne With Margot Wallard. Tokyo: Super Labo, 2014. Edition of 1000 copies.
- Tout Va Bien Aperture, 2015. ISBN 978-1-59711-349-6.
- Random. Mörel, 2015.
- October 2016: Fear of Leaving. London: Mörel, 2016.
- Revoir. Stockholm: Journal; Tokyo: Akio Nagasawa, 2016. ISBN 9789187939167. With a text by fr:Christian Caujolle. Edition of 600 copies.
- Crash Tokyo: Akio Nagasawa Publishing, 2017.
- Day by Day. Paris: Bessard 2020. Edition of 600 copies.
- Photo Poche Actes Sud, 2021. ISBN 978-2-330-15092-1.
- L'EcartPrinted with copy machine 28/11 at Le Bal
- The Frame: Pierre Von Kliest 2022.

== Filmography ==
- A Film about with Anders Petersen 2006. 52 minutes, directed and produced by JH Engström, edited by Kasja Grandell.
- Bertil & Maggan 2006. 28 minutes, written and directed by JH Engström, produced by Jenny Örnborn.
- Har/Ici/Here 2018. 4 minutes, 42 seconds, directed, produced, and edited by JH Engström.
- Ordet/Le Mot/The Word 2017. 6 hours, directed by JH Engström.
- Djuret/L'Animal/The Animal 2020. 4 minutes, 43 seconds. Directed by JH Engström.
- TIDIGT/TÔT/EARLY 2022. 4 minutes 56 seconds, directed by JH Engström.

== Grants and awards ==
- Bildhuset grant for young photographers, 1996.
- Stockhölm Cultural award, 1998.
- Grant from The Andrea Frank Foundation, 1998
- Winner of The photographic book of the year in Sweden for Härbärge/Shelter, 1998
- Grant from the Swedish Authors Foundation, 1998
- Grant from The Swedish Arts Council, 1999
- Grant from the Swedish Authors Foundation, 2004
- Grant from Hasselblad Center, 2004
- Artist in residence at Contretype, Brussels, 2003
- Grant from the Swedish Arts Council, 2004
- Artist in residence at Musée de Niepce, Chalon-sur-Saône, 2004
- Shortlisted for the Deutsche Börse Photography Prize, 2005, for Trying to Dance
- Grant from The Swedish Authors Foundation, 2005
- Grant from Swedish Arts Council, 2006–10
- Grant from KW Gullers fund, 2008
- Winner of the photo book award at Arles photo festival for the

book From Back Home, together with Anders Petersen, 2009

- Grant from the Swedish Arts Council, 2011–16
- Goldene Letter for the book La Résidence, given by Deutsche

Buch Stiftung, 2012

- Winner of the Leica Oskar Barnack award for ‘Tout Va Bien’, 2015

- Prince Eugen Medal for artistic achievement, 2026

== Solo Exhibitions ==
- Entreacte Gallery F48, Stockholm, Sweden, 2000.
- Shelter, The Nordic Museum, Stockholm, 2002.
- Trying to Dance, Artotèque d'Angers, Angers, France, 2002.
- Trying to Dance, Contretype, Brussels, 2002.
- Trying to dance, Galerie VU‚ Paris, France, 2004.
- Haunts, Hasselblad Center, Gothenburg, Sweden, 2005.
- Je Suis Où, Contretype, Brussels, 2006.
- Milliken, Stockholm, Sweden, 2006.
- Haunts, Fotografins Hus, Stockholm, Sweden, 2006.
- Haunts, Galerie VU, Paris, France, 2006.
- Trying to Dance, Nantes Photofestival, Nantes, France.
- Trying to Dance/ Haunts, Huarte Art Center, Huarte, Spain, 2007.
- Deutsche Börse Photography Prize, The Photographers' Gallery, London, 2005. With Luc Delahaye, Jörg Sasse and Stephen Shore.
- Sketch of Home, GUN Gallery, Stockholm, Sweden, 2008.
- From Back Home, together with Anders Petersen, Artotheque

Angers, France, 2009.

- From Back Home, together with Anders Petersen, Galerie VU, Paris, France, 2009.
- From Back Home, together with Anders Petersen, Värmlands Museum, Sweden, 2009.
- Trying to Dance / Haunts, Centre Atlantique de la Photographie, Brest, France, 2009.
- Trying to Dance/ Haunts Galerie Le Lieux, Lorient, France, 2009.
- From Back Home, National Science and Media Museum, Bradford, UK, 2010. With Anders Petersen.
- La residence, GUN Gallery, Stockholm, Sweden, 2011.
- From Back Home, together with Anders Petersen, Flinxo Gallery,

Gent, Belgium, 2011.

- Tout Va Bien, Galleri Final, Malmö, Sweden, 2013.
- Close Surrounding, FOAM Amsterdam, Netherlands, 2014.
- Close Surrounding, Hôtel Fontfreyde – Centre photographique,

Clermont-Ferrand, France, 2015.

- Crash, Värmlands Museum, Sweden, 2016.
- JHE, Riga Photomonth 2016, Latvian Museum of Photography, Riga, Lithuania, 2016.
- Härifrån, The Finnish Museum of Photography, Helsinki, Finland, 2018.
- The Frame, Jean-Kenta Gauthier, Paris, 2018.
- The Frame, Appleton Lisbon, Portugal, 2019.
- Anknytningar/Correspondances/Correspondences, CAPC Villa Pérochon, Niort, France, 2020.
- Banquet, Jean-Kenta Gauthier, Paris, 2022.

== Group Exhibitions ==
- Territory, Stockholm Cultural House, Sweden, 1994.
- Tempo – A documentary Festival, Stockholm Cultural House, Sweden, 1998.
- Shelter/Café Lehmitz, With Anders Petersen, Gallery Prinsen in Stockholm, Sweden, 1998.
- Photographic Fair in Gothenburg, Sweden, 1998.
- Swedish Photography, Theatre des images, Nice, France, 2002.
- Inspiration Strömholm, Gallery CFF, Stockholm, Sweden, 2002.
- Stockholm too Close, Stockholm Cultural House, Sweden, 2002.
- Unstable, Stockholm Cultural House, Sweden, 2004.
- Milliken Gallery, Stockholm, Sweden. 2005.
- Faulconer Gallery, Grinnell, USA, 2005.
- Unstable, Bildmuseet, Umea, Sweden, 2005.
- Deutsche Börse Photography Prize, Photographers Gallery, London, UK, 2005.
- Der Traum vom Ich, der Traum von der Welt, Winterthur Fotomuseum, Switzerland, 2005.
- 'Deutsche Börse Group, Frankfurt, Germany, 2005.
- Gooroom project, South Korea, 2005.
- Langhans Galerie, Galerie VU, Prague, Czech Republic, 2005.
- Mois de la Photo, Paris, France, 2006.
- Caprice Horn Gallery, Berlin, Germany, 2006.
- Genre Humain, Brussels, Belgium Fotografins Hus, 2006.
- Face a Face Stockholm, Sweden
- Noorderlicht Photogallery, Groningen, Netherlands, 2006.
- D-Foto, San Sebastian, Spain, 2006.
- Cohan and Leslie Gallery, New York, USA, 2007.
- Darkside, Fotomuseum Winterthur, Switzerland, 2008.
- Arles Photofestival, show curated by Nan Goldin, Arles, France, 2009.
- Das Porträt. Fotographie als Bühne, Kunsthalle Wien, Das Porträt-Fotografie als Buhne, Austria, 2009.
- Darkside II, Darkside II, Winterthur Fotomuseum, Switzerland, 2009.
- La Residence, Contretype Photcenter, Brussels, Belgium, 2010.
- Liege Photobienale, Belgium, 2012.
- Out of Focus, Saatchi Gallery, London, UK 2012.
- Eyes Wild Open, commissioned by Marie Sordat, Botanique, Brussels, Belgium, 2018.

== Institution Collections ==
- Fotomuseum Winterthur, Winterthur, Switzerland.
- Hasselblad Center, Gothenburg, Sweden.
- The Museum of Fine Arts, Houston, Texas, USA.
- Moderna Museet, Stockholm, Sweden.
- Musée Nicéphore-Niépce, Chalon-Sure-Saône, France.
- The Nordic Museum in Stockholm, Sweden.
- Noorderlicht Photography Foundation, Grongingue, Netherlands.
- Saatchi Gallery, London, UK.
- Värmlands Museum, Karlstad, Sweden.
