= Tuija Lindström =

Finnish-Swedish photographer, artist, and professor

Tuija Lydia Elisabeth Lindström (5 May 1950 – 26 December 2017) was a Finnish-Swedish photographer, artist and professor of photography at School of Photography and Film, University of Gothenburg in Gothenburg, Sweden, 1992–2001. She lived and worked in Stockholm, Sweden.

In the early 1990s, she became very noted for her black and white pictures of women floating in a black lake, known as Girls at Bull's Pond. Her pictures at this time addressed feminist issues but from a different perspective than has previously been customary in Sweden.

She has held several international exhibitions. Her 2012 exhibition A Dream If Ever There Was One at the Hasselblad Center in Gothenburg presented an overview of her work including landscapes, portraits, nudes and still lifes in collaboration with Helsinki's Finnish Museum of Photography.

Lindström was Sweden's first female professor in photography at the University of Gothenburg, establishing a master's programme and laying the foundations for ongoing photographic research.

== Collections ==
Lindström's work is held in the following permanent collections:

- Moderna Museet, Stockholm: 18 prints (as of 13 September 2023)
- Museum of Fine Arts, Houston, Houston: 1 print (as of 13 September 2023)
- Finnish Museum of Photography, Helsinki
