= MARTa Herford =

Contemporary art museum in Herford, Germany

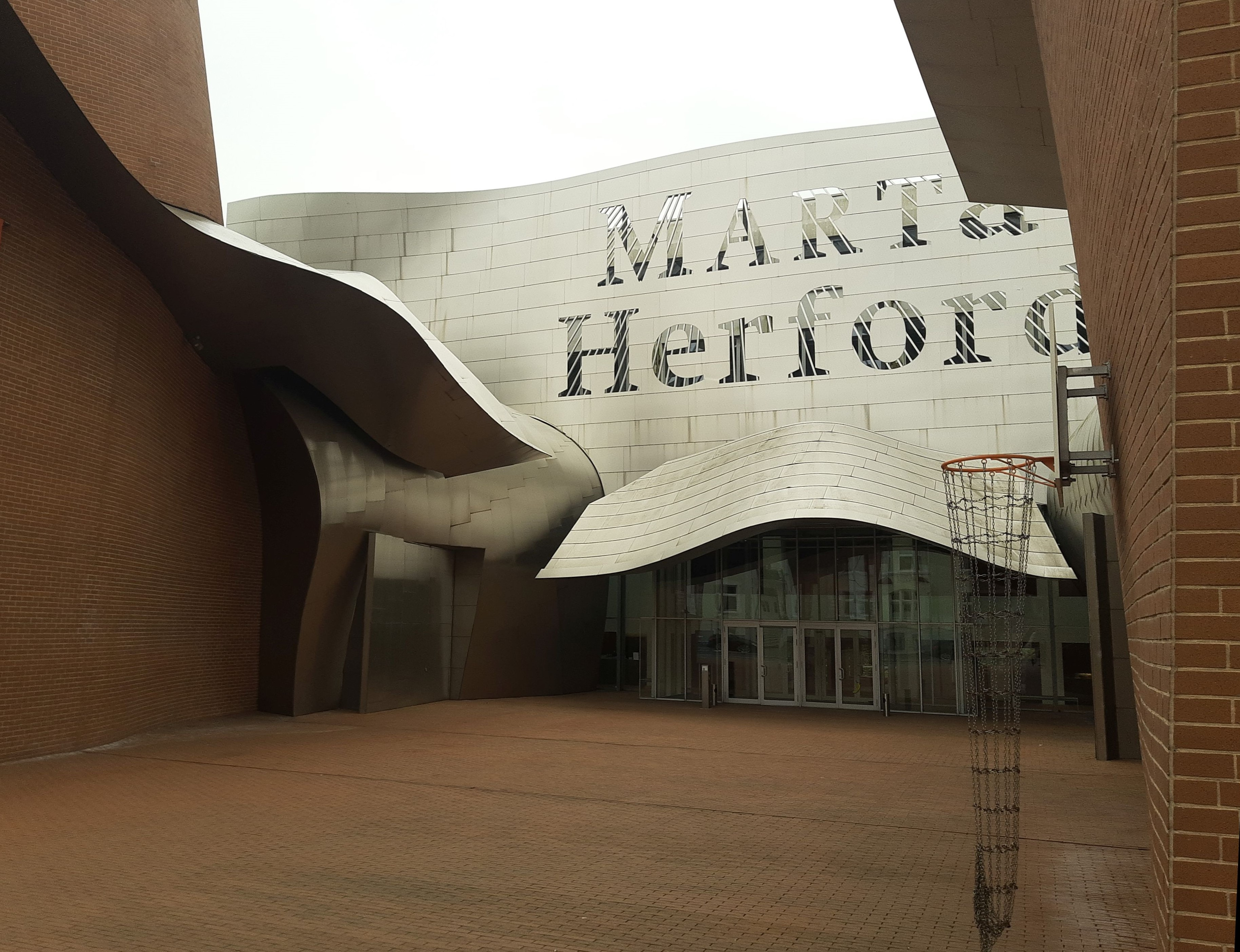
- Entrance, 2024
- Established: 2005
- Location: Herford, North Rhine-Westphalia, Germany
- Coordinates: 52.120982°N 8.668325°E
- Type: Station
- Website: https://marta-herford.de/en/

MARTa Herford is a contemporary art museum in Herford, Germany.

== Building and history ==
The idea for the museum formed in 2000, drawing from Herford's status as a German center of furniture and home furnishing production. The name MARTa is an acronym for Möbel (German for furniture), ART (simply art in English), and Ambiente (ambience). The founding director of the museum was Jan Hoet, a noted Belgian curator. Roland Nachtigäller took over as director in 2009. Kathleen Rahn followed as new director in 2022.

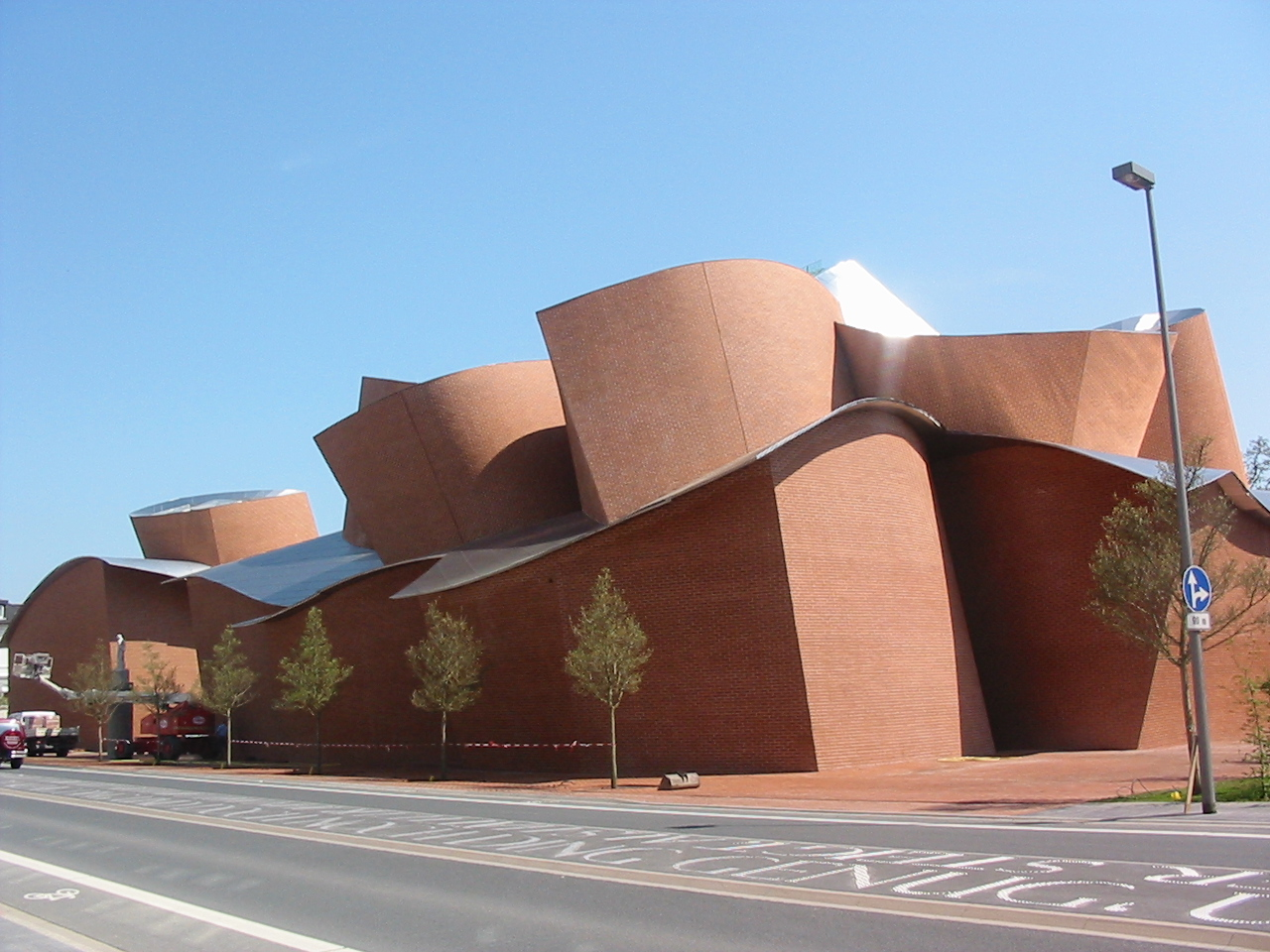
The museum from Goebenstrasse, a few days before opening

The building was designed by Frank Gehry and built by Archimedes GmbH. Construction began in 2001, and it officially opened to the public on 7 May 2005.

== Images ==
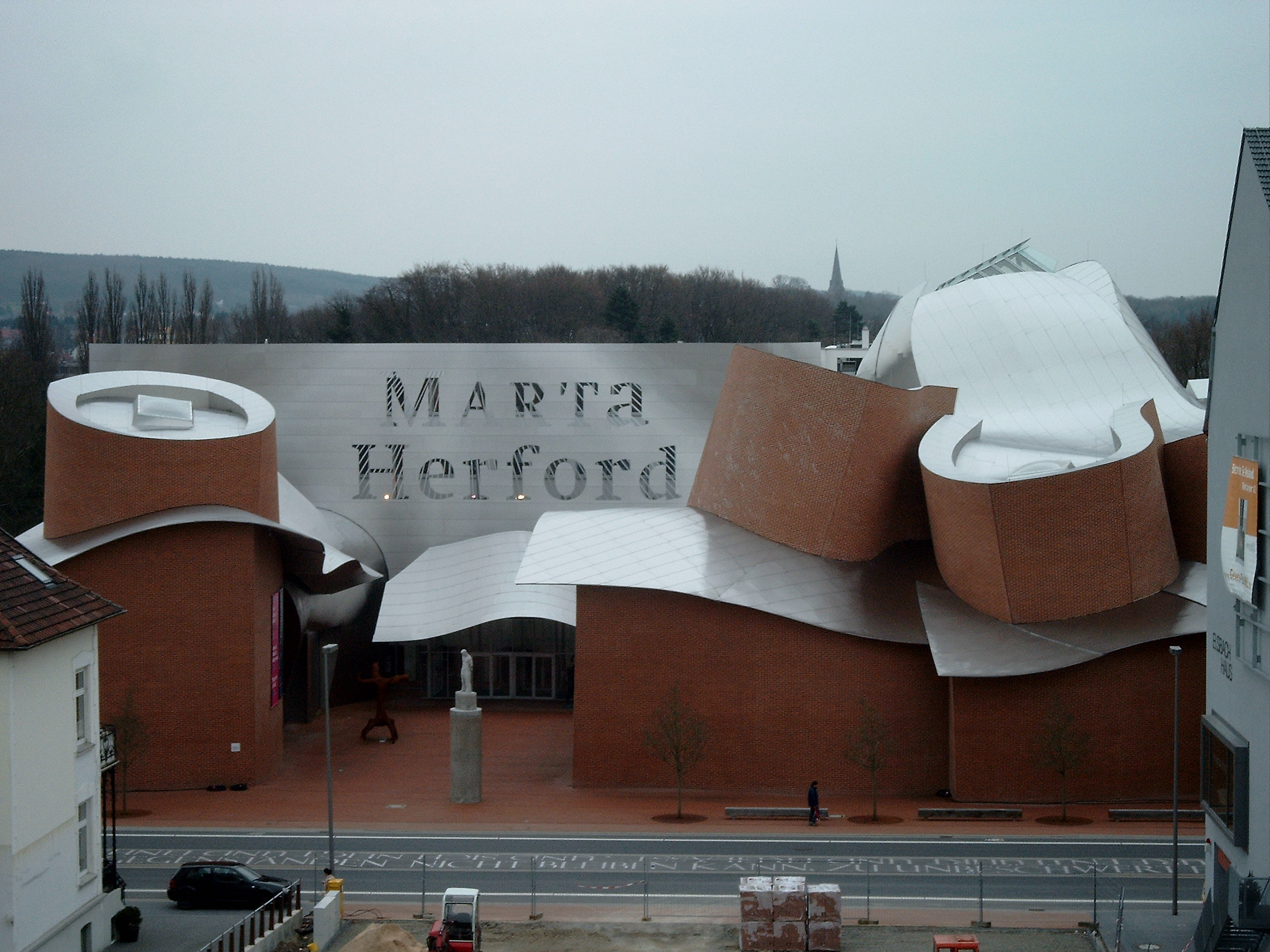
A photo from across the street, showing some of the roof detail, the Rilke poem inscribed on Goebenstrasse, and sculptures by the entrance

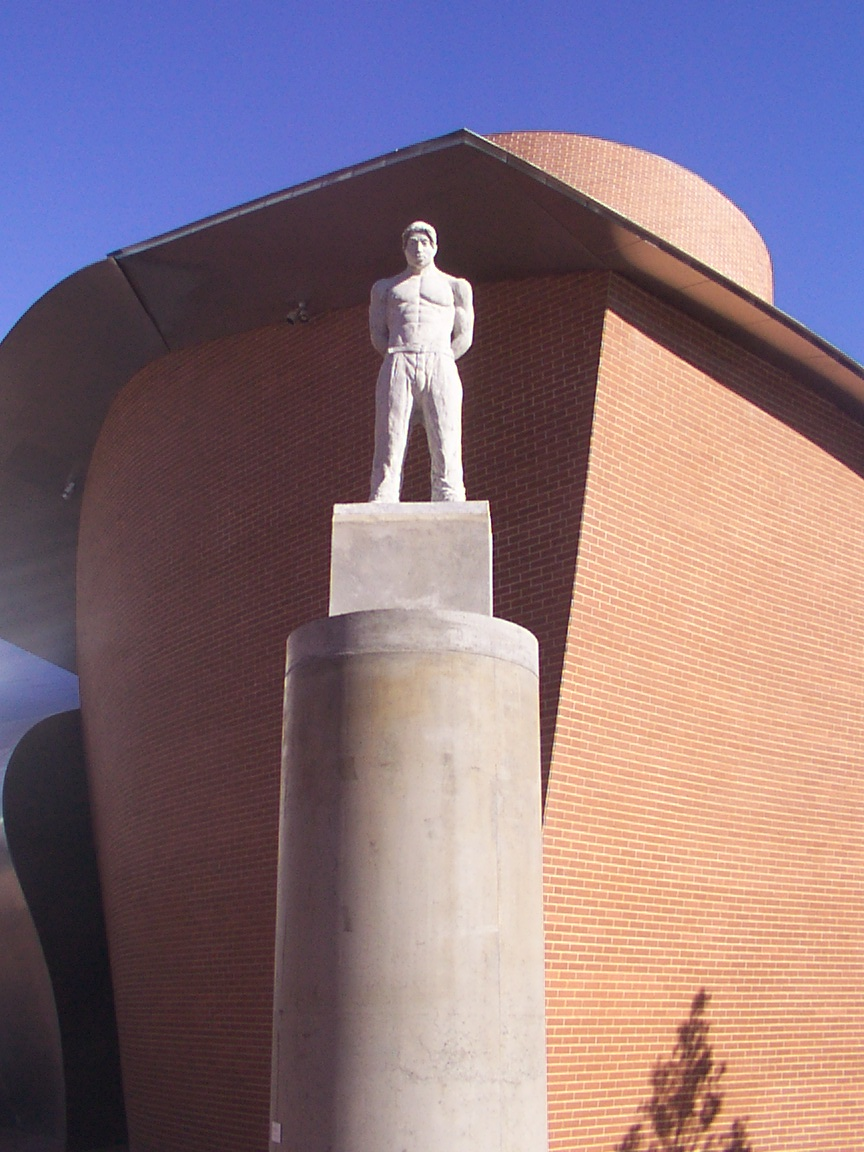
Statue of Tupac Shakur by Paolo Chiasera at the entrance

== See also ==
- List of works by Frank Gehry
