= Icakuriren =

Weekly family magazine in Sweden

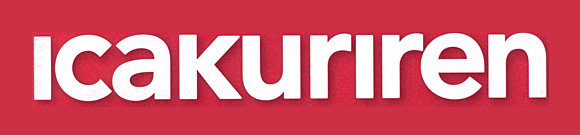
- Categories: Family magazine
- Frequency: Weekly
- Publisher: Forma Publishing Group
- Founded: 1942
- Company: Egmont Group
- Country: Sweden
- Based in: Solna, Stockholm
- Language: Swedish
- Website: Icakuriren
- ISSN: 0345-5068
- OCLC: 226304015

Icakuriren (lit. 'the ICA Courier') is a weekly family magazine based in Solna, Stockholm, Sweden. It is one of the most read weeklies in the country.

== History and profile ==
Icakuriren was started in 1942 by ICA private retail company as an alternative family magazine. During the initial phase it was distributed free of charge in the ICA shops. Marta Arnesen was one of the early editors of Icakuriren.

The magazine was owned by the Forma Publishing Group, a subsidiary of ICA Gruppen, until October 2014 when the company was acquired by the Egmont Group. Icakuriren is published on a weekly basis. It is mostly read by women. Common topics covered include food, travel guides, and buying advice. The magazine has its headquarters in Solna.

== Circulation ==
In the 1950s the circulation of Icakuriren was 700,000 copies. The magazine had a circulation of 184,900 copies in 2007. Next year the circulation dropped to 170,200. The magazine had a circulation of 98,000 copies in 2014 and 92,800 copies in 2015.
