= Kenneth Gustavsson (photographer) =

Swedish photographer

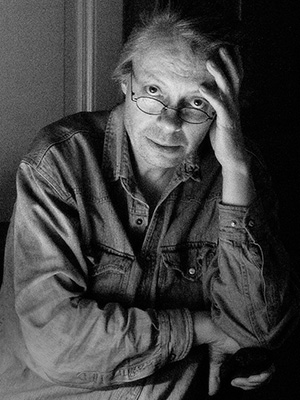
- Born: 7 April 1946
- Died: 21 December 2009 (aged 63)
- Occupation: Photographer
- Known for: Saftra photo agency

Kenneth Gustavsson (7 April 1946 – 21 December 2009) was a Swedish photographer.

== Career and work ==
Gustavsson grew up in a suburb north west of Stockholm. Between 1964 and 1967 he studied photography at the Fotoskolan in Stockholm, where the photographer Christer Strömholm was head, at the same time as Anders Petersen. After graduation in 1967, he and Petersen co-founded the Saftra photo agency (Saftra Reportage Fotografi).

The Swedish photo magazine Foto published Gustavsson's work in the 1960s. Together with Anders Petersen, Gustavsson portrayed the Stockholm slums in an exhibition at the Stockholm City Museum in 1969. After not working in photography for most of the 1970s, a feature in ETC magazine in 1983 revived Gustavsson's career and he went on to complete assignments in Belfast, Chicago, Reykjavik and New York for ETC. In 1984 he was awarded FOTO magazine's Photographer's Price.

The critic Gerry Badger has said of Gustavsson's work that "it certainly is very post-war, deeply existential and luminously poetic. And, like most good photography, it is a beguiling exploration of the human condition and our relationship with the world."

== Exhibitions ==
- Staden i retur, Stockholm City Museum, 1969. With Anders Petersen.
- Galleri Gauss, Stockholm, 1984
- Just Images. PS1, New York, 1985. Group exhibition.
- Contemporary Black and White West European Photography, 1987. Group exhibition.
- Fotofest, Houston, TX, 1988. Group exhibition.
- 150th Anniversary of Photography, Prague, 1989. Group exhibition.
- Indicier (Indications). Kulturhuset, Stockholm, 1996. With Christer Strömholm and Anders Petersen.
- Reality Revisited. Moderna Museet, 2009
- See the World. Moderna Museet, 2011
- The Magic Bar. Fotografiska museum, Stockholm, 2012. Photographs taken in Sweden, Germany and France from the late 1960s to the early 1990s.
- A Way of Life. Moderna Museet, Malmö, 2014
