= Gunnar Smoliansky =

Swedish photographer (1933–2019)

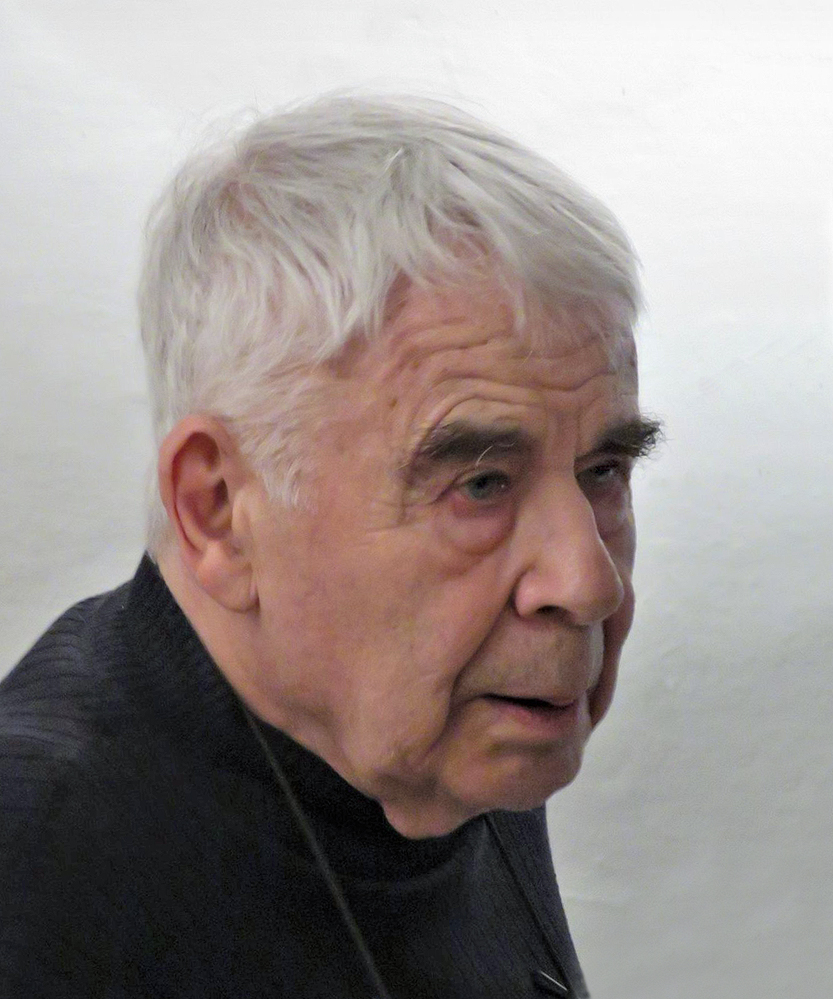
- Gunnar Smoliansky 2017.
- Born: 11 July 1933; Visby, Sweden
- Died: 12 December 2019 (aged 86); Boo, Sweden
- Occupation: Photographer

Gunnar Smoliansky (11 July 1933 – 12 December 2019) was a Swedish photographer.

== Biography ==
Born in Visby, Gotland. Smoliansky studied photography at a school led by Christer Strömholm which he graduated at 1956. After having worked as industrial photographer, Smoliansky became independent. In 1975, Smoliansky and others founded the Bildhuset Agency. In 1980, he won the Stora Fotographpriset from Photo magazine. In 2005, Smoliansky won the Prix Lennart af Petersens.
