= Christer Strömholm =

Swedish photographer

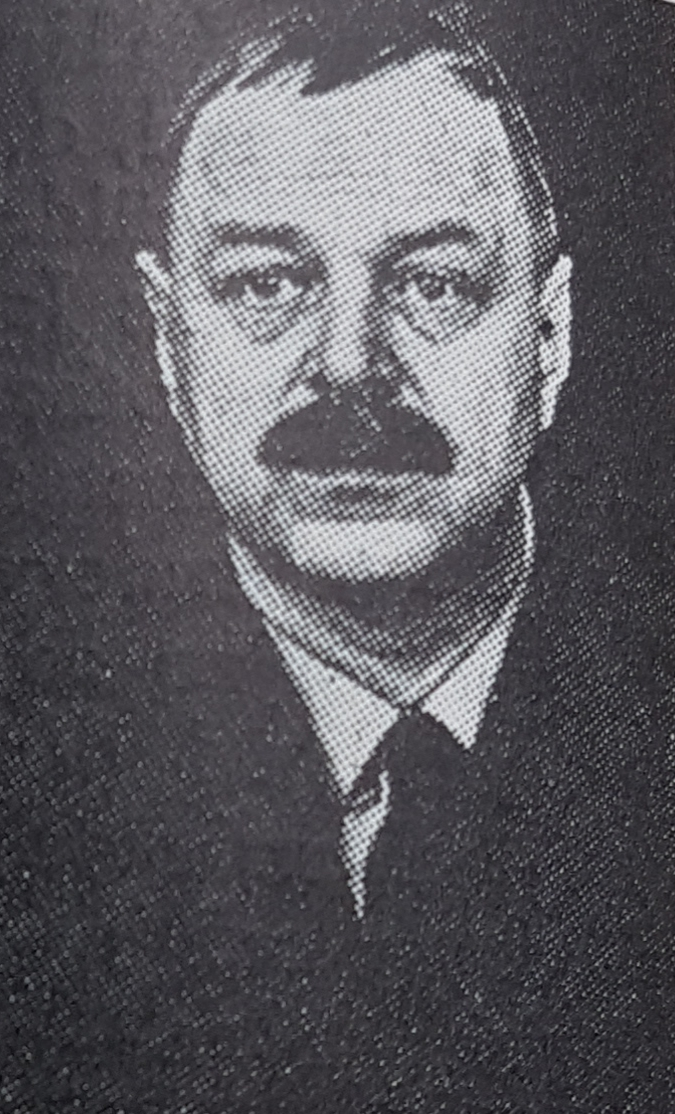
- Born: Ture Christer Strömholm; 18 July 1918; Vaxholm, Sweden
- Died: 11 January 2002 (aged 83); Stockholm, Sweden
- Other name: Christer Christian (pseudonym)
- Occupation: Photographer
- Spouse(s): Ellen Anna Hollender (m. 1944; div. 1945) Dagny Maria Andersson (m. 1946; div. 1951) Inga Svensson (m. 1951; div. 1954) Ingrid Anna-Clara Krusenberg (m. 1957; div. 1968) Lena Marie Mattisson (m. 1990; div. 1990)
- Partner(s): Angelica Julner (1969–1978); Ingalill Rydberg (1978–1988)
- Relatives: Stig Strömholm (half-brother); Sten Strömholm (half-brother)

Ture Christer Strömholm (22 July 1918 – 11 January 2002), also known by the pseudonym Christer Christian, was a Swedish photographer and educator. He is known for his intimate black and white street photography portrait series, particularly his portraits of transgender women in Paris. Strömholm received the 1997 Hasselblad Award.

== Life and career ==
Strömholm was born in Vaxholm, Sweden, to Lizzie Strömholm and Fredrik Strömholm, an army officer. His childhood was marked by family instability. The family moved frequently, and in 1924 his parents divorced, but remarried shortly thereafter. In 1934, Strömholm's father died by suicide.

Beginning in 1932, Strömholm was active in the Nazi Nordic Youth movement, modelled after Hitler Youth. He led one of its cells during this time, and in 1936 hoisted a flag of a swastika on the People's House in Stockholm. Over the course of his young adulthood, however, his political perspective changed; he joined the Swedish Volunteer Corps at the age of 21, and supported the Norwegian resistance movement later in the war.

In 1937 Strömholm travelled to Dresden to study art under the German painter Woldemar Winkler. However, he came into conflict with Paul Klee and other Bauhaus artists, and his stay in Dresden was brief.

In 1938, Christer Strömholm and other young Nazis broke into the socialist organization Clarté's offices and stole membership lists. He was sentenced to conditional labor. In 1945, after the end of the war, Strömholm sheltered Norwegian Nazis and war criminals on the run who had been volunteers in the Waffen-SS. He was convicted for this in court.

Strömholm was a member of Otto Steinert's Fotoform group of photographers for subjective photography. He co-founded Fotoskolan academy in Stockholm in 1962 and was its director. Alumni of the school include production designer Anna Asp, cinematographer Bille August, and photographers Anders Petersen, Björn Dawidsson (Dawid), and Gunnar Smoliansky. He is noted for his depictions of transsexual women in the Place Blanche area of 1950-1960s' Paris, published as Les amies de Place Blanche. The historian Philip Charrier has investigated how Strömholm represents his Place Blanche trans subjects relative to their own self-narratives and period societal views on transness. The critic Sean O'Hagan, writing in The Guardian, said he "is known as the father of Swedish photography both for his abiding influence and for his role as a teacher."

In 1998 Strömholm received the 1997 Hasselblad Award. The award citation described him as "one of Scandinavia's leading photographers, and [...] the first post-war photographer to gain international renown".

== Books ==
- Poste Restante. P. A. Norstedt & Söners Förlag, 1967. With a transcript of an interview with Strömholm, "Before the Photographs." Swedish-language edition.
  - Stockholm: Art & Theory, 2016. ISBN 9789188031365. With a transcript of an interview with Strömholm, "Before the Photographs." English-language edition.
- Les Amies de Place Blanche. ETC Sweden, 1983
- Kloka ord (Wise Words). Legus, 1997. ISBN 978-9-188192-42-4. A collection of aphorisms and work notes.
- Imprints. Hasselblad Center, 1998. ISBN 9163064839
- Nueve Segundos De Mi Vida. Mexico: Conaculta / Centro de la Imagen, 1999. ISBN 978-9701829301
- On Verra Bien. Bildverksamheten Strömholm & Färgfabriken, 2002. ISBN 91-973787-6-3
- Christer Strömholm. Photo Poche. Arles, France: Actes Sud, 2006. ISBN 978-2-742760-26-8
- Poste Restante. Göttingen, Germany: Steidl, 2011. ISBN 978-3-865212-20-7
- Les Amies de Place Blanche. Stockport, Cheshire: Dewi Lewis, 2012. ISBN 978-1-907893-15-5; and Villejuif, France: Aman Iman, 2013. ISBN 2953391053. Re-edited from the original edition.
- Post Scriptum Christer Strömholm. Stockholm: Max Strom, 2013. ISBN 978-9-171262-49-3
- Gedin, Andreas (2025). Christer Strömholm och nazismen: hur en liten sanning döljer en större (in Swedish). Stockholm: Kaunitz-Olsson. ISBN 978-91-89924-12-3.

== Awards ==
- 1998: 1997 Hasselblad Award.

== Exhibitions ==
- Les Amies de Place Blanche, International Center for Photography, New York, 2012.
