= 2015 in science =

A number of significant scientific events occurred in 2015. Gene editing based on CRISPR significantly improved. A new human-like species, Homo naledi, was first described. Gravitational waves were observed for the first time (announced publicly in 2016), and dwarf planets Pluto and Ceres were visited by spacecraft for the first time. The United Nations declared 2015 the International Year of Soils and Light-based Technologies.

== Events ==
=== January ===
- 2 January – A study published in Science shows evidence that a protein partially assembles another protein without genetic instructions. Defying textbook science, amino acids (the building blocks of a protein) can be assembled by another protein and without genetic instructions.

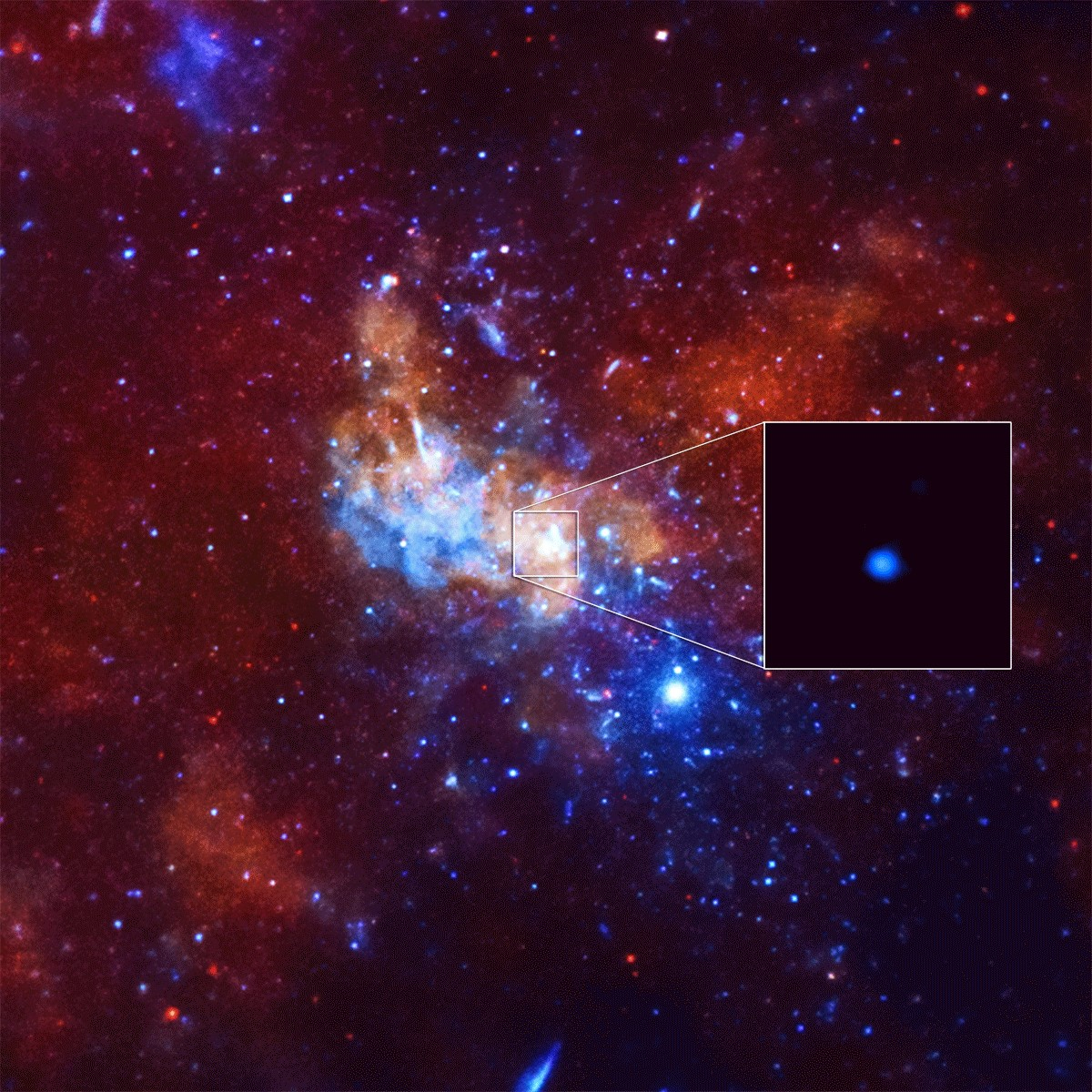
5 January: Detection of an unusually bright X-ray flare from Sagittarius A*, a supermassive black hole in the center of the Milky Way galaxy.

- 3 January – Iranian chemists from Ferdowsi University of Mashhad created biodiesel fuel from soya oil to decrease pollutions caused by fossil fuels.
- 5 January
  - Scientists from the US and UK have mapped the genome of the bowhead whale and identified genes responsible for its 200-year lifespan, the longest of any mammal.
  - The Japan Meteorological Agency (JMA) declares 2014 as the hottest year on record globally, surpassing the previous record of 1998.
  - Researchers have developed a compound that causes the metabolism of mice to respond as if a meal has been eaten, so they burn fat to make room for new calories. Human trials could follow within two years.
  - An earthquake felt by Ohio residents in March 2014 was caused by fracking, a study has found.
  - NASA reports observing an X-ray flare 400 times brighter than usual, a record-breaker, from the supermassive black hole, named Sagittarius A*, in the center of the Milky Way galaxy. The unusual event may have been caused by the breaking apart of an asteroid falling into the black hole or by the entanglement of magnetic field lines within gas flowing into Sagittarius A*.
- 6 January
  - Astronomers have developed a method of accurately telling a star's age from how fast it spins.
  - NASA announces the 1000th confirmed exoplanet discovered by the Kepler Space Telescope. Three of the newly confirmed exoplanets were found to orbit within habitable zones of their related stars: two of the three, Kepler-438b and Kepler-442b, are near-Earth-size and likely rocky; the third, Kepler-440b, is a super-Earth.
- 7 January
  - Humans are eroding soil a hundred times faster than natural processes, according to a new study.
  - If global warming is to be kept below 2 °C this century, then over 80% of coal, 50% of gas and 30% of oil reserves are "unburnable" a new study concludes.
  - A review article published in the journal Neuron describes a number of recent studies showing that brain imaging can help predict a person's future learning, criminality, health-related behaviors, and response to drug or behavioral treatments.
  - In a world first, researchers from New Zealand have observed mitochondrial DNA moving between cells in mice and triggering cancer growth.
  - Tarbiat Modarres University researchers produce ceramic nonporous membrane with high thermal firmness.
- 8 January
  - NASA reports determining, with a high degree of accuracy, the precise center of the planet Saturn and its family of moons – to within 4 km (2.5 mi).
  - Astronomers have observed and measured a neutron star slipping out of view because of the warp in space-time its orbit creates. The star is expected to reappear in about 160 years.
- 9 January
  - A new species of ichthyosaur resembling a dolphin merged with a crocodile has been discovered in Scotland. Dearcmhara shawcrossi lived in the early to mid-Jurassic about 170 million years ago.
  - Iranian and Argentinean researchers made a biosensor by using graphene sheets.
  - Iranian researchers from University of Tehran applied nanocomposite covering to enhance the strength and lifetime of concrete compositions.
- 13 January – The first lab-grown, contracting human muscle is announced by Duke University.
- 14 January
  - NASA and ESA celebrate 10 years since the Cassini-Huygens probe landed on Titan, largest moon of the planet Saturn. (related image).
  - By the year 2050, almost nobody under the age of 80 will die of cancer, according to a study by University College London.
  - The acceleration in global sea level rise during recent decades has been significantly underestimated, according to a new Harvard study.

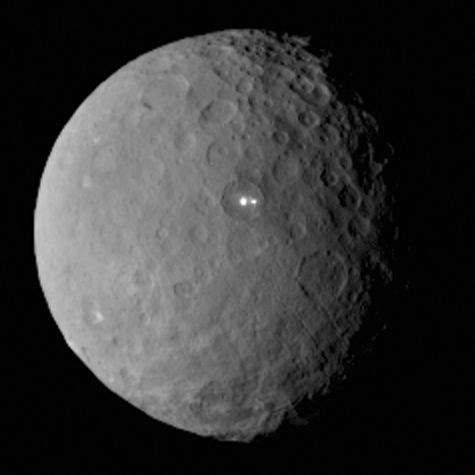
19 January: Ceres, a dwarf planet, as viewed by the Dawn spacecraft on 19 February 2015.

- 15 January
  - Researchers have extended the lifespan of fruit flies by 60 percent, using a method that could one day lead to anti-aging treatments for humans.
  - A series of 24 global indicators, published in the journal Anthropocene Review, show how the impact of humans is now the primary driver of the Earth system.
  - Iranian scientists from University of Tehran produced a sensor that calculates the amount of blood sugar of Diabetics by measuring acetone concentration in their expiration.
- 16 January
  - NASA reports the Beagle 2, built by the United Kingdom, thought to be lost on the planet Mars since 2003, has been found on the surface in Isidis Planitia (location is about 11.5265°N 90.4295°E) High-resolution images captured by the Mars Reconnaissance Orbiter identify the lost probe, which appears to be intact. (see discovery images here)
  - NASA and NOAA confirm that 2014 was the hottest year on record globally.
- 19 January
  - NASA presents an animated view of the dwarf planet Ceres by the approaching Dawn spacecraft. (animated images: 20150113 & 20150204)
  - By observing the gravitational effects on extreme trans-Neptunian objects (ETNOs), astronomers have theorised that a pair of Earth-sized objects may be hidden at the edge of the Solar System.
- 20 January – Long-term carbon sequestration as a way of mitigating climate change may be harder to achieve than previously thought, due to difficulties in converting the gas to a solid state, MIT reports.
- 22 January
  - By recreating the conditions on Earth during the Chicxulub impact, researchers have concluded that the heat pulse nearer the crater was too short-lived (less than a minute) to ignite significant amounts of plant matter. By contrast, regions much further away would have experienced less intense, but longer-lived heat levels (up to seven minutes), long enough to ignite plant matter. This challenges previous theories about global firestorms in the aftermath of the event.

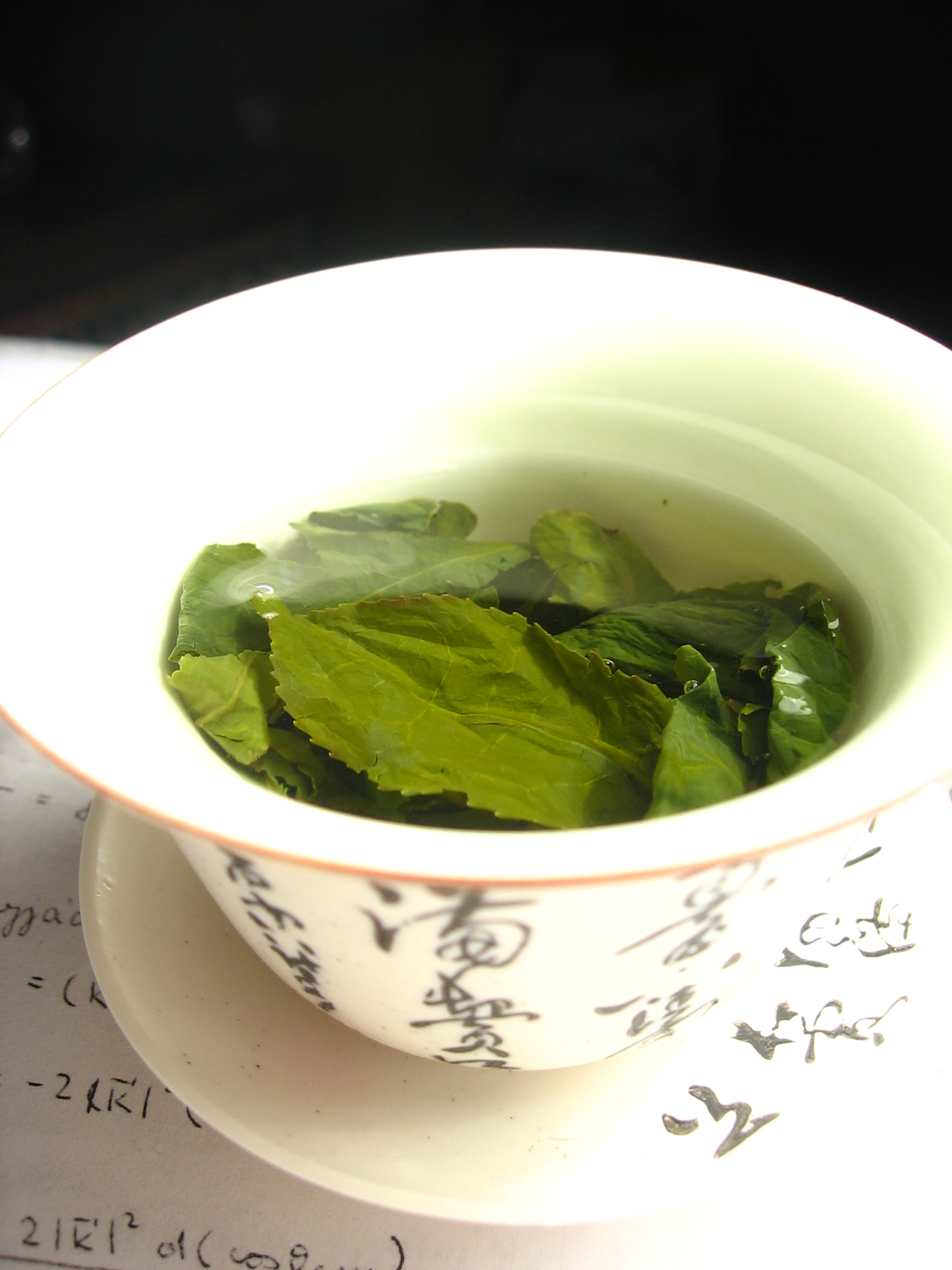
28 January: Ingredient in green tea found that may protect against oral cancer.

  - As part of the Open Worm Project, scientists have mapped the brain of a roundworm (C. elegans), created software to mimic its nervous system and uploaded it to a lego robot, which seeks food and avoids obstacles.
- 23 January
  - Scientists have slowed the speed of light by using a special mask to change the shape of photons.
  - With a successful new method, Iranian scientists managed to create a graphene-based gas sensor, which has uses in many industries to detect oxygen.
- 25 January – A new owl species in the Middle East, the desert tawny owl (Strix hadorami), is described.
- 26 January
  - Chemists determine that alkali metals explode on contact with water due to a Coulomb explosion at the water-metal interface driving the reaction, instead of merely due to Hydrogen gas formation and its subsequent ignition. This overturns what was previously considered to be a well understood phenomenon, and has the potential to increase safety when handling reactive metals.
  - Iranian nanotechnologists drafted and constructed solar cells for transforming solar energy into electricity.
- 27 January
  - Astronomers have discovered an exoplanet with a gigantic ring system that is 200 times larger than that around Saturn.
  - NASA reports that the Kepler space telescope confirmed five sub-Earth-sized rocky exoplanets, all smaller than the planet Venus (but bigger than the planet Mercury), in orbit around the 11.2 billion year old star Kepler-444, making this planetary system, at more than 80% of the age of the universe, the oldest yet discovered. According to NASA, no life as we know it could exist on these hot exoplanets, due to their close orbital distances to the host star.
- 28 January – An ingredient found in green tea may protect against oral cancer, according to Penn State University researchers.
- 29 January – Global warming will result in large storms becoming larger, rather than an increase in the number of storms, concludes a study by the University of Toronto.
- 30 January – A joint study of data from the Planck space mission and the ground-based experiment BICEP2 casts doubt on earlier findings of gravitational waves from the Big Bang.
- 31 January – NASA launches the Soil Moisture Active Passive (SMAP) observatory. It will provide the most accurate, highest-resolution global measurements of soil moisture ever obtained from space.

=== February ===
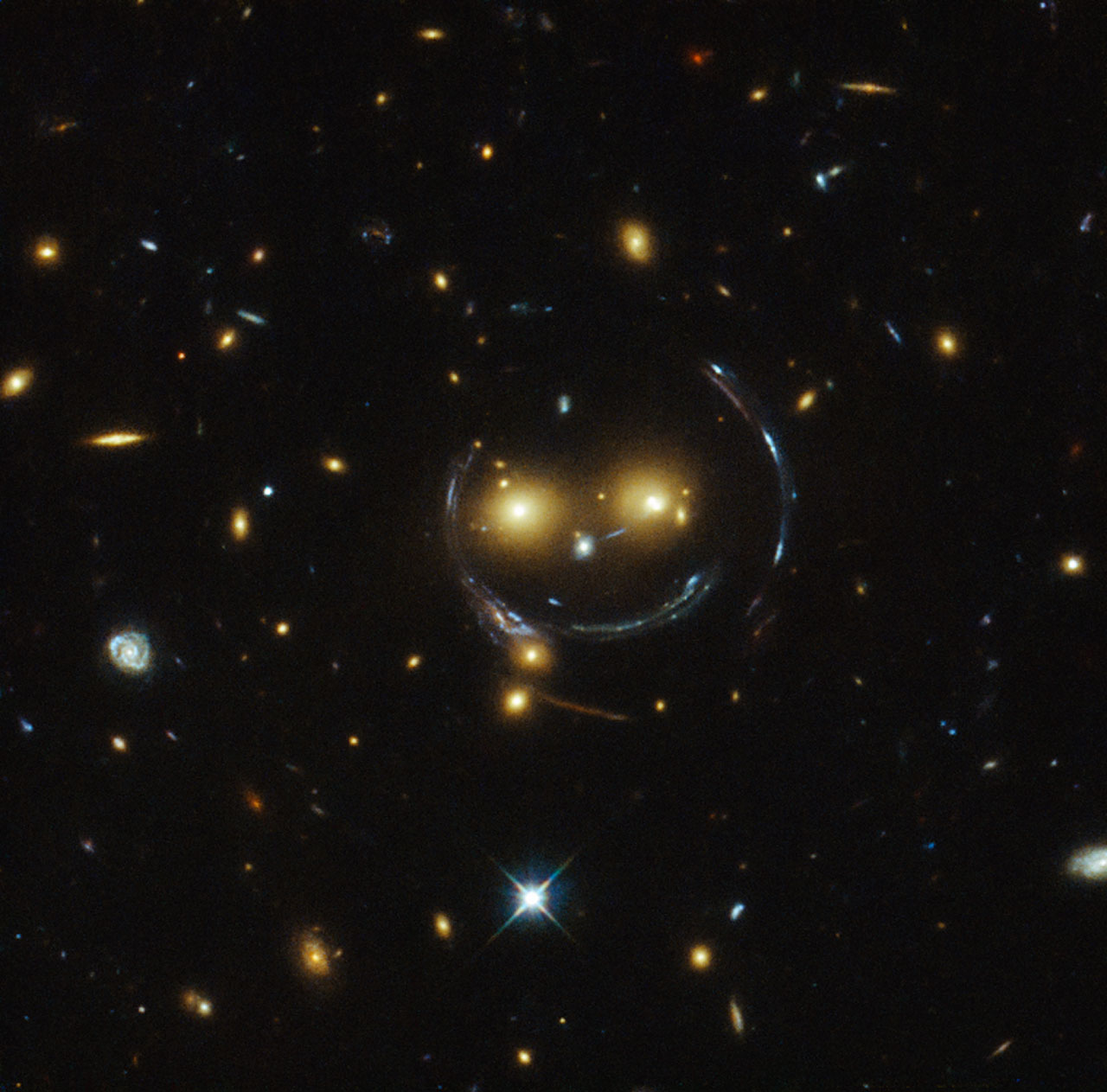
10 February: "Smiley" image of galaxy cluster (SDSS J1038+4849) and gravitational lensing (an Einstein ring) (HST).

- 2 February – A study about penta-graphene, a proposed carbon allotrope, is published.
- 3 February
  - The British government votes to allow a controversial new technique involving babies created from three people. If passed by the House of Lords, the UK will become the first country in the world to offer this medical procedure, which can be used to treat mitochondrial diseases.
  - For the first time, researchers have used biodegradable nanoparticles to kill brain cancer cells in animals and lengthen their survival.
  - The FDA approves a new drug, Ibrance (palbociclib), for treating advanced breast cancer.
  - The first transistors made from silicene, a one atom-thick version of silicon, are reported.
- 4 February
  - Scientists have genetically reprogrammed plants to be drought tolerant in response to an already existing agrochemical, circumventing the need for a new chemical that would otherwise have required many years of testing.
  - E-cigarettes cause many of the same harmful effects as normal cigarettes, according to a new study on mice.
- 5 February – The first generation of stars is now thought to have emerged 560 million years after the Big Bang, according to scientists working on the European Planck satellite. This is 140 million years later than the previous estimate of 420 million years.
- 6 February – Iranian nanotechnologists discovered key to measure species in liquids. In this study, the aim was to withdraw and measure vitamin B12 from liquid models.
- 9 February – Researchers have extracted isopropanol fuel from genetically engineered bacteria and solar-powered catalysts, achieving the same efficiency as photosynthesis.
- 10 February
  - NASA releases a "smiley" image of galaxy cluster (SDSS J1038+4849) and gravitational lensing (an Einstein ring) taken by the Hubble Space Telescope.
  - NASA scientists present the notion that comets are like "deep fried ice cream", since research studies suggest comet surfaces are formed of a mixture of organic compounds and dense crystalline ice, while comet interiors contain colder and less dense ice.
  - Iranian and Finnish researchers made a magnetic nanosorbent that adsorbs 60-100% of nitrate and nitrite in the sample of soil and water.
- 11 February
  - NASA's Deep Space Climate Observatory (DSCOVR) is launched by a SpaceX Falcon 9 rocket. It will measure solar winds and provide crucial early warnings during solar flares.
  - ESA's Intermediate eXperimental Vehicle (IXV) demonstrates a new atmospheric reentry technology, returning from space to Earth similar to the Space Shuttle but without wings.
  - A study in The New England Journal of Medicine reports that mortality due to cigarette smoking in the United States is substantially greater than previously thought.
  - Iranian experimenters from Sahand University of Technology and Islamic Azad University examined the effect of applying nanoparticles on rise oil extraction from supplies.
- 12 February – Researchers have calculated that between 4.8 and 12.7 million metric tons of plastic entered the ocean in 2010 from people living within 50 km of the coastline.
- 13 February – Scientists (including Geoffrey Marcy, Seth Shostak, Frank Drake, Elon Musk and David Brin) at a convention of the American Association for the Advancement of Science, discuss Active SETI and whether transmitting a message to possible intelligent extraterrestrials in the Cosmos is a good idea; one result was a statement, signed by many, that a "worldwide scientific, political and humanitarian discussion must occur before any message is sent".

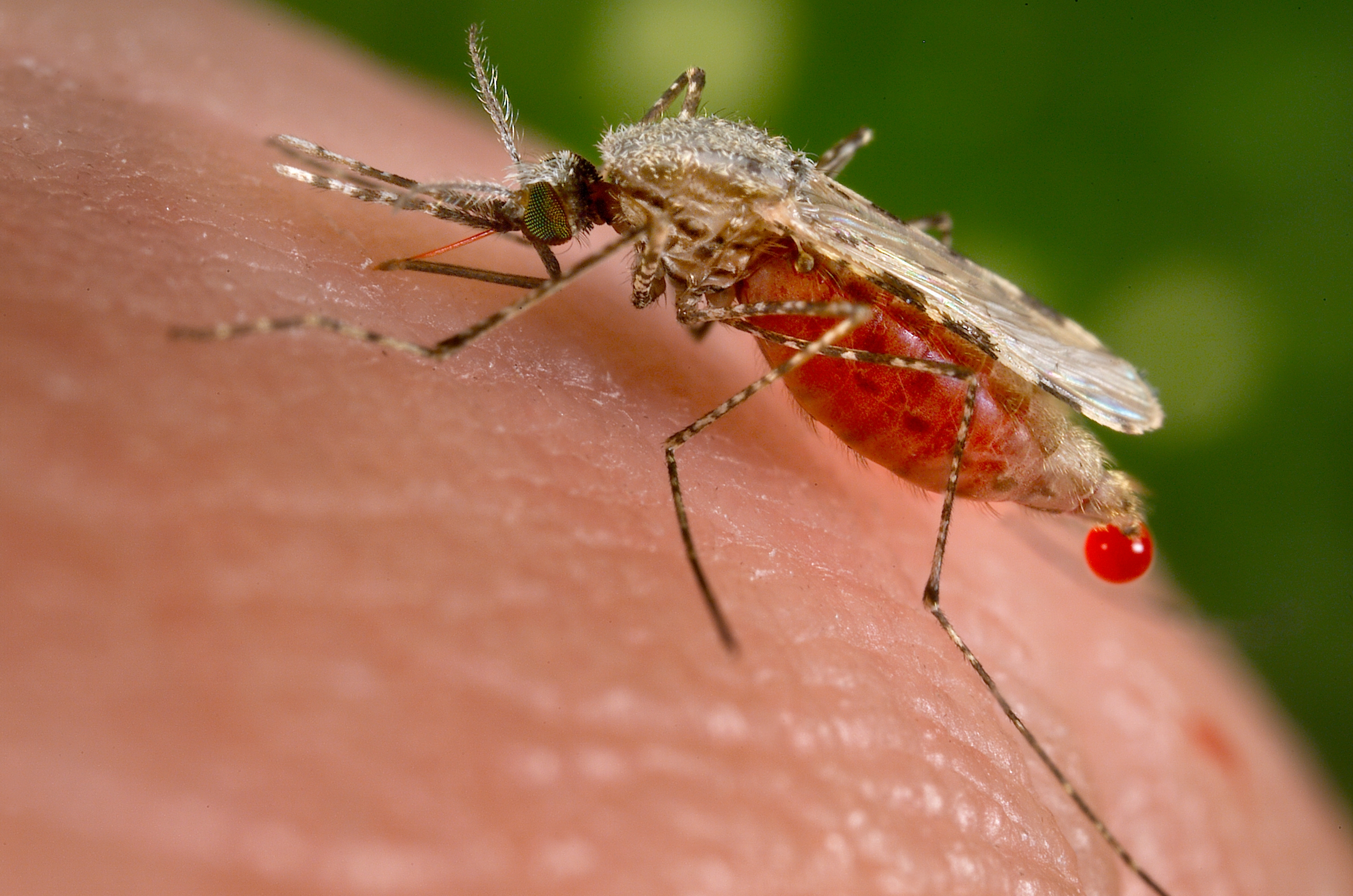
20 February: An Anopheles stephensi mosquito, a vector of malaria - mosquito control is an effective way of reducing its incidence.

- 16 February
  - New research by King's College London suggests the risk of psychosis is three times higher for users of potent "skunk-like" cannabis than for non-users.
  - Mars One selects its final 100 astronaut candidates.
  - Iranian scientists planned a new technique to cure of Wilson's disease. The study gave a modern nano-arrangement with more healing skill in cell culture form. The nanostructure consists of a bio well-matched polymeric nanocarrier that facilitates the penetration into the cell without making of toxicity with high effectiveness.
  - Iranian nanotechnologists synthesized the latest-scheme nano-pill of bio-adaptable and bio-degradable chain-molecular which is able to ebb toxicity of anti-cancer drugs. This modern medicine is considered for treating breast cancer.
- 18 February – Limpet teeth might be the strongest known natural material, a new study has found.
- 19 February
  - A regulator of gene activity known as HARE5 (human-accelerated regulatory enhancer) is found to make human brains bigger.
  - Iranian scientists achieved in devising of a biosensor to determine dopamine level, which has high detection border and go down clinical diagnosis expenses due to its high correctness and rate.
- 20 February – Drug-resistant malaria has been detected at the Myanmar-India border and now poses an "enormous threat" to global health, scientists have said.
- 26 February
  - The U.S. Federal Communications Commission (FCC) rules in favor of net neutrality by adopting Title II (common carrier) of the Communications Act of 1934 and Section 706 of the Telecommunications act of 1996 to the Internet. The FCC Chairman, Tom Wheeler, commented, "This is no more a plan to regulate the Internet than the First Amendment is a plan to regulate free speech. They both stand for the same concept."
  - Physicists present an alternative cosmological view to extend the Big Bang model, suggesting the Universe had no beginning or singularity and the age of the Universe is infinite.
- 27 February
  - A new study examining the role of oceanic cycles in heat transfer concludes that the global warming "pause" is only temporary and that temperatures will accelerate in the near future.
  - The number of wild giant pandas has increased by nearly 17% over the last decade, according to a new survey conducted by the Chinese government.

=== March ===
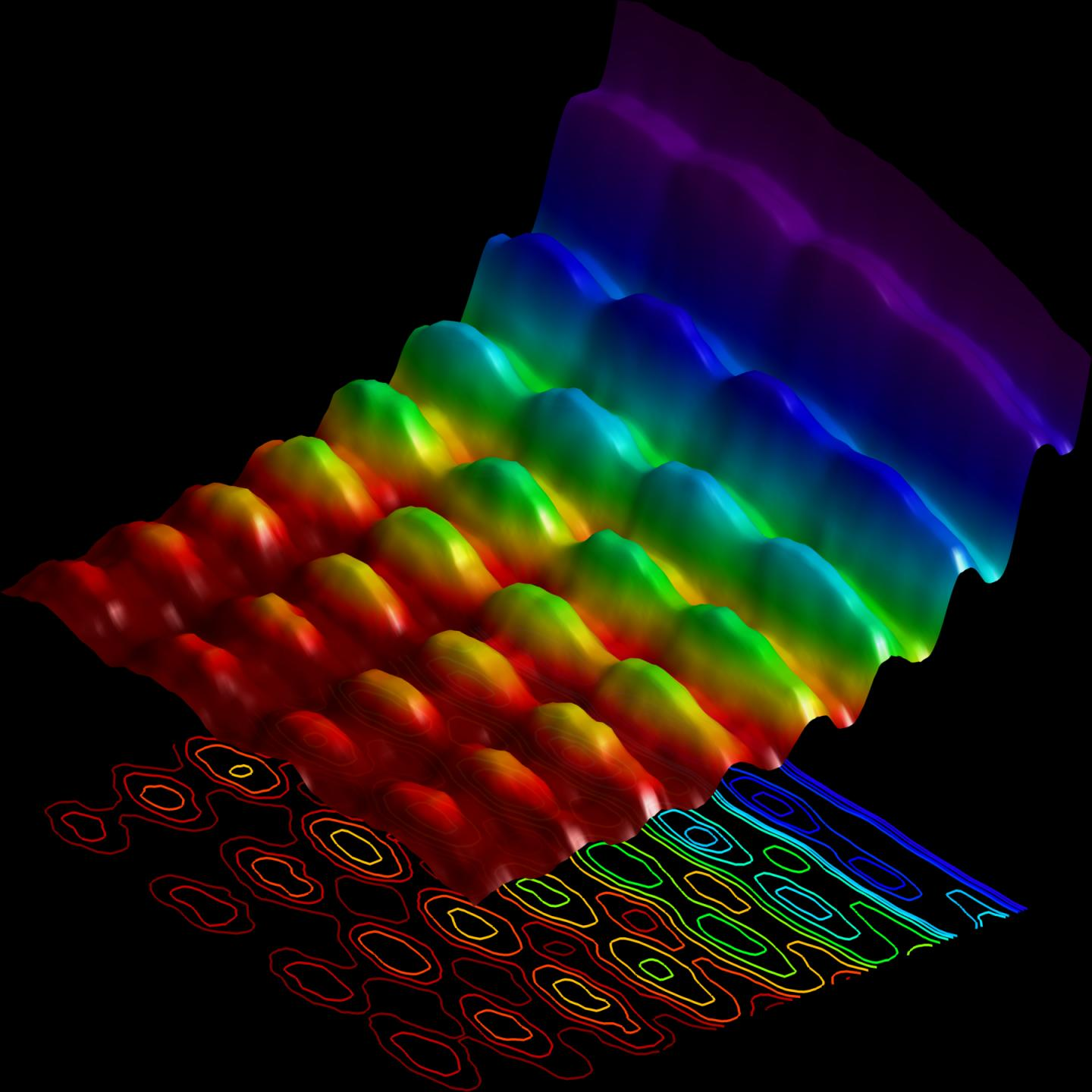
2 March: Light imaged as both a particle and a wave.

- 1 March – SanDisk announces the first 200GB capacity microSD card, a 56% increase on its previous record of 128GB just a year earlier.
- 2 March – Scientists have captured the first-ever image of light as both a particle and a wave.
- 3 March
  - The Food and Drug Administration (FDA) states that neither the benefits nor the safety of testosterone have been established for low testosterone levels due to aging and has required that testosterone pharmaceutical labels include warning information about the possibility of an increased risk of heart attacks and stroke.
  - NASA reports that, for the first time, complex DNA and RNA organic compounds of life, including uracil, cytosine and thymine, have been formed in the laboratory under outer space conditions, using starting chemicals, such as pyrimidine, found in meteorites. Pyrimidine, like polycyclic aromatic hydrocarbons (PAHs), the most carbon-rich chemical found in the Universe, may have been formed in red giants or in interstellar dust and gas clouds, according to the scientists.
- 4 March – A 2.8 million-year-old jawbone may be the oldest human fossil in existence, according to two papers published simultaneously in Science. Researchers now suspect that Homo (the genus that includes modern humans) dates back at least 400,000 years earlier than previously thought.
- 5 March
  - Evidence for a vast, ancient ocean that once covered most of the northern hemisphere on Mars is reported by NASA.
  - Astronomers have discovered the fastest known star, which is being ejected from the galaxy by a supernova explosion. Its hypervelocity of 1,200 km/s (2.7 million mph) is high enough to escape the gravitational pull of the Milky Way.
  - The number of people affected by river flooding could nearly triple by 2030, according to a new analysis.

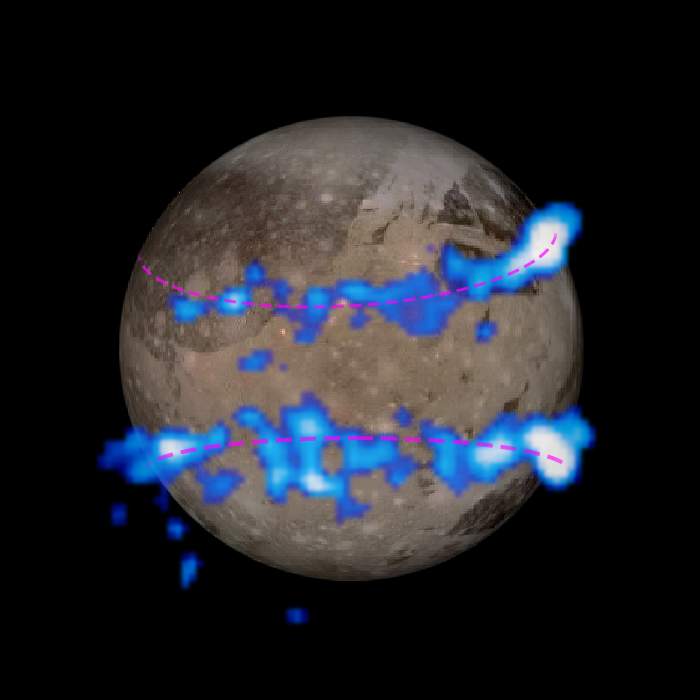
12 March: Aurorae on Ganymede, largest moon of planet Jupiter – auroral belt shifting may indicate a subsurface saline ocean.

- 6 March
  - A pioneering therapy using bone marrow stem cells to treat lung cancer patients is announced in the UK.
  - Archaeologists report finding two lost cities deep in the Honduras jungle, thought to be untouched by humans for at least 600 years.
  - The Dawn spacecraft begins to orbit Ceres, becoming the first spacecraft to visit a dwarf planet.
- 7 March – Iranian nanotechnologists created a modern sort of electrical insulator with elevated dielectric constant, this achievement is used in electronics, optoelectronics and electrochemical factories.
- 9 March
  - Solar Impulse begins its round-the-world flight, aiming to become the first plane to circumnavigate the globe using only energy from the Sun.
  - A new class of drugs known as "senolytics" has been shown to improve multiple aspects of aging in mice.
- 11 March
  - The rocket engine of NASA's Space Launch System, the most powerful booster ever built, has its first ground test, with officials claiming a "perfect" result.
  - NASA's Cassini spacecraft provides the first clear evidence of hydrothermal activity on Saturn's moon Enceladus, which may resemble that seen in the deep oceans on Earth and is likely the most habitable off-world environment ever found.
  - Photos emerge of a newly formed island near Tonga in the Pacific, created as a result of volcanic activity.
  - A breakthrough in carbon capture technology allows the process to be undertaken with half as much energy as previous methods.
- 12 March
  - A new method for treating Alzheimers with ultrasound has been demonstrated in mice, completely clearing the amyloid plaques in 75% of the animals.
  - Hubble Space Telescope's views of Ganymede's aurorae suggest the moon, Jupiter's largest, may contain a vast subsurface saline ocean.
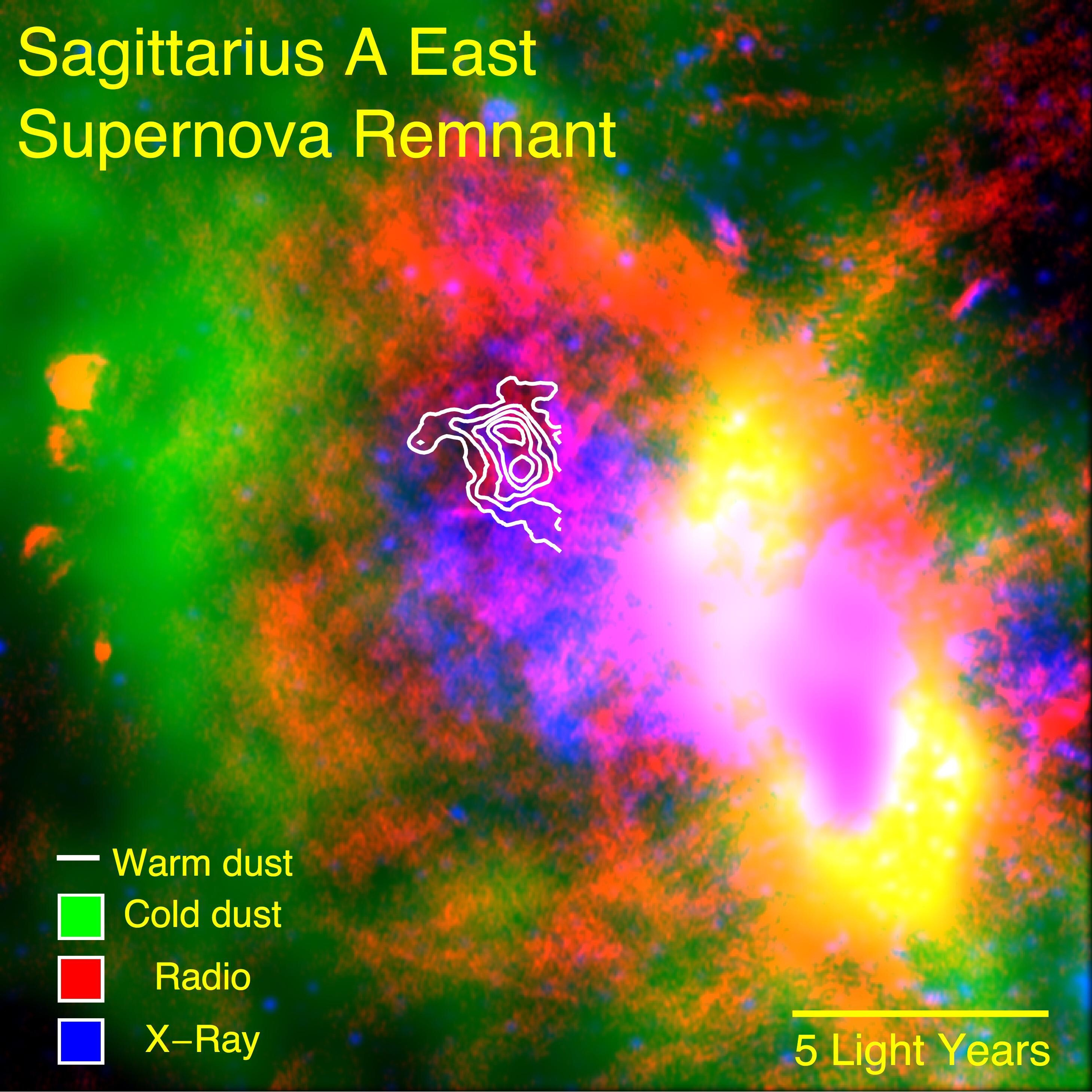
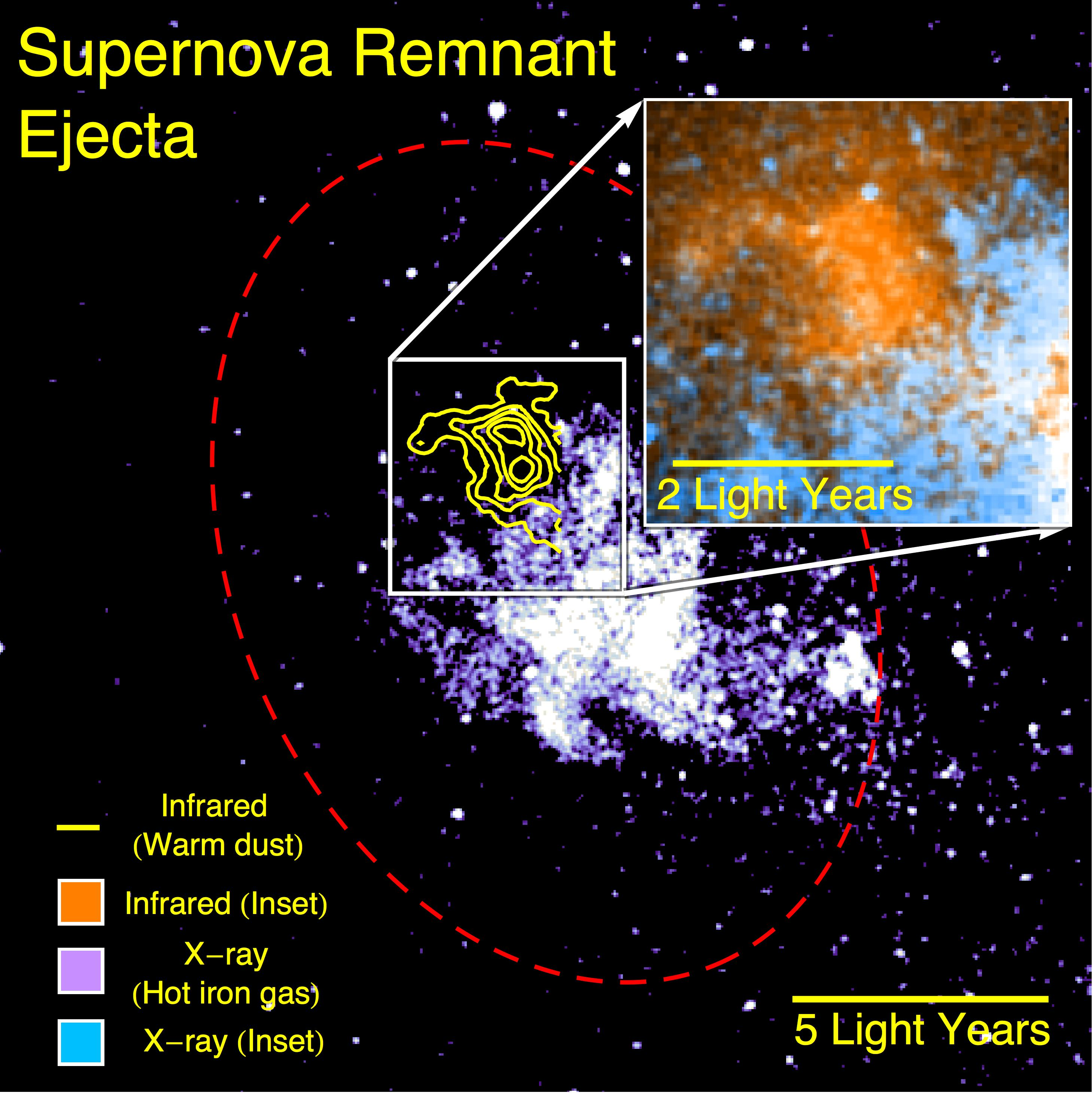
19 March: Supernova remnant ejecta producing planet-forming material.
  - The U.S. Federal Communications Commission releases the specific details of the net neutrality rules.
- 17 March – Lava tubes big enough to house entire cities could be structurally stable on the moon, according to a theoretical study presented at the Lunar and Planetary Science Conference.
- 18 March
  - NASA reports the detection of an aurora that is not fully understood and an unexplained dust cloud in the atmosphere of the planet Mars.
  - A 30-year land-based study of the Amazon, the most extensive ever conducted, shows the rainforest is gradually losing its ability to absorb carbon from the atmosphere, as trees die at faster and faster rates.
- 19 March
  - The National Snow and Ice Data Center reports that Arctic sea ice reached its lowest ever maximum extent.
  - Using data from SOFIA, it is discovered that planets may be formed from supernova remnant ejecta.
  - Scientists report on a genetic modification that can spread much quicker than conventional genetics would allow, copying itself to other chromosomes with CRISPRs. Possible applications include malaria-resistant mosquitos.
  - Scientists, including an inventor of CRISPR, urge a worldwide moratorium on using gene editing methods to genetically engineer the human genome in a way that can be inherited, writing "scientists should avoid even attempting, in lax jurisdictions, germline genome modification for clinical application in humans" until the full implications "are discussed among scientific and governmental organizations."
- 20 March – A total solar eclipse occurs, visible over much of Europe.
- 22 March – DNA from the extinct woolly mammoth is spliced into that of an elephant and shown to be functional for the first time.
- 24 March
  - NASA reports the first detection of nitrogen released after heating surface sediments on the planet Mars. The nitrogen, in the form of nitric oxide, was detected by the SAM instrument on the Curiosity rover and can be used by living organisms. The discovery supports the notion that ancient Mars may have been habitable for life.
  - The frog species Pristimantis mutabilis is described in the Zoological Journal of the Linnean Society.
  - A temperature of 17.5 °C (63.5 °F) is recorded in the Antarctic Peninsula, the highest ever seen on the continent. The region is "one of the fastest warming spots on Earth."
  - Iranian chemists modeled and resolved non-linear dynamic treatment and vulnerability of nanostructures in the presence of external driving factors.
- 25 March
  - A new technique has successfully entangled 3,000 atoms using only a single photon, the largest number of particles that have ever been mutually entangled experimentally.

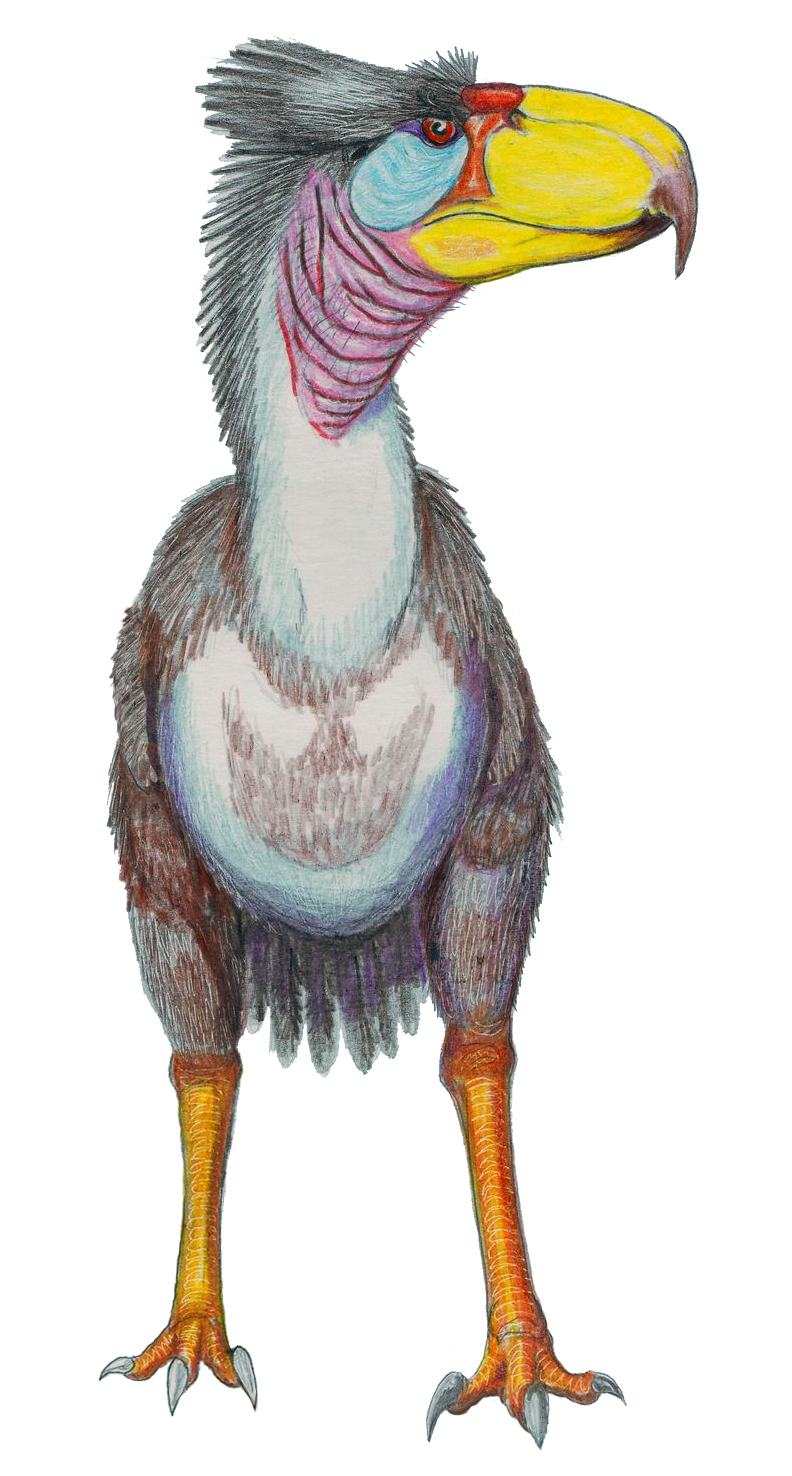
10 April: Artist's restoration of Titanis walleri, an extinct eight-foot tall carnivorous flightless bird also known as a "terror bird".

  - Iranian researchers reduce costly materials from diabetes diagnosis sensors. They devised and created a non-enzyme biosensor at the laboratorial scale to notice diabetes.
- 26 March
  - The ice around the edge of Antarctica is melting faster than previously thought, researchers have warned.
  - A nanoparticle therapy has been shown to accelerate the healing of wounds by 50 percent.
  - Autonomous sensory meridian response is described.
- 30 March
  - A 1,000-year-old treatment for eye infections – containing onion, garlic and part of a cow's stomach – has been shown to completely wipe out Staphylococcus aureus, the antibiotic-resistant superbug known as MRSA.
  - Eating pesticide-laden foods is linked to remarkably low sperm count (49% lower), say Harvard scientists in a landmark new study connecting pesticide residues in fruits and vegetables to reproductive health.
  - Scientists have developed tiny 'nanoneedles' that successfully prompted parts of mice bodies to generate new blood vessels. It is hoped this technique could ultimately help damaged organs and nerves to repair themselves and help transplanted organs to thrive.

=== April ===
- 1 April – New research reveals that, as the Arctic region warms and melts, polar bears forced ashore will be unable to gain sufficient food on land. Two-thirds of polar bears could be lost by 2050 and the species could be extinct by 2100.
- 2 April – Northwestern Medicine scientists identify a small RNA molecule called miR-182 that can suppress cancer-causing genes in mice with glioblastoma multiforme (GBM), a deadly and incurable type of brain tumor.
- 4 April – A total lunar eclipse occurs.
- 5 April – The Large Hadron Collider resumes operations after a two-year technology upgrade and various maintenance delays.
- 6 April – Glaciers in Western Canada will lose 70 percent of their volume by 2100, according to a study by the University of British Columbia.
- 7 April – Scientists from Iran research on a new method to let users to scan 3D photos with only their smartphone. The result was published in a media titled Nanophotonic coherent imager in the February 2015 issue of Optics Express.
- 8 April
  - DARPA announces a new project that aims to create a computer program able to continuously scan its environment, evolving and adapting autonomously for the next 100 years.
  - Complex organic molecules have been detected in a young star system for the first time.
  - Iranian researchers make magnetic recyclable photo-catalyst to refine dirty water.

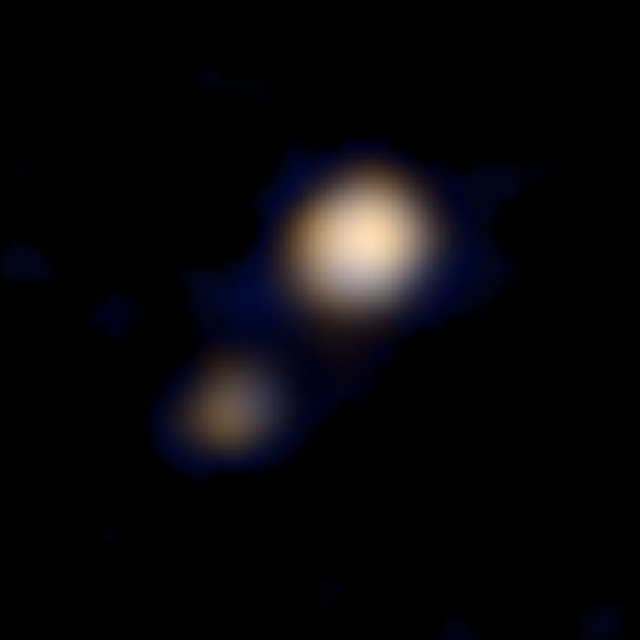
14 April: Pluto and moon Charon - first color image from the New Horizons spacecraft mission (Ralph camera; 9 April 2015).

- 9 April – Iranian researchers apply ultrasound waves to create Fullerene. This approach is in agreeing with green chemistry basics and it is biocompatible.
- 10 April – An almost completely intact skeleton of a terror bird is found in Argentina. Analysis suggests these predators had good low-frequency hearing and deep voices.
- 13 April – The U.S. Federal Communications Commission publishes the final rule on its new "Net Neutrality" regulations.
- 14 April
  - Stone tools found at Lomekwi 3 are dated to 3.3 million years ago, which, if confirmed, would represent the oldest known stone tools.
  - NASA releases the first color image of Pluto, a dwarf planet, and its moon Charon, taken by the New Horizons spacecraft. (image)
  - Scientists report, based on results from the Rosetta and Philae spacecraft, that the nucleus of comet 67P/Churyumov–Gerasimenko has no magnetic field, which suggests that magnetism may not have played a role in the early formation of planetesimals.
  - A search for possible heat signatures of advanced extraterrestrial civilisations reveals it has found "nothing obvious" in 100,000 galaxies.
  - Iranian scientists assess the dynamic effect in connecting two carbon nanotubes.
- 15 April
  - Following groundbreaking studies on mice, American scientists claim to have found a potential cause of Alzheimer's disease in the behaviour of immune cells, which it may be possible to target with drug treatments.
  - Researchers uncover evidence of a cannibalistic ritual that occurred in a British cave roughly 14,700 years ago.
- 16 April
  - A major advance in artificial photosynthesis is achieved with a system able to capture CO_{2} using solar energy and then use it to produce valuable chemical products.
  - Modification of histones in the DNA of nematodes, fruit flies, and possibly humans can affect aging, researchers claim.
  - Scientists say the first detailed kinematic study of octopus arm coordination in crawling show that the animals have a special system control tactic to fix their odd form.
  - Iranian researchers have produced a type of nanocatalyst which improves the performance of fuel cells.
- 17 April – Bouvier's red colobus, a species of monkey last seen in the 1970s and thought to have been extinct, is rediscovered in the Republic of Congo.
- 20 April – Japan announces plans to send an uncrewed lunar rover to the Moon's surface in 2018.
- 21 April
  - The Japanese L0 Series maglev becomes the first train to operate at a speed of 600 kilometres per hour (370 mph).
  - Researchers demonstrate WiFiFO (WiFi Free space Optic), a technology capable of increasing the bandwidth of WiFi systems tenfold, using optical data transmission via LED lights.

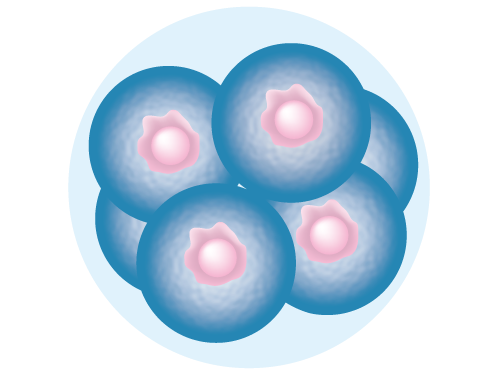
22 April: It is confirmed that Chinese scientists have genetically modified human embryos.

- 22 April
  - Astronomers have made the first-ever direct detection of the spectrum of visible light reflected off an exoplanet.
  - Researchers in China publish results of basic research using CRISPR to edit genes in non-viable human embryos.
- 23 April
  - Two huge magma chambers have been imaged in 3D below Yellowstone National Park.
  - For the first time, signals relating to the constant ringing noise of tinnitus have been mapped across the brain of a patient undergoing surgery.
  - An international team of scientists has sequenced the complete genome of the woolly mammoth.
  - Researchers at the University of Toronto in Canada have developed a new algorithm for showing protein structures in 3D, based on 2D images, which is 100,000 times faster than current methods.
  - A new gene-editing technique is reported that could prevent mitochondrial diseases, without the need for three-parent IVF.
- 27 April – Archaeologists discover fossil remnants of an ancient human species, dating from roughly 430,000 years ago, in two sites in Italy.
- 28 April
  - A study from Arizona State University reveals the action of an experimental blood pressure drug in unprecedented detail, potentially aiding the development of new and better drugs.
  - British and American psychologists claimed persecuting in schooldays result to at least mental health difficulties in adulthood.

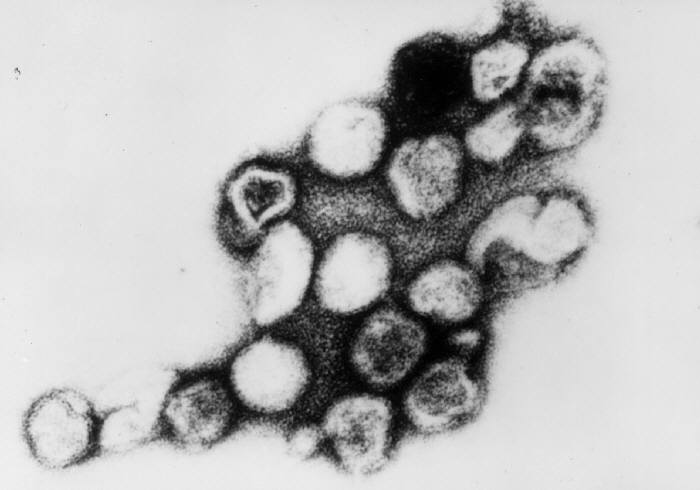
29 April: The World Health Organization (WHO) declares that rubella has been eradicated from the Americas.

- 29 April
  - Scientists report finding a scansoriopterygid dinosaur, named Yi qi ("strange wing"), that may have flown without feathers.
  - The World Health Organization (WHO) declares that rubella has been eradicated from the Americas.
  - Two critical steps towards a practical quantum computer are achieved by IBM scientists, who demonstrate the ability to detect and measure both kinds of quantum errors simultaneously, as well as building a new, square quantum bit circuit design that is the only physical architecture that could successfully scale to larger dimensions.
- 30 April
  - NASA's MESSENGER spacecraft concludes its four-year orbital mission over Mercury by crashing into the planet at a velocity of approximately 14,080 km/h (8,750 mph), impacting at 54.4° N, 149.9° W, near the crater Janáček.
  - Tesla Motors reveals a new large-scale battery technology for homes and businesses, which will provide a means of storing energy from localised renewables and a reliable backup system during power outages.
  - Progeria researchers have shown how the disorganisation of DNA contributes to the cell disorder and is linked to aspects of aging.

=== May ===
- 3 May – Astronomers report detection of a most distant galaxy, EGS-zs8-1, with an estimated distance of 13.1 billion light-years.
- 5 May
  - Researchers develop a centimetre-accurate GPS-based positioning system that could revolutionise geolocation on VR headsets, cellphones, drones and other technologies.
  - Vehicle manufacturer Daimler announces that its Freightliner Inspiration Truck has become the world's first autonomous truck to be granted a license for road use in the state of Nevada.
  - Archaeornithura meemannae, a new species of prehistoric bird that represents the oldest known member of the modern bird lineage, is discovered.

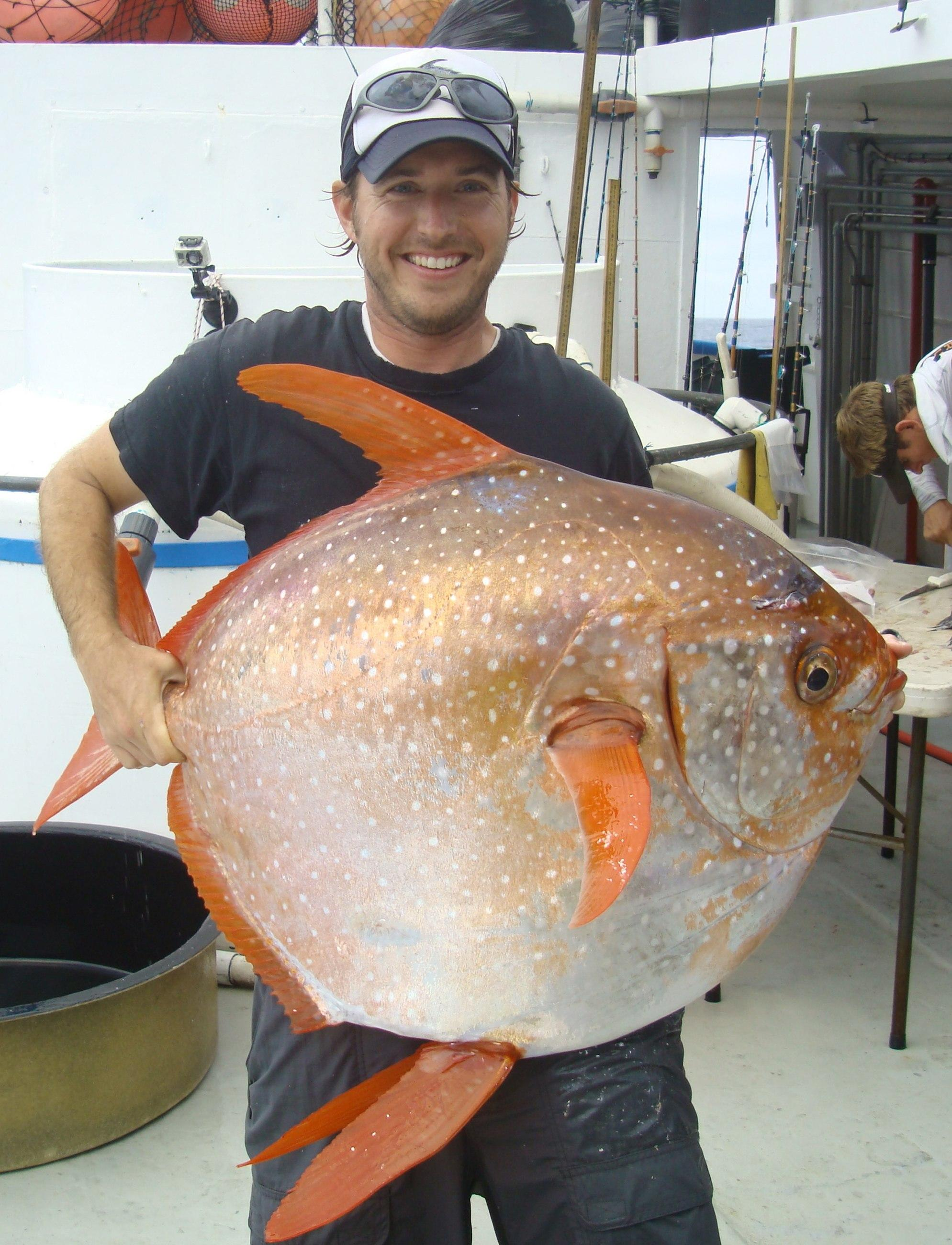
15 May: The Opah is confirmed as the first known warm-blooded fish.

- 6 May
  - Atmospheric CO_{2} remained above 400 parts per million (ppm) throughout March 2015, the first time it has been at this level for an entire month, according to NOAA. The current concentration of greenhouse gases is the highest it has been for millions of years.
  - Scientists announce a 2020 uncrewed mission, named "Hope", to the planet Mars by the United Arab Emirates, to study the Martian atmosphere and climate.
  - A 3-D technology known as tomosynthesis is shown to detect 40 percent more breast cancers than mammography, while lowering the radiation dose.
  - Scientists announce discovery of Lokiarchaeota, which is a transitional form between Archaea and Eukaryotes.
- 12 May
  - The Australian Government's Bureau of Meteorology confirms that the tropical Pacific is in the early stages of an El Niño that is "likely to persist in the coming months."
  - New evidence has been uncovered that global warming will damage wheat yields, resulting in a 15 percent loss when average temperatures increase by 2 degrees Celsius and a 40 percent decline when average temperatures rise by 4 degrees.
- 13 May – For the first time, the phase brightness variations in exoplanets have been measured to see the day-night cycle of exoplanetary weather dynamics.
- 14 May – Researchers confirm that strong warming is taking place in the upper troposphere, a phenomenon long predicted in global warming theory and climate models.
- 15 May
  - Larsen B and C, a pair of ice shelves in the Antarctic, are reportedly at risk of collapse in the near future, potentially adding several centimetres to global sea levels.
  - Researchers have taken a step towards large-scale fabrication of graphene, using chemical vapor deposition to produce composites containing 2-inch-by-2-inch sheets of the material.
  - The opah is confirmed as the first known "warm-blooded" fish, able to regulate the temperature of its entire body.

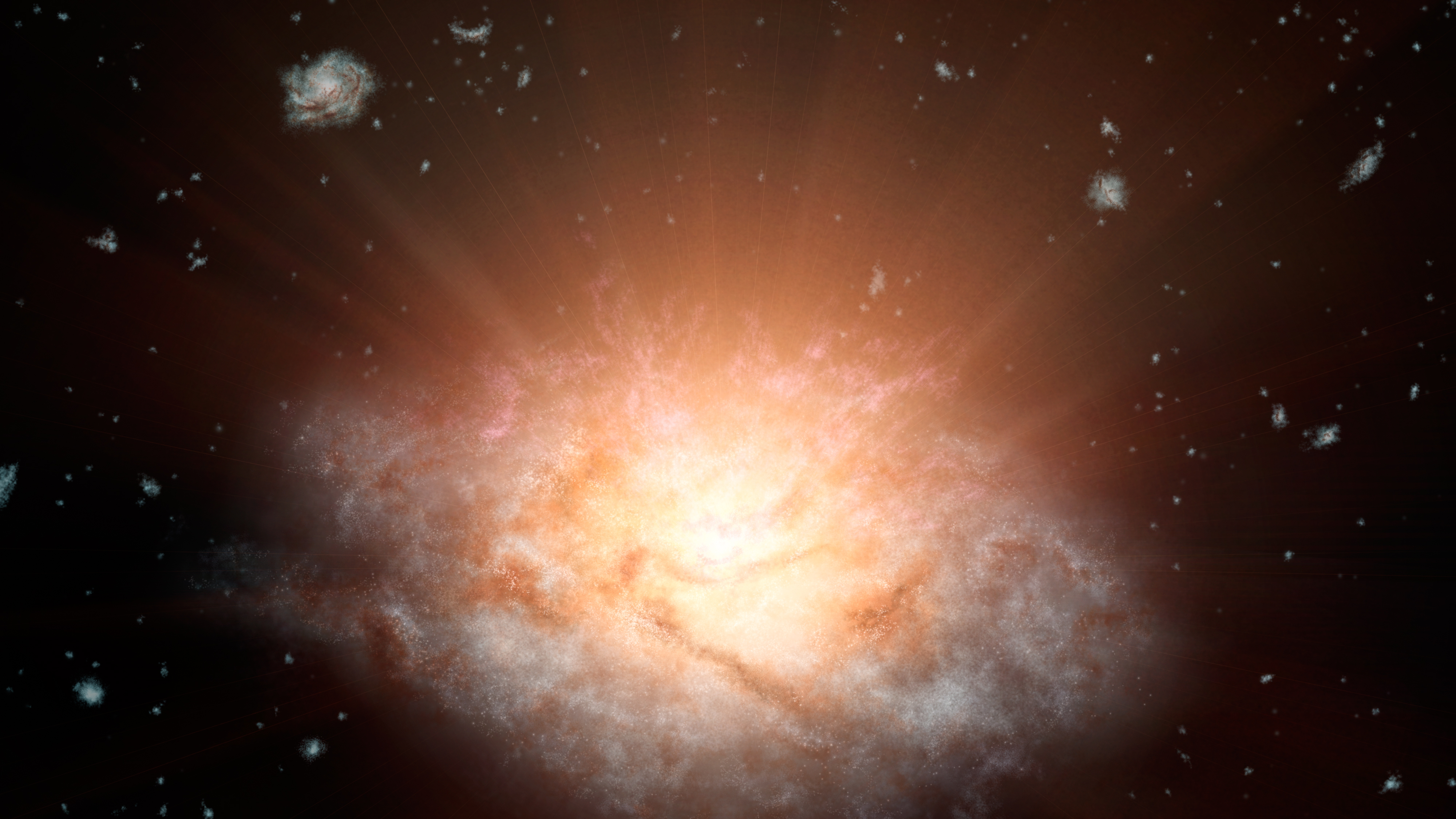
21 May: NASA reports that WISE J224607.57-052635.0 is the most luminous galaxy in the Universe. (artist's impression)

- 18 May – Scientists have reactivated neuroplasticity in older mice, restoring their brains to a more youthful state.
- 19 May – Playing natural sounds such as flowing water in offices can boost worker moods and improve cognitive abilities, in addition to providing speech privacy, according to a new study.
- 20 May – NASA reports the Kepler space observatory observed KSN 2011b, a Type Ia supernova in the process of exploding: before, during and after. Details of the pre-nova moments may help scientists better understand dark energy.
- 21 May
  - NASA reports the most luminous galaxy yet discovered is galaxy WISE J224607.57-052635.0. Smaller than the Milky Way galaxy, this dusty galaxy releases 10,000 times more energy. Nearly 100 percent of the light emitted from galaxy WISE J224607.57-052635.0 is infrared radiation. (image)
  - Scientists have observed a sudden increase of ice loss in a previously stable region of Antarctica. The ice loss is so large that it causes small changes in the gravity field of the Earth.
- 22 May – Researchers have developed algorithms that enable robots to learn motor tasks through trial and error using a process that more closely approximates the way humans learn, marking a major milestone in the field of artificial intelligence.

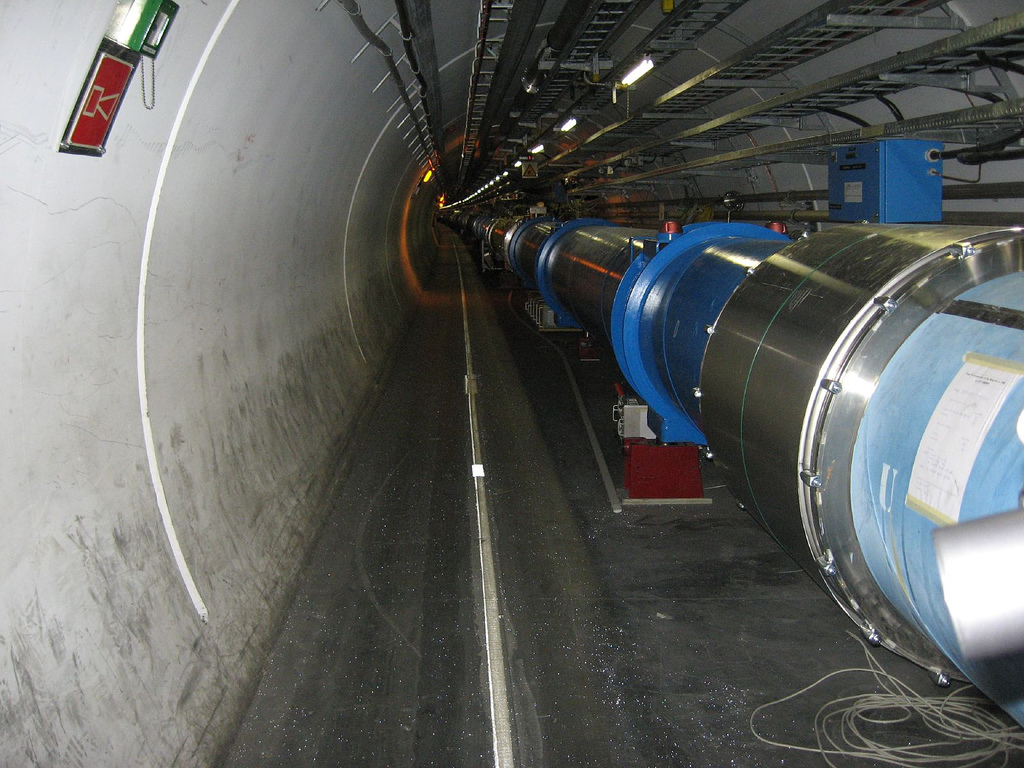
3 June: Reactivation of the Large Hadron Collider (LHC).

- 25 May – A new technique to create a single-molecule diode has been developed by scientists, and, in doing so, they have developed molecular diodes that perform 50 times better than all prior designs.
- 27 May – Glacier volume in the Everest region of the Himalayas could be reduced between 70% and 99% by 2100, unless greenhouse gas emissions are curbed, according to a new study by the European Geosciences Union.
- 28 May – A new species of ancient hominid – Australopithecus deyiremeda – is uncovered in Ethiopia, with jaw bones and teeth dating to between 3.3m and 3.5m years old.
- 29 May
  - Researchers have developed a new shape-memory material that stays strong even after tens of millions of transformations.
  - A new version of the Cheetah robot has been demonstrated with the ability to jump over obstacles while running.
- 30 May – A new treatment for lung cancer using a drug called nivolumab has been shown to more than double life expectancy in some patients.

=== June ===
- 1 June – A new study has linked rapid Arctic ice loss to extreme weather changes in Europe and the US.

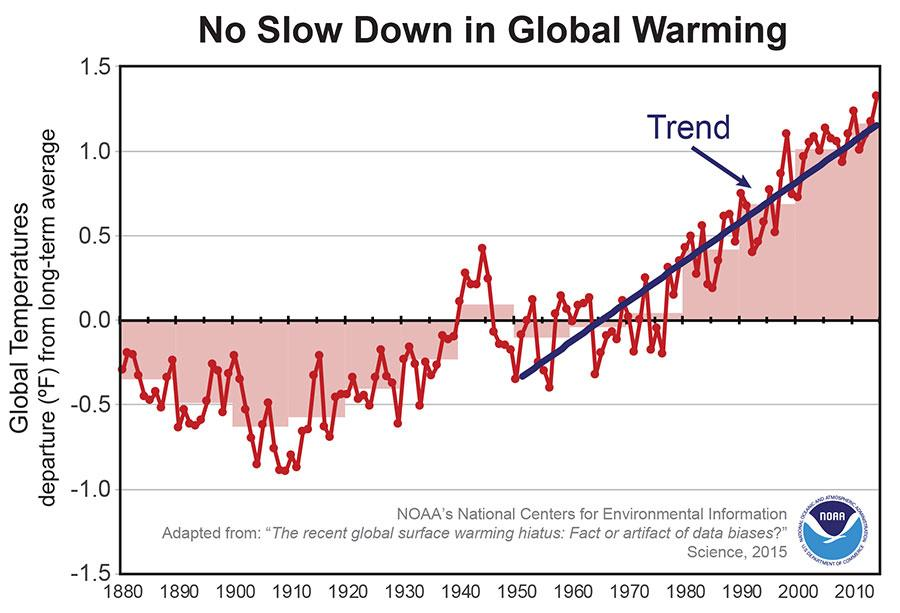
4 June: New temperature data suggests that global warming has not slowed.

- 2 June
  - NASA reports that the ALICE spectrograph on the Rosetta space probe studying comet 67P/Churyumov–Gerasimenko (67P) determined that electrons (within 1 km (0.62 mi) above the comet nucleus) produced from photoionization of water molecules by solar radiation, and not photons from the Sun as thought earlier, are responsible for the degradation of water and carbon dioxide molecules released from the comet nucleus into its coma.
  - Researchers have discovered a key protein required to maintain muscle mass and muscle strength during aging.
  - For the first time, researchers have created a lab-grown limb of a rat.
  - California-based Tri Alpha Energy has shown a 10-fold improvement in its ability to contain the hot particles needed for fusion.
- 3 June
  - The Large Hadron Collider is reactivated after a two-year pause, during which upgrades and repairs were taking place. The machine is now able to experiment with higher energies, increasing from 8 to 13 trillion electron volts (TeV).
- 4 June
  - Using new global surface temperature data, scientists at NOAA have shown that the rate of global warming in the last 15 years has not slowed, eliminating the "hiatus".
  - For the first time, a computer intelligence without direct human help has produced a model of regeneration.
  - Warming ocean temperatures and decreasing oxygen levels will significantly shift marine habitats in the future, according to a study by the University of Washington.
  - Researchers have achieved a significant breakthrough in combating antibiotic resistance using phages.

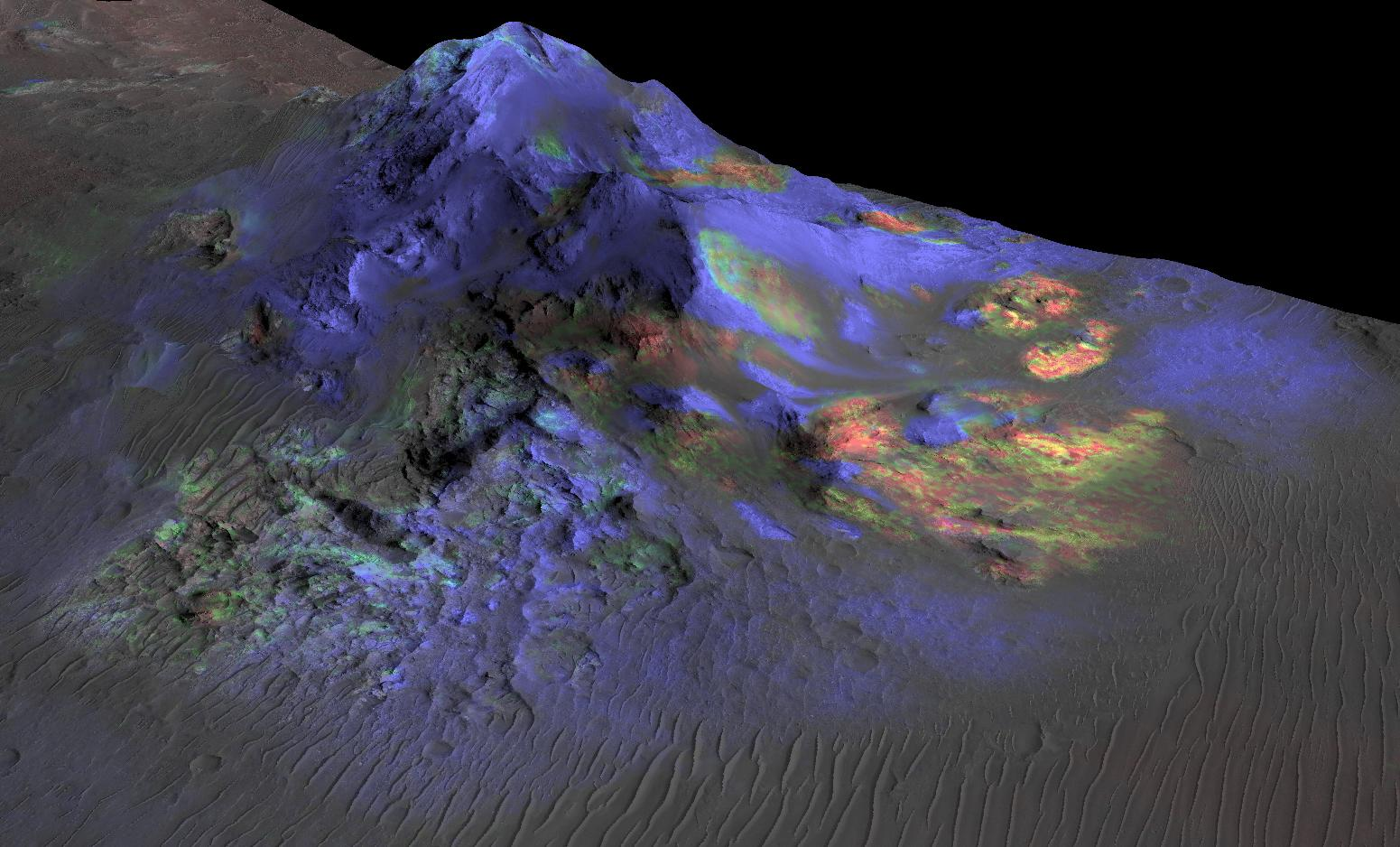
8 June: Alga crater on Mars - detection of impact glass deposit - possible site for preserved ancient life.

- 8 June
  - NASA reports that impact glass has been detected on the planet Mars - such material may contain preserved signs of ancient life. (related image)
  - May 2015 was the wettest month on record for the contiguous U.S. according to NOAA.
  - Engineers at Stanford University have developed a state-by-state plan to convert the U.S. to 100% clean, renewable energy by 2050.
- 9 June – Researchers have discovered what appear to be the remnants of red blood cells and connective tissue in 75 million-year-old dinosaur fossils.
- 10 June – A woman in Belgium is the first in the world to give birth to a baby using transplanted ovarian tissue frozen when she was still a child, doctors say.
- 14 June – News reports announce that the Philae lander, part of the Rosetta space mission, on the comet 67P/Churyumov–Gerasimenko, has woken up from hibernation and is communicating with Earth.
- 15 June
  - Researchers have sequenced and assembled the first full genome of a living organism using technology the size of smartphone.
  - A study published in the British Medical Journal finds that consuming up to 100g of chocolate every day is linked to lowered heart disease and stroke risk.

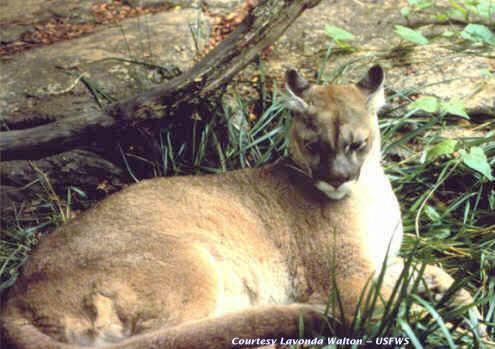
16 June: The eastern cougar is declared extinct.

- 16 June – The eastern cougar is declared extinct by the U.S. Fish and Wildlife Service.
- 17 June
  - Astronomers report evidence, for the first time, of the existence of the very early stars that may have provided the chemical elements needed for the later formation of planets and life as we know it. These very old population III stars are postulated to have been formed after the Big Bang, when the Universe was about 800 million years old, and may have been detected in galaxy Cosmos Redshift 7 (CR7), about 12.9 billion light-years from Earth.
  - The world's thinnest light source is created using graphene.
- 18 June – By reactivating a single gene, colorectal cancer cells in mice stop growing and re-establish normal intestinal function within four days, according to a study published in the journal Cell.
- 19 June – A major study confirms that Earth is currently witnessing the start of a mass extinction event the likes of which have not been seen for at least 65 million years. It is being precipitated by human actions over the past 500 years.
- 20 June – A titanium 3D-printed prosthetic jaw is successfully implanted in a male patient by surgeons in Melbourne, Australia.
- 23 June – The Sentinel-2A Earth observation satellite is launched.
- 24 June
  - Astronomers report the discovery of a brand new type of planet, resembling a giant comet. GJ 436b is a "warm Neptune" located 33 light years from Earth and features a huge cloud of gas trailing away from its parent red dwarf star.
  - Researchers identify a protein on tiny particles, GPC1+ crExos, released by pancreatic cancer cells, which may help in detecting the illness at its earliest stage.

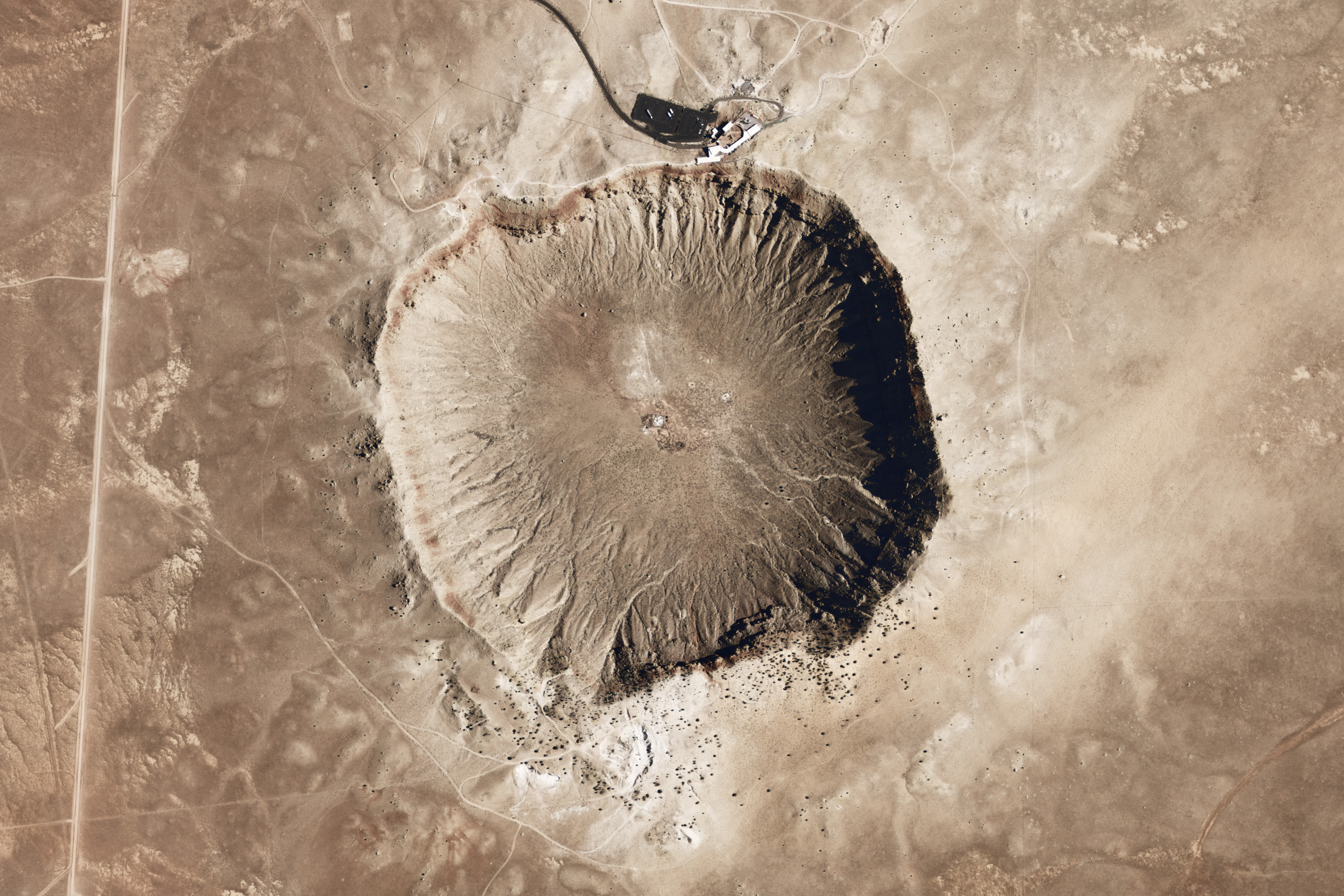
26 June: All large impact craters on Earth have been identified.

- 25 June
  - A new compound, MM41, is shown to reduce pancreatic cancer tumours by 80 percent in mice.
  - Google demonstrates a new AI chatbot that is able to "remember facts, understand contexts and perform common sense reasoning, all with fewer hand-crafted rules."
- 26 June – All of the biggest impact craters on Earth have now been identified, with none left to be found at 6 km (3.7 mi) or greater width, according to a study by geophysicists.
- 27 June – SpaceX CRS-7, a cargo resupply mission to the International Space Station, explodes shortly after launch.
- 29 June – The dwarf planet Pluto passes between a distant star and the Earth producing a shadow on the Earth near New Zealand that allows SOFIA, an airborne observatory, to study the atmosphere of Pluto.
- 30 June – A new model created by mathematicians and physicists suggests a "Big Rip" end to the universe.

=== July ===
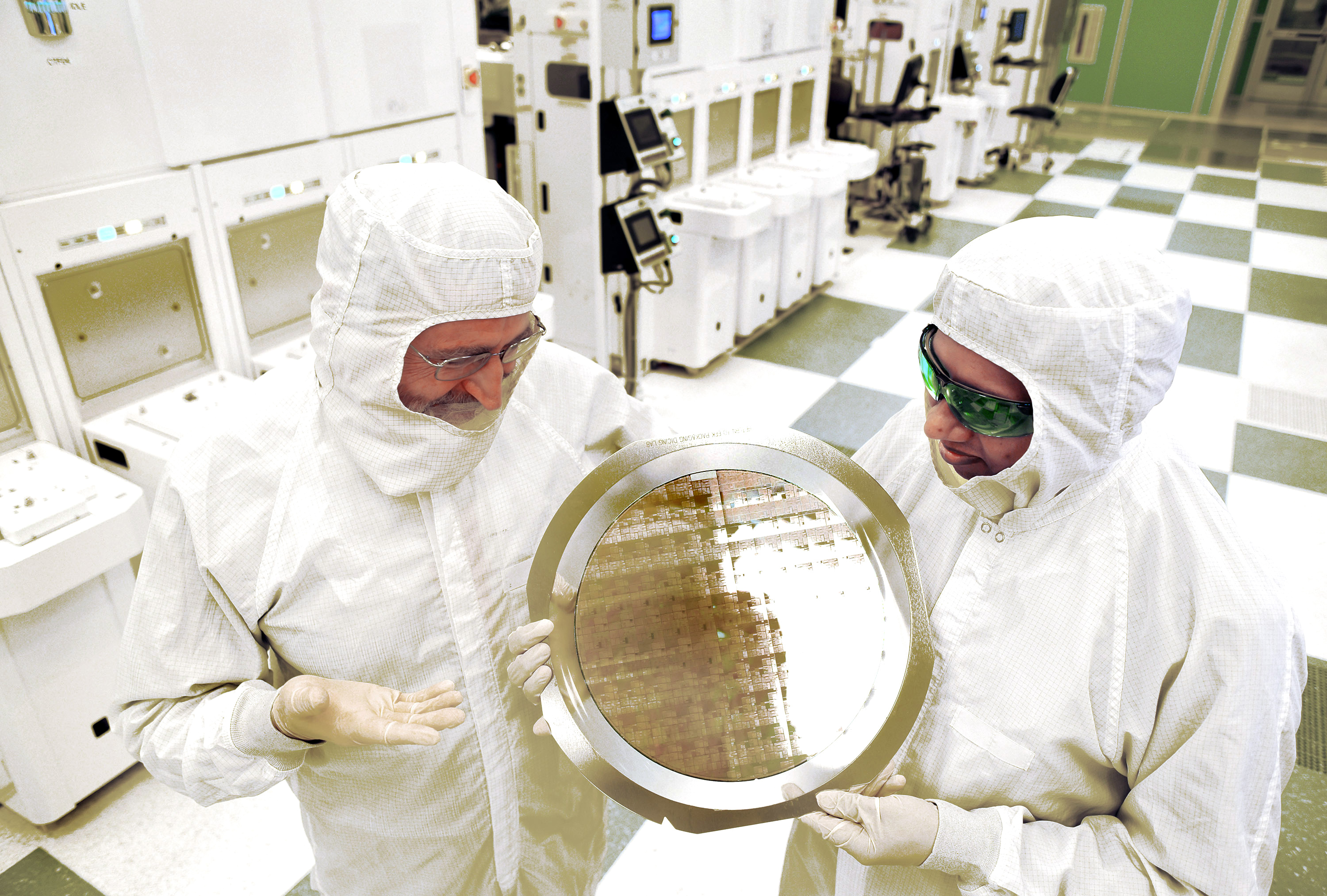
9 July: Researchers led by IBM shrink transistors in computer chips to the 7nm scale.

- 2 July
  - Scientists report that active pits, related to sinkhole collapses and possibly associated with outbursts, have been found on the comet 67P/Churyumov–Gerasimenko by the Rosetta space probe.
  - The first comprehensive analysis of the mammoth genome is completed, revealing a number of traits that enabled the animals to survive in the Arctic cold.
- 8 July
  - Astronomers report the discovery of an extremely rare five-star system.
  - Scientists announce a project, as part of the Global Genome Initiative, to sample and freeze DNA from half of the world's plant species within two years.
- 9 July
  - The FDA toughens warnings of increased heart attack and stroke risk associated with pain relievers containing ibuprofen, like Advil, Aleve, Motrin and related nonsteroidal anti-inflammatory drugs (NSAID). Tylenol, containing acetaminophen, is not an NSAID and is not affected by the new warnings. However, Aspirin is an NSAID but is not affected by the new warnings.
  - IBM announces a breakthrough in the manufacture of 7 nm computer chips that will enable the trend of Moore's Law to continue for the next few years.

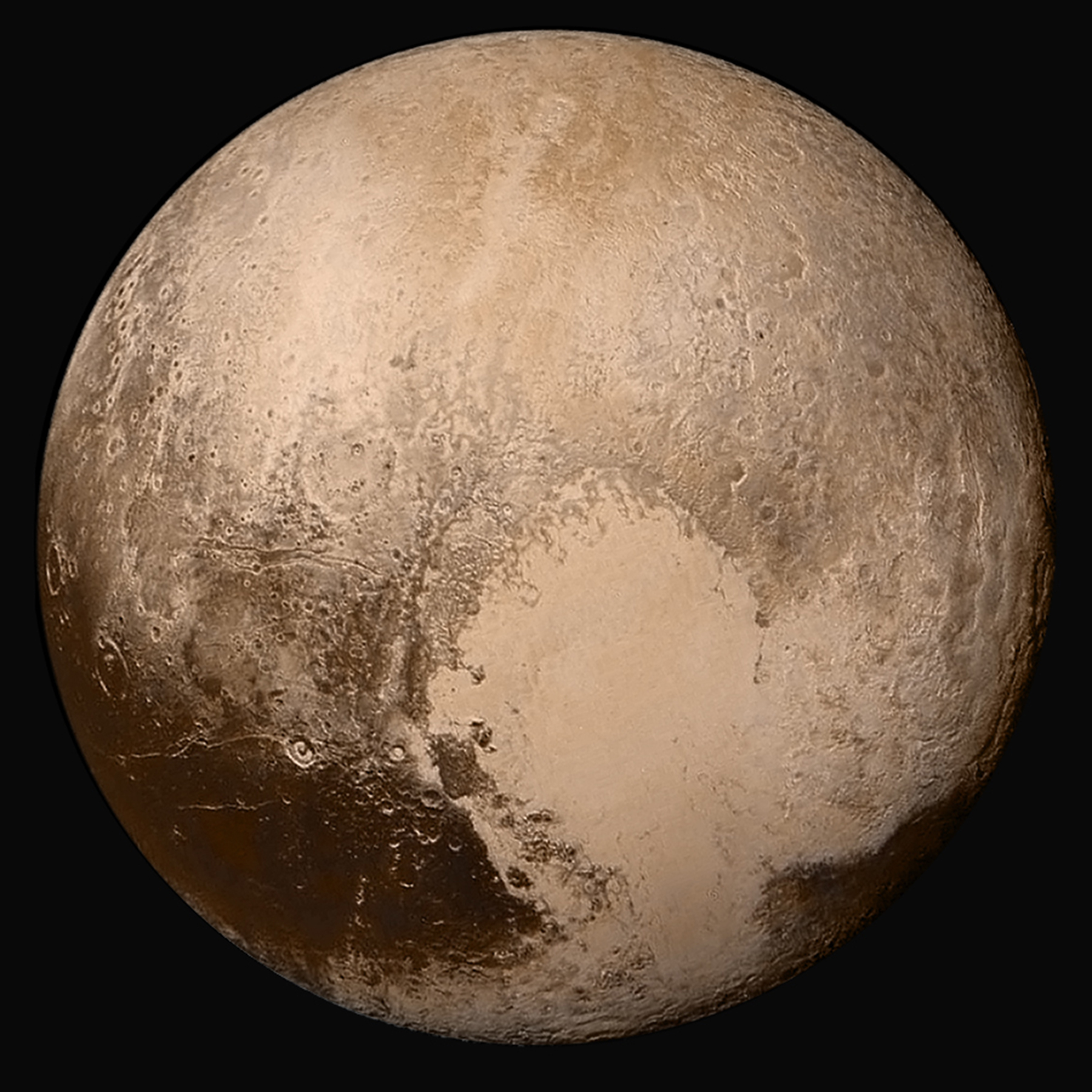
14 July: Pluto, dwarf planet, as viewed by the New Horizons spacecraft just before closest flyby.

- 13 July – Researchers at the Large Hadron Collider report observing two exotic particles belonging to a new class, pentaquarks.
- 14 July
  - NASA's New Horizons spacecraft performs a close flyby of Pluto, becoming the first spacecraft in history to visit the distant world. It will explore the area for five months, before entering the Kuiper belt and eventually leaving the Solar System.
  - The latest State of the Climate report confirms that 2014 was the hottest year on record globally.
- 16 July
  - Scientists report the discovery of the Weyl fermion after an 85-year search. This massless quasiparticle could help in the development of future electronics such as quantum computing.
  - A new study adds to the growing evidence that polar bears are unable to adapt to a warming Arctic.
- 17 July – Nanowires are used by Dutch researchers to boost solar fuel cell efficiency tenfold, while using 10,000 times less precious material.
- 20 July
  - Stephen Hawking, British physicist, helps launch a well-funded effort, called Breakthrough Initiatives, to search for extraterrestrial life and attempt to answer the question: Are we alone?
  - Through private and international partnerships, the cost of colonising the Moon could be reduced by 90 percent, according to a joint study released by the National Space Society and the Space Frontier Foundation and reviewed by an independent team of experts.
- 21 July
  - The latest global analysis of temperature data from NOAA shows that the first half of 2015 was the hottest such period on record, at 0.85 °C (1.53 °F) above the 20th century average, surpassing the previous record set in 2010 by 0.09 °C (0.16 °F). The Earth also experienced its hottest ever June.
  - Men who become fathers experience weight gain and an increase in body mass index according to a new, large-scale study that tracked more than 10,000 men over a 20-year period. Men who didn't become dads actually lost weight over the same time period.
  - A new computer program is the first to recognise sketches more accurately than a human.
  - A potential new class of antibiotics based on modified sugar molecules is reported.
- 22 July
  - The results of a trial involving 1,322 patients shows further evidence that solanezumab can slow Alzheimer's disease.
  - US firm Second Sight announces the first age-related macular degeneration patient has received its Argus II bionic eye, at Manchester Royal Eye Hospital in the UK, as part of a groundbreaking study.
  - A promising new treatment using eye drops to treat cataracts is reported by the University of California, San Diego.
- 23 July
  - NASA announces the discovery of Kepler-452b, a confirmed exoplanet that is near-Earth-size and found orbiting the habitable zone of a Sun-like star.
  - A provocative new paper by climate scientists including James Hansen warns that future sea level rises may have been dramatically underestimated, and that even 2 °C of global warming is "highly dangerous".
  - Intel and Micron unveil 3D XPoint, a new memory technology that is 1,000 times faster than NAND and 10 times denser than conventional DRAM.
- 24 July – The 133-million-year-old fossil of Tetrapodophis amplectus, the first four-legged snake to be found, is reported by paleontologists in Brazil.
- 29 July
  - The current world population of 7.3 billion is predicted to reach 8.5 billion by 2030, 9.7 billion in 2050 and 11.2 billion in 2100, according to a new analysis of data by the UN.
  - The first artificial ribosome is created, by researchers at the University of Illinois at Chicago and Northwestern University.

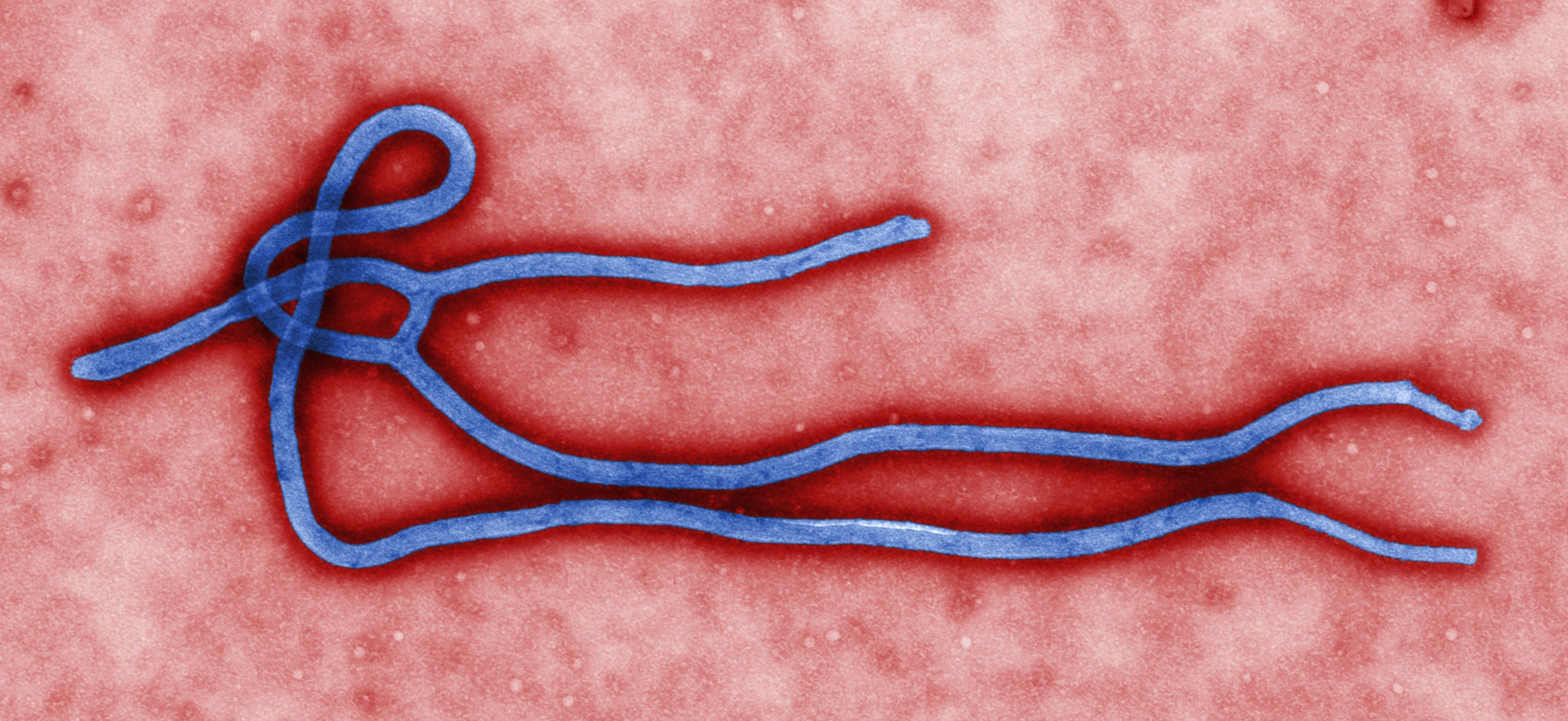
31 July: An ebola vaccine is found to be 100% successful in an initial trial.

- 30 July
  - Scientists report that the Philae spacecraft, that landed on comet 67P/Churyumov-Gerasimenko in November 2014, detected at least 16 organic compounds, of which four (including acetamide, acetone, methyl isocyanate and propionaldehyde) were detected for the first time on a comet.
  - The first aurora beyond the Solar System is reported, on a brown dwarf 18 light years from Earth.
  - Astronomers report the discovery of HD 219134 b, a rocky exoplanet, due to its size of 1.6 Earth and density of 6 g/cm^{3}, that is the closest such exoplanet to Earth, at 21.25 light-years away.
  - A new technique for obtaining nanoscale images of the brain at higher resolution than ever before is announced by Boston scientists.
- 31 July
  - An ebola vaccine developed by the Public Health Agency of Canada is found to be 100% successful in an initial trial.
  - By studying the structure and temperature of butterfly wings, researchers have observed physical properties that could hugely improve the efficiency of solar energy.

=== August ===
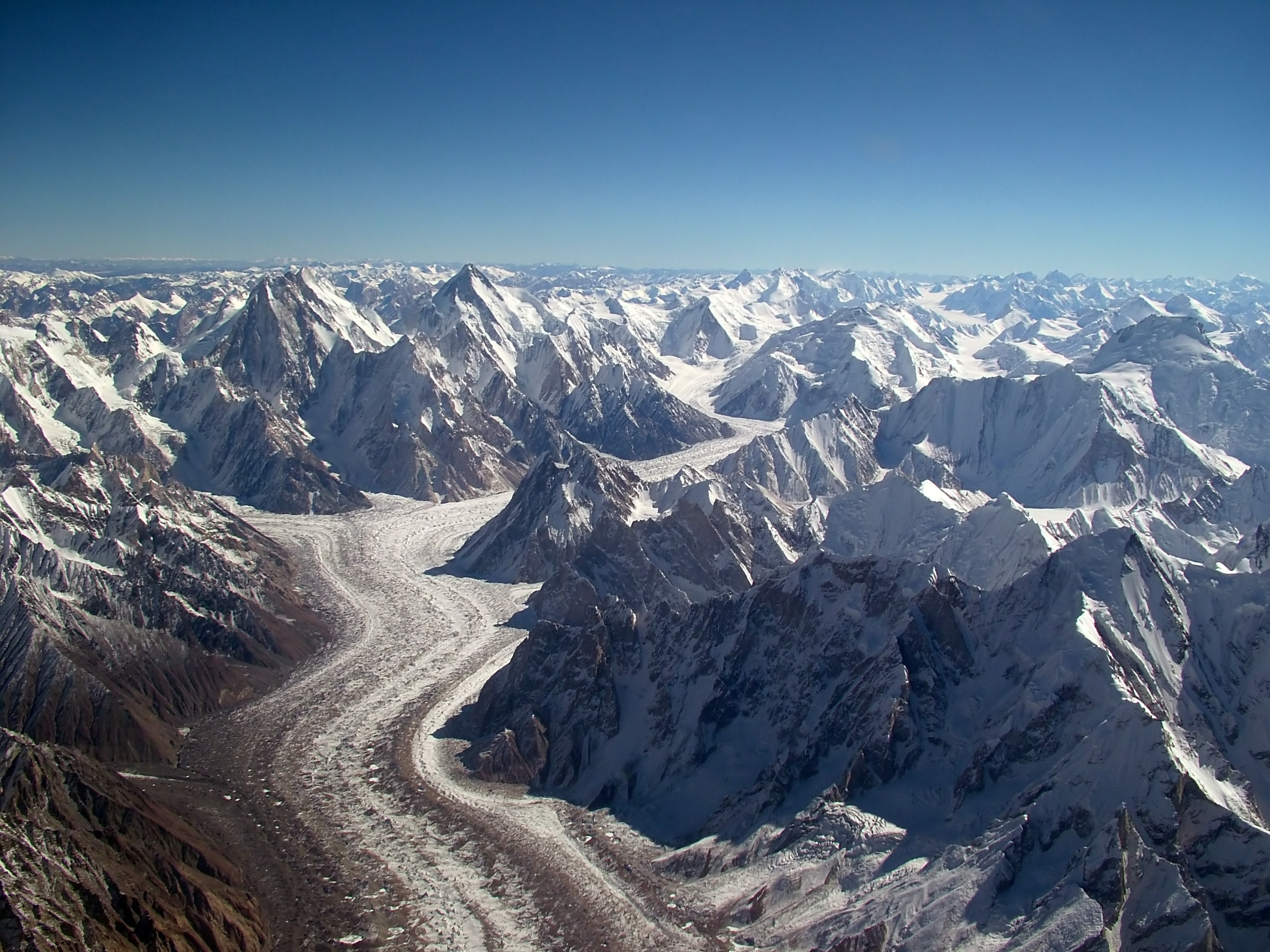
3 August: Glacier loss worldwide is reported to be "unprecedented" and occurring faster than ever.

- 3 August
  - Researchers have demonstrated that even if a geoengineering solution to CO_{2} emissions could be found, it would not be enough to save the oceans.
  - A new comprehensive analysis of global glacier changes in the Journal of Glaciology concludes that melting rates are "unprecedented" and faster than ever.
- 4 August
  - The FDA approves Spritam, the first 3D-printed pill.
  - Spicy foods are linked to increased longevity in a study published by the British Medical Journal.
  - Plans are unveiled by Plymouth University for "Mayflower Autonomous Research Ship" (MARS), the world's first full-sized, fully autonomous uncrewed ship to cross the Atlantic Ocean.
  - The first-ever genetic analysis of people with extremely high intelligence reveals small but important genetic differences between some of the brightest people in the United States and the general population.
- 5 August – Astronomers at the Keck Observatory announce a new record for the most distant galaxy ever observed. Known as EGSY8p7, its light needed 13.2 billion years to reach Earth.
- 6 August – The first known venomous frog species, Corythomantis greeningi and Aparasphenodon brunoi, are identified by researchers in Brazil.
- 10 August – By measuring the energy output from a large portion of the Universe with greater precision than ever before, astronomers have determined that the Universe is gradually fading across all wavelengths. In effect, the Universe is slowly dying.

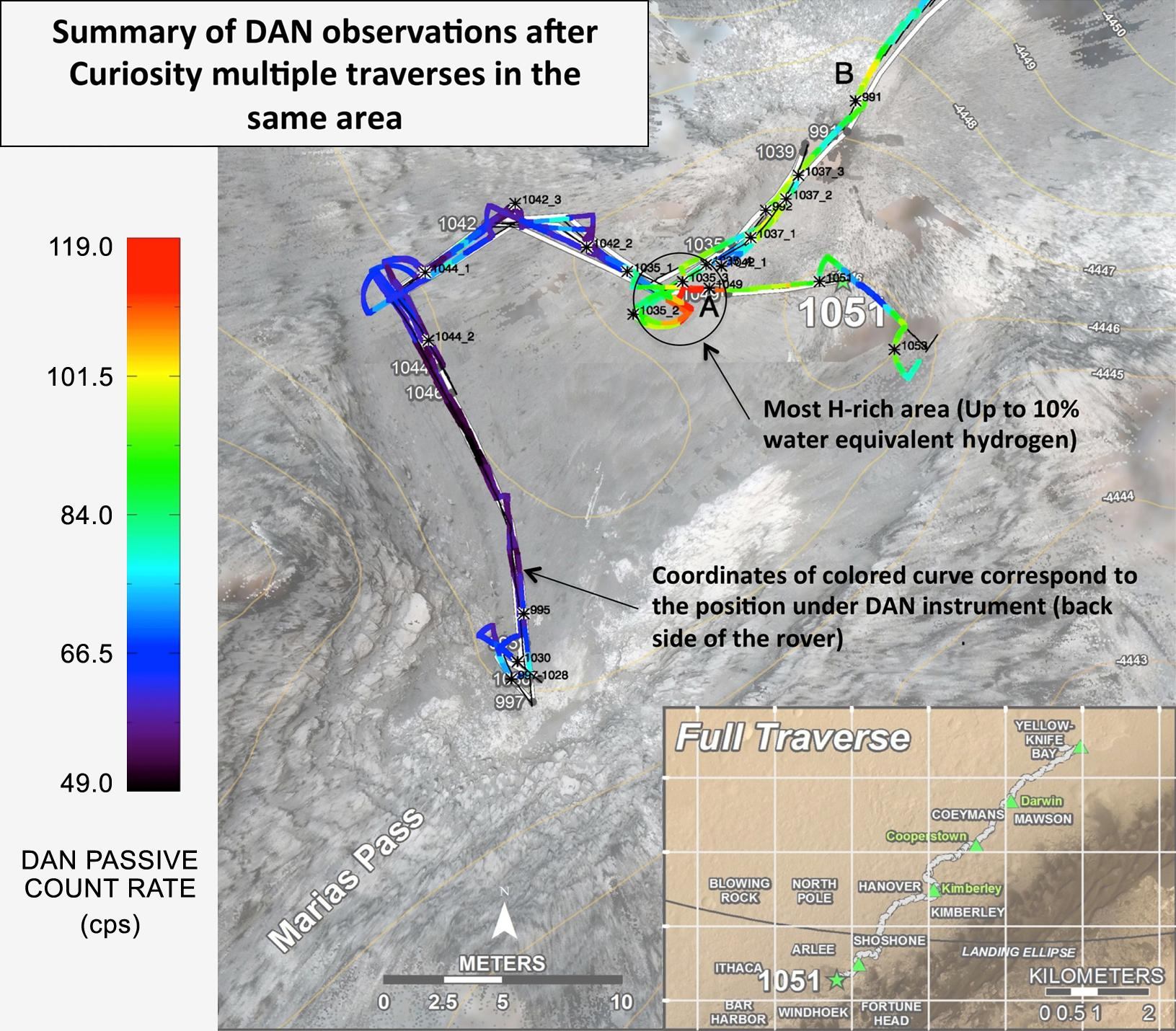
19 August: Hydrogen-rich area detected at "Marias Pass" on Mars by the Curiosity rover.

- 13 August
  - An endangered species, the black-footed ferret, is successfully reproduced using frozen sperm from a ferret that had been dead for 20 years.
  - By altering a single gene, phosphodiesterase-4B (PDE4B), researchers have increased the intelligence of mice, while decreasing their fear and anxiety. This raises hopes of better treatments for human cognitive disorders in the future.
- 17 August – Based on studies with the Lunar Atmosphere and Dust Environment Explorer (LADEE) spacecraft, NASA scientists report the detection of neon in the exosphere of the moon.
- 19 August
  - NASA reports that there is "no scientific basis" that the world will end due to a rumored impact of an asteroid near Puerto Rico between 15 and 28 September 2015.
  - NASA scientists report that the Dynamic Albedo of Neutrons (DAN) instrument on the Curiosity rover detected an unusual hydrogen-rich area, at "Marias Pass," on Mars. The hydrogen found seems related to water or hydroxyl ions in rocks within three feet beneath the rover, according to the scientists.
  - People working a 55-hour week have a 33% increased risk of stroke than those working a 35- to 40-hour week, along with a 13% increased risk of coronary heart disease, according to a study published in The Lancet.
  - Researchers at George Washington University demonstrate a process that turns atmospheric carbon dioxide into carbon nanofibers.
  - The Sumatran rhinoceros is declared extinct in the wild in Malaysia.
  - Using stem cells, researchers have developed a miniature human brain in a dish with the equivalent maturity of a five-week-old fetus. It is believed this model – the most advanced of its kind ever created – could be used for better and more accurate testing of drugs.

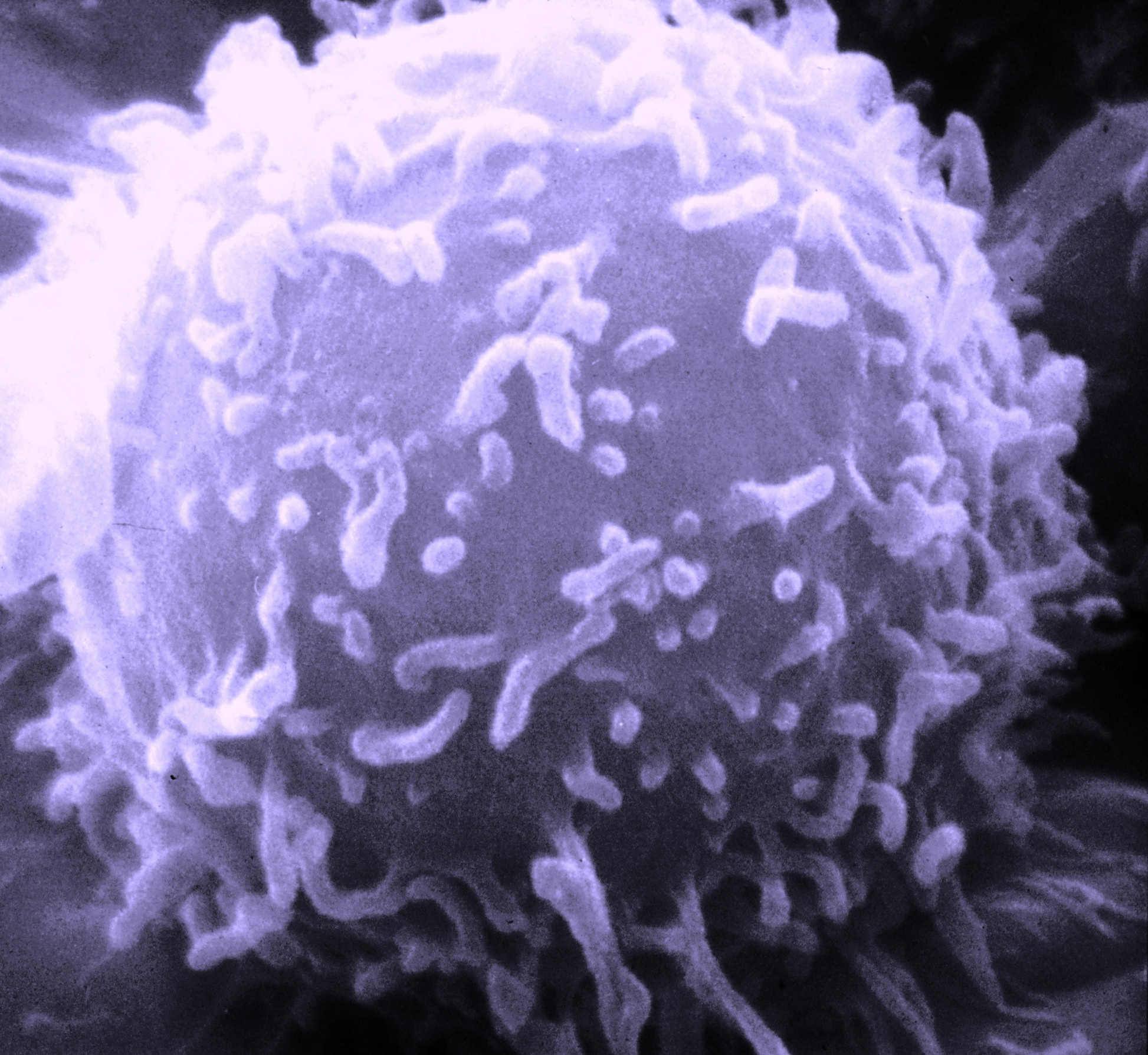
24 August: A new way of "switching off" cancer cell growth, using the PLEKHA7 protein, is reported by the Mayo Clinic.

- 20 August
  - July 2015 was the hottest month on Earth since records began in 1880, according to data from NOAA.
  - A new report in the journal Science advocates for improved management and protection of boreal forests in response to global changes this century.
- 21 August
  - A new study published in Nature "removes any doubt" that rising levels of greenhouse gases were the primary driver of glacier retreat during the end of the last Ice Age.
  - Giant galaxies with an absence of young stars are more suitable for habitable planets, researchers say.
- 24 August
  - A new way of "switching off" cancer cell growth, using the PLEKHA7 protein, is reported by the Mayo Clinic.
  - Physicists achieve a breakthrough in fusion power, by containing superheated hydrogen plasma for five milliseconds, longer than any other effort before.
- 26 August – In a press briefing, NASA scientists warn that future sea level rise has been underestimated.
- 28 August – In a landmark study of scientific reproducibility published in Science, a group of 270 psychologists attempted to directly replicate 100 psychology studies from three top-tier psychological journals and found that about one-third to one-half of the original findings could be successfully reproduced.
- 31 August – Scientists claim to have discovered the first new human prion in almost 50 years.

=== September ===
- 1 September – Scientists report the discovery of Pentecopterus decorahens, the oldest described eurypterida (sea scorpions), an extinct arthropod group that lived as early as 467.3 million years ago. With an estimated length of up to 1.83 metres (6 ft 0 in), it has been described as "the first real big predator".
- 2 September
  - A report by Climate Action Tracker warns that pledges by governments for the upcoming UN climate change conference in Paris, are grossly inadequate if the rise in global temperatures is to be kept below 2 °C.
  - There are just over three trillion trees on Earth, according to a new assessment.
- 3 September
  - Researchers at MIT demonstrate the first 3D printing technique able to make transparent glass objects.
  - Philips introduces the world's first quantum dot monitor.
  - Scientists working on the Large Hadron Collider report that the production of quark–gluon plasma, a state of matter present in the early Universe, is possible with fewer particles than previously thought.
- 7 September – A bright fireball over Thailand, believed to be a bolide, is seen in Bangkok and some other locations.
- 10 September
  - Paleontologists report a new human-like species, Homo naledi, based on the discovery of 15 partial skeletons, the largest single find of its type in Africa. It is believed that H. naledi could have lived in Africa up to three million years ago and were capable of ritualistic behaviour. Although the discoverers claim the bones represent a new species of early humans, other experts contend that more evidence is needed before such a claim can be justified.
  - A report by scientists, ethicists and policy experts from the Hinxton Group states that research into genetically modified human embryos is "essential" and that GM babies could be "morally acceptable" in the future.
- 11 September
  - NASA releases the first clear images of Pluto's small moon Nix, showing rough edges and a prominent crater.
  - A study by the British Psychological Society warns that constant pressure on teenagers to use social media technology causes lower sleep quality, lower self-esteem, higher anxiety and increased depression levels.
  - Through DARPA, a 28-year-old paralysed man becomes the first person to feel physical sensations through a prosthetic hand directly connected to his brain.
- 13 September – A partial solar eclipse occurs.

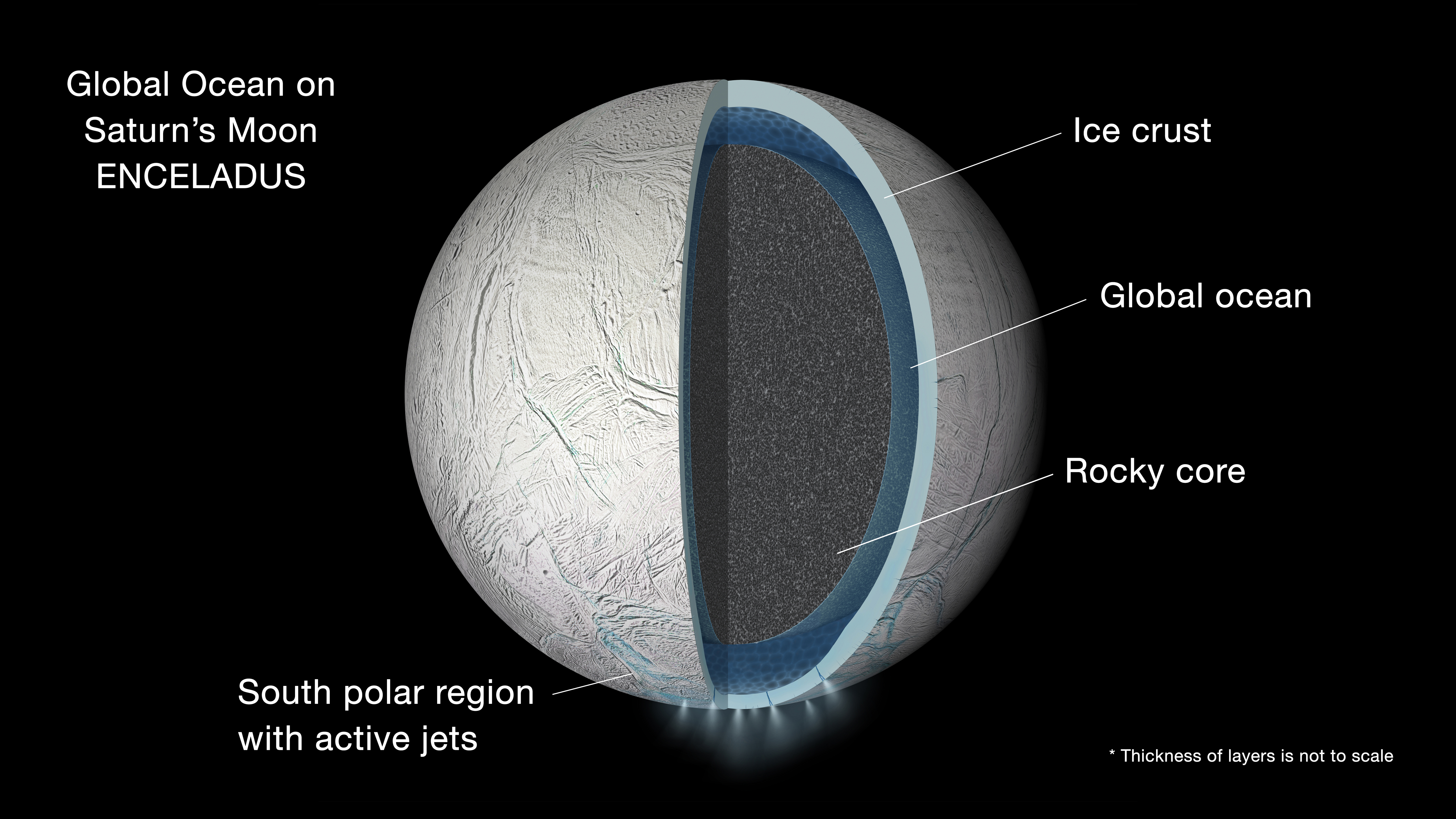
15 September: Global ocean found in Saturn's moon, Enceladus.

- 14 September
  - First observation of gravitational waves, announced 11 February 2016.
  - The next two years could be the hottest on record globally, according to research by the UK's Met Office.
  - Astronomers report unusual light fluctuations of KIC 8462852, an F-type main-sequence star in the constellation Cygnus, as detected by the Kepler space telescope, while searching for exoplanets. Various explanations have been presented, including those based on comets, asteroids, as well as, an alien civilization.
- 15 September – NASA's Cassini probe finds a global ocean lying beneath the icy crust of Saturn's geologically active moon Enceladus.
- 16 September
  - It is reported that oil companies knew that burning oil and gas could cause global warming since the 1970s but, nonetheless, funded deniers for years.
  - A study by WWF and the Zoological Society of London finds that populations of marine mammals, birds, fish and reptiles have declined by 49% since 1970. The report highlights tuna and mackerel as in a particularly dire state, having declined 74%.
- 22 September
  - Researchers announce discovery of the second known human pegivirus, HPgV-2.
  - Researchers teleport quantum information carried in light particles over 100 kilometres of optical fibre, four times farther than the previous record.
  - Scientists announce the discovery of a new dinosaur species, Ugrunaaluk kuukpikensis, a 30 foot long plant eater, that lived 69 million years ago above the Arctic Circle, the farthest north of any known dinosaur.
- 23 September
  - A NASA study indicates that oceanic phytoplankton are declining significantly in the Northern Hemisphere.
  - Tiny carbon-capturing motors are developed at the University of California, potentially offering a way to absorb carbon dioxide from the oceans.
- 24 September
  - A paraplegic American man walks again using a computer system that reroutes signals from his brain to electrodes on his knees.
  - Scientists build a wrench just 1.7 nanometers wide, providing a fundamentally new way to control the shape of molecules.

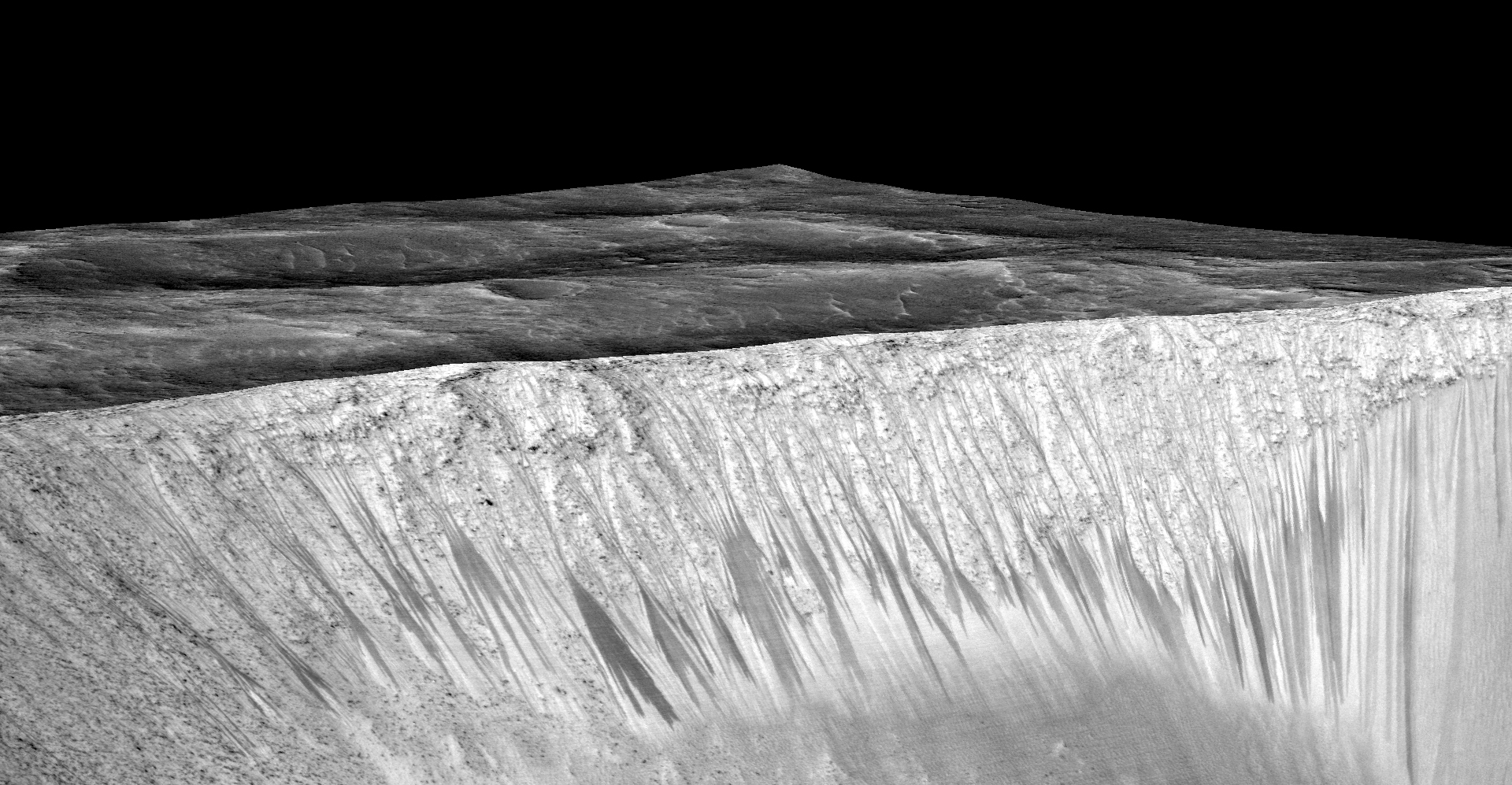
28 September: After a review of evidence from the Mars Reconnaissance Orbiter, NASA concluded that liquid water occurs on present day Mars.

- 27 September – A total lunar eclipse, dubbed a "supermoon" because of its apparent larger size in the sky, takes place over Europe, the Middle East, Africa, and the Americas. The next supermoon eclipse will not occur until October 2033.
- 28 September
  - NASA scientists, including Lujendra Ojha et al., report evidence, for the first time, supporting the presence of liquid water (in the form of liquid brine) currently flowing on the planet Mars (conference videos).
  - Angustopila dominikae, the smallest snail ever found, is reported in Southern China. The species measures just 0.86mm in height.
  - Researchers at Queen Mary University of London demonstrate a self-assembling organic material that grows and changes shape, which could lead to artificial arteries.
  - Because of warming oceans, king crabs threaten to overrun Antarctic marine ecosystems within a few decades, according to research by the Florida Institute of Technology.
- 29 September – Researchers develop a new test, ViroCap, that can detect nearly any virus known to infect humans and animals. The researchers are making the technology publicly available worldwide, for the benefit of patients and research.

=== October ===
- 1 October – IBM announces a breakthrough that could accelerate the replacement of silicon transistors with carbon nanotubes and work down to 1.8 nm node sizes.

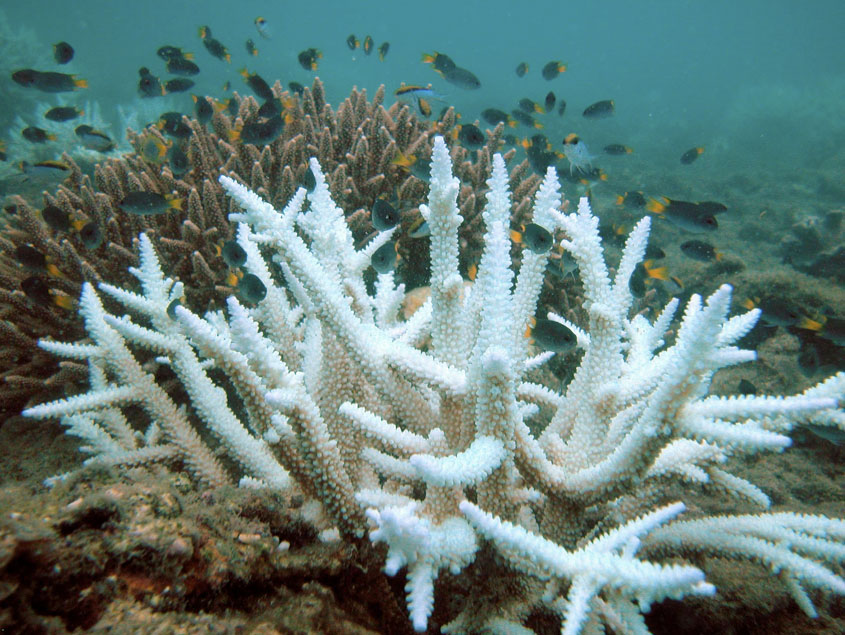
8 October: A third global coral bleaching event is announced, likely to be the worst on record.

- 2 October
  - A new study adds to previous findings that dinosaurs were driven to extinction by a combination of increased volcanism at the Deccan Traps and the Chicxulub asteroid impact.
  - Fusion reactors could be economically viable within a few decades, and policy makers should start planning to build them as a replacement for conventional nuclear power stations, according to research by Durham University.
- 5 October
  - Nearly one-third of cacti species face extinction, according to the first comprehensive global assessment, largely due to illegal trade and other human activity.
  - NASA reports recurrent slope lineae, wet brine flows, may have been detected on Mount Sharp near the Curiosity rover. In addition, an estimated 20,000 to 40,000 heat-resistant bacterial spores were on the Curiosity rover at launch. As many as 1,000 times more than that may not have been counted.
- 6 October
  - Takaaki Kajita and Arthur B. McDonald win the 2015 Nobel Prize in Physics "for the discovery of neutrino oscillations, which shows that neutrinos have mass."
  - Researchers build a quantum logic gate in silicon for the first time, making calculations between two qubits of information possible – and thereby clearing the final hurdle to making silicon quantum computers a reality.
- 7 October – Tomas Lindahl, Paul L. Modrich and Aziz Sancar win the 2015 Nobel Prize in Chemistry, for explaining "the basic mechanisms that help to guard the integrity of our genomes."

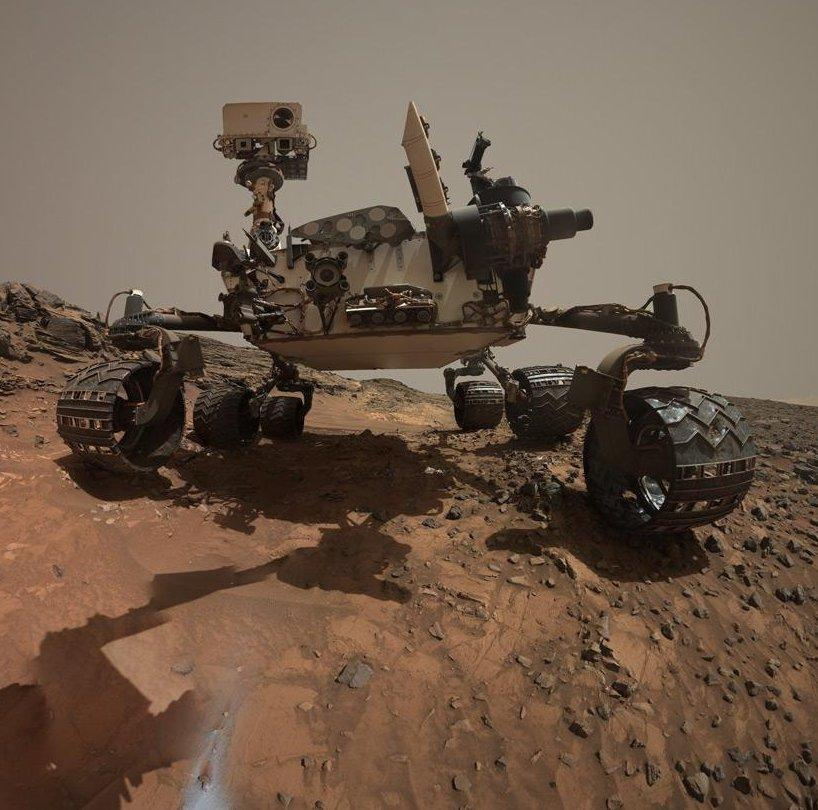
8 & 28 October: Details of a human mission to Mars, and related health hazards, released.

- 8 October
  - NASA releases details of its long-term plan for human exploration of Mars.
  - NASA confirms, based on results from the Curiosity rover (and Mars Reconnaissance Orbiter), that lakes and streams existed in Gale crater on Mars 3.3 – 3.8 billion years ago delivering sediments to build up the lower layers of Mount Sharp.
  - NASA announces that the New Horizons spacecraft has detected blue skies and water ice on Pluto.
  - Scientists confirm that a third global coral bleaching event is underway that is likely to be the most intense ever recorded.
  - Up to 1 billion people are at risk of blindness by 2050, according to researchers at the Brien Holden Vision Institute.
  - Following a comprehensive, 10-year effort, researchers identify 238 genes that affect aging in yeast cells.
- 13 October
  - Astronomers discover V774104, an object which initially appeared to have a 103 AU distance from the Sun, which would have made it the furthest known object from the sun. Upon public release of the object in March 2018, it was only 90 AU from the Sun, making it only the third furthest known object.
  - Scientists achieve a breakthrough in finding a general cure for cancer by attaching malaria proteins to cancer cells, which appears effective on 90% of cancer types. Human trials are expected to begin within four years.
  - Forensic scientists report a chemical procedure that can identify gender from a fingerprint. The fingerprint test is based on the much higher levels of certain amino acids in the perspiration of women than in men.
- 14 October – Scientists report finding fossil evidence of life on the very young Earth 4.1 billion years ago, 300 million years older than known earlier. According to one of the researchers, "If life arose relatively quickly on Earth ... then it could be common in the universe.
- 15 October
  - Researchers at Stockholm University develop a material for capturing CO_{2} in the presence of water.
  - Chattanooga announces that a public utility will offer the world's first 10 gigabit broadband service across a large community-wide territory.
- 20 October
  - Sulfur-limonene polysulphide is used to synthesise a new material able to cheaply and efficiently absorb mercury pollution from soils and water.
  - Researchers in California use big data to identify over 100 novel cancer driver genes.
  - Sunscreen chemicals such as oxybenzone may be contributing to the decline of coral reefs popular with tourists, according to a study by the University of Central Florida.

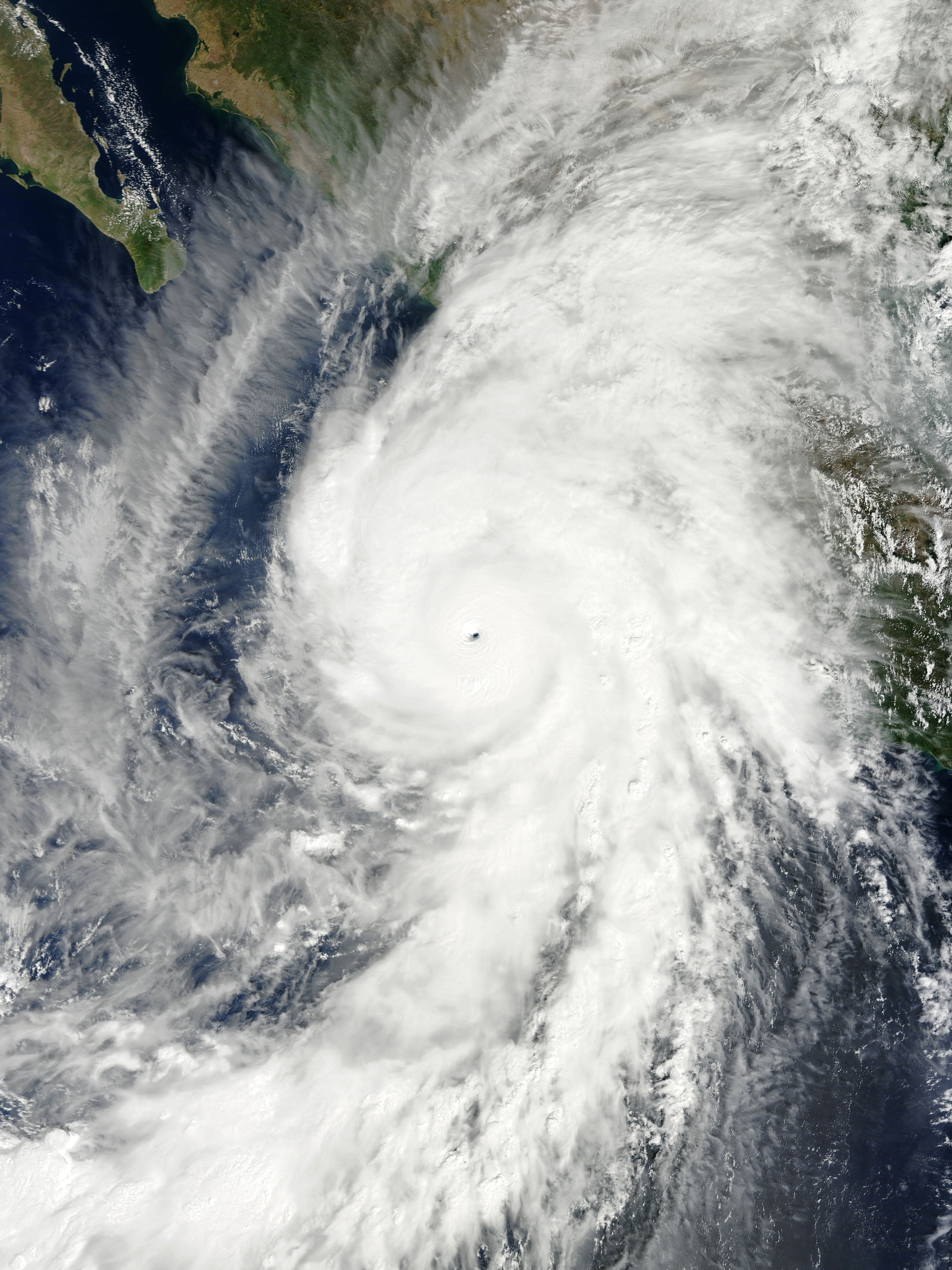
23 October: Hurricane Patricia is the strongest hurricane ever recorded in the Western hemisphere.

- 21 October
  - The first direct observation of a solar system being torn apart by a white dwarf is described in the journal Nature. The star, known as WD 1145+017, is transited by at least one, and probably several, disintegrating planetesimals, with periods ranging from 4.5 hours to 4.9 hours.
  - Astronomers using the ESO Very Large Telescope identify the hottest and most massive contact binary. The double star system, VFTS 352, is located 160,000 light-years away in the Tarantula Nebula, which is part of the Large Magellanic Cloud.
  - Scientists report that the quantum entanglement phenomenon is strongly supported based on a "loophole-free Bell test" study.
  - The National Oceanic and Atmospheric Administration (NOAA) reports that September's global average temperature was the largest departure from normal for any month on record.
  - The Eastern Santa Cruz Tortoise (Chelonoidis donfaustoi), a newly discovered species of giant tortoise on the Galápagos Islands, is described in the journal PLOS ONE.
  - The European Space Agency reports that Oxia Planum on the planet Mars is the preferred landing site for the ExoMars rover.
- 22 October – A new gene therapy cures muscular dystrophy in dogs, with human trials expected to follow in the next few years, according to researchers at the University of Missouri.
- 23 October
  - Hurricane Patricia becomes the most intense tropical cyclone ever observed in the Western Hemisphere in terms of barometric pressure and the strongest globally in terms of maximum sustained winds.
  - U.S. physicists use lasers to create positrons – the antiparticle of electrons – in record numbers and density.

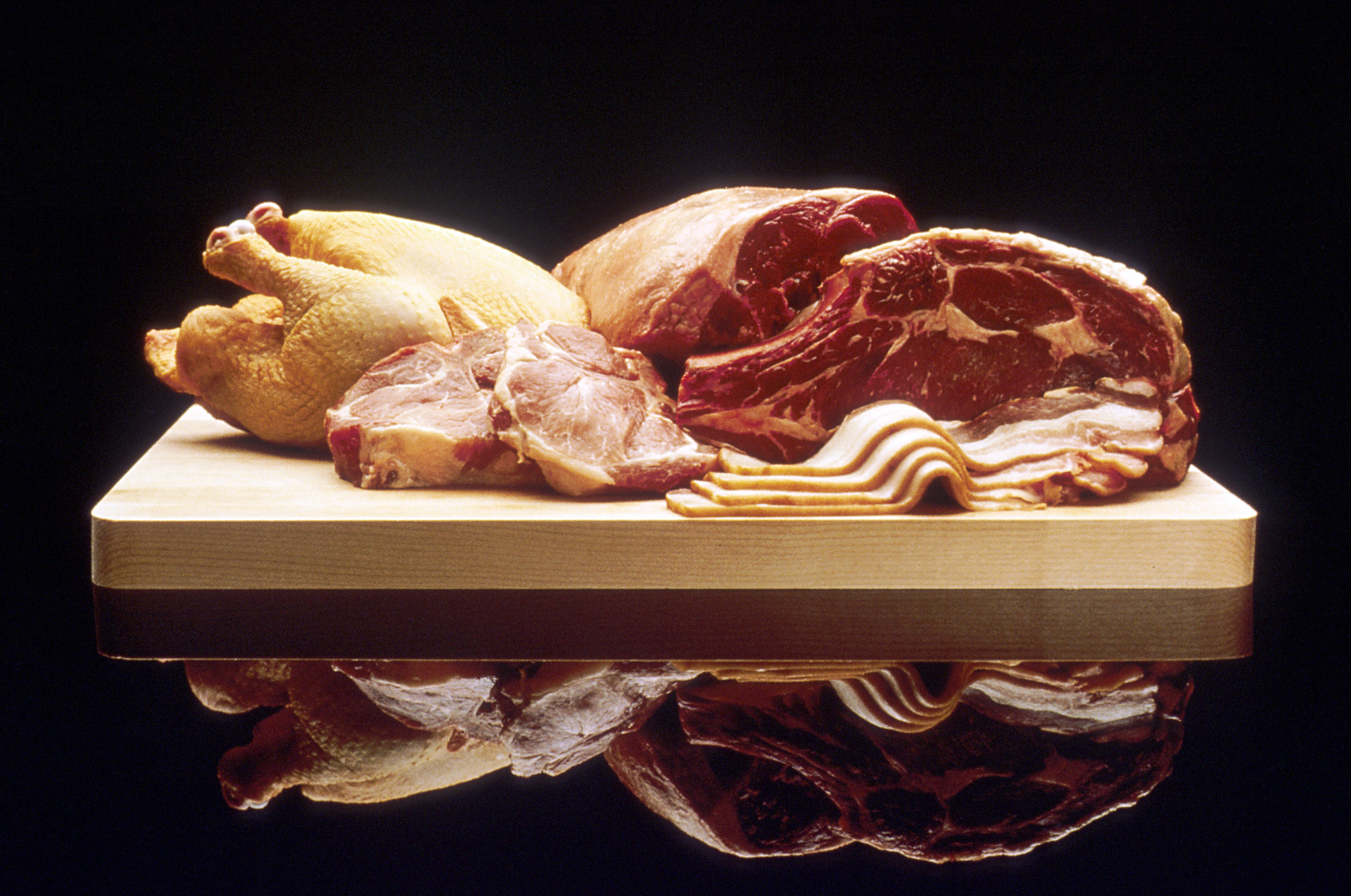
26 October: Eating processed or red meat linked to some cancers by WHO.

- 26 October
  - The International Agency for Research on Cancer of the World Health Organization reports that eating processed meat (e.g., bacon, ham, hot dogs, sausages) or red meat is linked to some cancers.
  - A new study by MIT predicts that extreme heatwaves will make large parts of the Gulf region intolerable for humans in the late 21st century.
- 27 October
  - Researchers at the University of Bristol create a tractor beam using "holograms" made of sound waves, able to move small objects from up to 40 cm away.
  - Using computer models of geoengineering, a study in PNAS shows that a halving of Katrina-sized hurricanes over the next half century might be possible, but only if a new and safer aerosol can be found.
- 28 October – NASA administrator, Charlie Bolden, presents the next steps for a human journey to Mars at the Center for American Progress in Washington, D.C.
- 29 October – NASA Office of Inspector General issues a health hazards report related to human missions to Mars.
- 30 October – Researchers at the VUMC Cancer Center Amsterdam develop a blood test that, from a single drop of blood, can diagnose cancer with a probability of 97%, and about 6-8% probability of a false diagnosis, in healthy patients.
- 31 October – Asteroid 2015 TB_{145}, a near-Earth asteroid roughly 600 meters (2,000 feet) in diameter, passes 1.27 lunar distances from Earth.

=== November ===
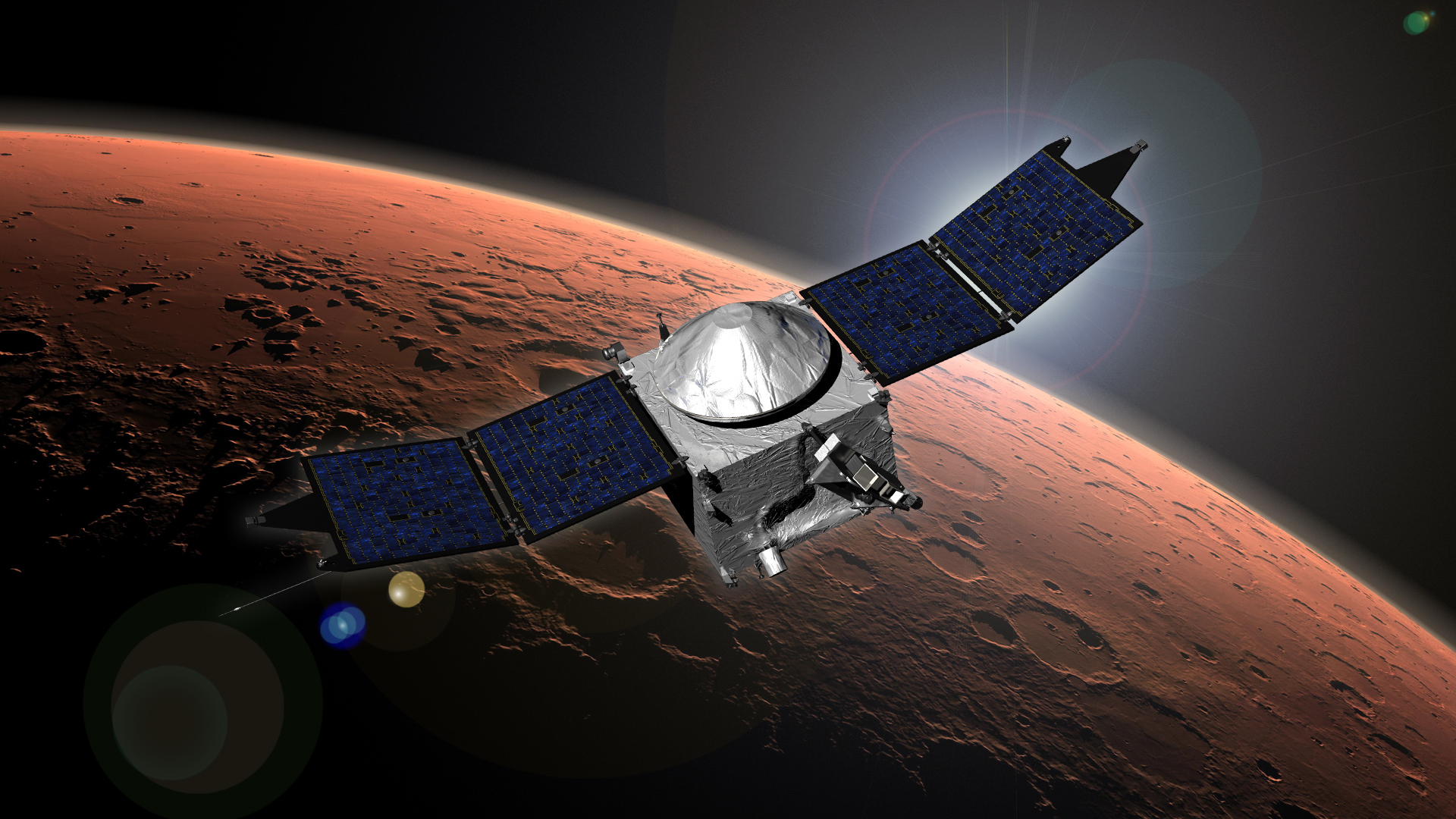
5 November: MAVEN, an orbiter circling Mars, helped determine that the solar wind stripped away the atmosphere from Mars over the years.

- 4 November – New Horizons completes the last in a series of four maneuvers putting it on course for a rendezvous with 486958 Arrokoth in January 2019, a billion miles beyond Pluto. This propulsive maneuver is the most distant trajectory correction ever performed by any spacecraft.
- 5 November
  - NASA scientists report, based on results from the MAVEN orbiter circling Mars, that the solar wind is responsible for stripping away the atmosphere of Mars over the years.
  - A chemical that could potentially be used in eye drops to reverse cataracts, the leading cause of blindness, is identified by scientists at the University of California.
  - In a world first, gene-edited immune cells are used to treat 'incurable' leukaemia in a one-year-old girl.
  - Stem cell scientists at the University Health Network identify an entirely new "two tier" process of how blood is made, overturning decades of established science. The researchers claim their finding could lead to radically improved and personalised treatments for blood disorders.
- 11 November
  - Groundwork begins on the 24.5m Giant Magellan Telescope. Early operations are expected to begin by 2021, with full operations by 2025.
  - Scientists report finding a 110,000-years-old tooth fossil containing DNA from Denisovan hominin, an extinct species of human in the genus Homo.

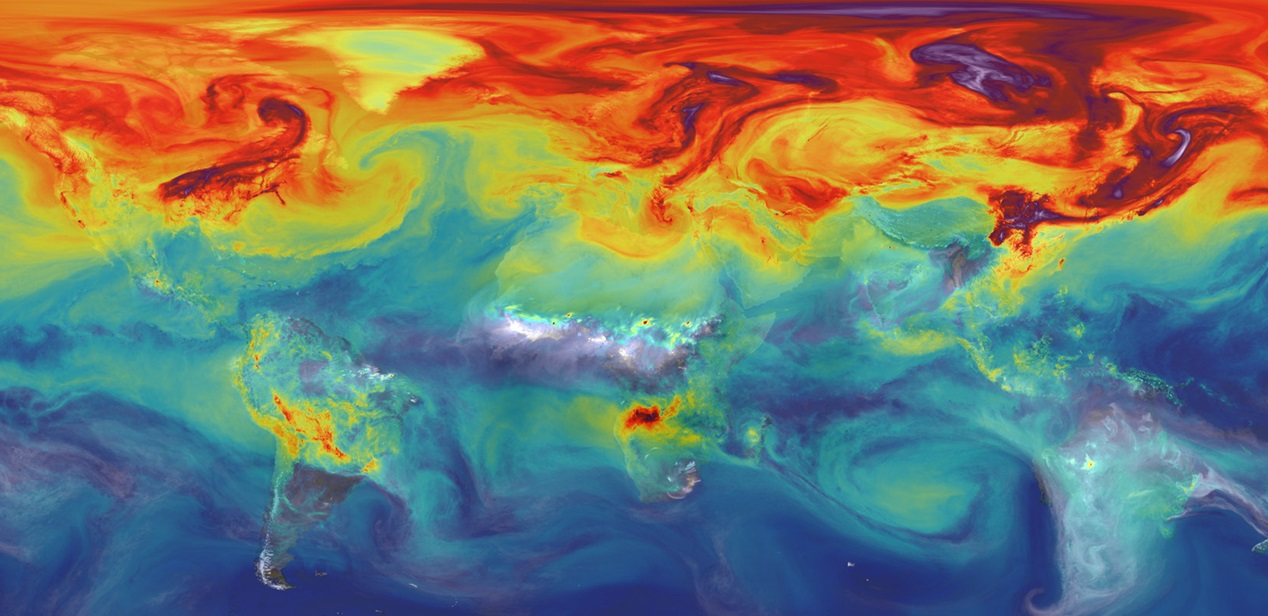
12 November: CO_{2} in Earth's atmosphere if half of global-warming emissions are not absorbed. (NASA computer simulation).

- 12 November
  - NASA scientists report that human-made carbon dioxide (CO_{2}) continues to increase above levels not seen in hundreds of thousands of years: currently, about half of the carbon dioxide released from the burning of fossil fuels remains in the atmosphere and is not absorbed by vegetation and the oceans.
  - MIT invents an efficient new shockwave-based process for the desalination of water.
  - The huge Zachariæ Isstrøm glacier in Greenland, which holds enough water to raise global sea levels by half a metre, is reported to be melting and crumbling into the North Atlantic Ocean.
- 16 November
  - Scientists report that Haramiyavia, a type of Haramiyida living about 200 million years ago and at first thought to be the earliest known herbivores among very early mammals, may not have been mammals after all, but part of a more ancestral side branch instead.
  - Iranian researchers at the University of Tehran demonstrate the latest generation of their humanoid robot, Surena III.
  - Nano-scale submarines built from 244 atoms and capable of moving at 1 inch per second are demonstrated by Rice University.
- 17 November
  - A point mutation in a gene of the serotonin 2B receptor is linked to impulsive behaviour in humans, particularly those who are drunk, according to research by the University of Helsinki in Finland.
  - Scientists develop a self-healing, flexible sensor that mimics the self-healing properties of human skin. Incidental scratches or cuts to the sensors "heal" themselves in less than one day.
- 18 November
  - University of Washington engineers report the development of a novel technology that uses a Wi-Fi router to power devices.
  - Astronomers at the University of Arizona capture the first image of an exoplanet being formed in a protoplanetary disk. The object, LkCa 15 b, is located 450 light years away, orbiting a young star named LkCa15.
  - University of Massachusetts Medical School researchers have created a greatly improved implementation of CRISPR with potentially far reaching implications.

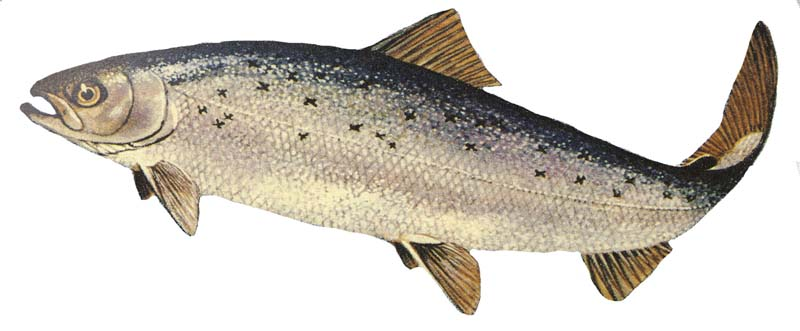
19 November: FDA approves genetically modified salmon for human consumption.

- 19 November – For the first time, the FDA approves genetically modified salmon for human consumption.
- 20 November – Doctors use virtual reality in surgery for the first time, which helps to clear the blocked coronary artery of a male patient.
- 23 November – The genome of the tardigrade is published, revealing that 17.5% is foreign DNA (from other organisms). It is the only animal able to survive in the vacuum of space.
- 24 November – A review of scientific literature by Bristol University finds no substantive evidence of a "pause" or "hiatus" in global warming.
- 25 November – By switching off, one by one, almost 18,000 genes — 90 per cent of the entire human genome — scientists at the University of Toronto identify genes that are essential for cell survival.
- 30 November – The U.S. Geological Survey predicts that between 16 and 24 percent of Alaskan permafrost will disappear by 2100.

=== December ===
- 1–3 December – The International Summit on Human Gene Editing is held in Washington.
- 1 December
  - Blood vessel-like structures found in an 80 million-year-old hadrosaur fossil are confirmed to be original to the animal, and not biofilm or other contaminants.
  - A new "Polarised 3D" system developed by MIT can increase the resolution of conventional 3-D imaging devices 1,000-fold.
  - Epson debuts "PaperLab", the world's first office papermaking system that turns waste paper into new sheets.
- 2 December – A new mass spectral imaging device at Colorado State University allows 3-D mapping of cellular composition at a resolution of 75 nanometres wide and 20 nanometres deep — more than 100 times higher than was previously possible.

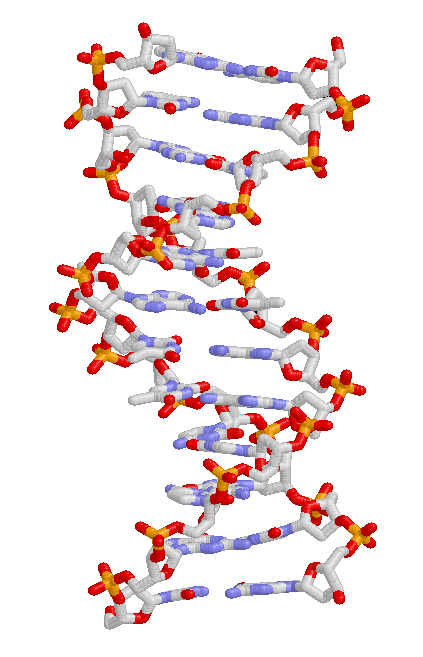
3 December: Call for moratorium on inheritable human genome edits.

- 3 December
  - The LISA Pathfinder mission is launched by ESA.
  - Scientists of major world academies call for a moratorium on inheritable human genome edits, including those related to CRISPR-Cas9 technologies.
- 4 December
  - The Earth Institute at Columbia University publishes a study that reinforces previous findings that the Medieval warm period was limited in extent and not global.
  - Dams and irrigation raise the global human freshwater footprint almost 20 percent higher than previously thought, according to new research by Stockholm University.
- 7 December
  - The Japanese Akatsuki probe, which failed to orbit Venus in 2010, is reported to have succeeded following a second attempt.
  - Researchers at Eindhoven University of Technology create the world's smallest temperature sensor, powered by radio waves, which they say could be used in developing the Internet of Things.
- 9 December
  - The world's first "test tube" puppies created through IVF are born in the US after years of attempts.
  - NASA scientists report that the bright spots on the dwarf planet Ceres, including those in Ceres' largest bright spot region located in Occator crater, may be related to a type of salt, particularly a form of brine containing magnesium sulfate hexahydrite (MgSO_{4}·6H_{2}O); the spots were also found to be associated with ammonia-rich clays.
- 10 December
  - The first helium plasma test is conducted at the Wendelstein 7-X fusion device.
  - Based on data from the Atacama Large Millimeter/submillimeter Array (ALMA), astronomers report the possibility of a large "super-Earth" or Planet X lurking at the far edges of the Solar System in the direction of Alpha Centauri.
- 11 December
  - Paleontologists report the discovery of Hualianceratops wucaiwanensis, an herbivorous ceratopsian dinosaur that lived about 160 million years ago in western China.
  - Disney Research unveils "FaceDirector", a new method of synthesising an actor's facial performances in post-production to get just the right emotion, instead of re-shooting the scene multiple times.
  - OpenAI is founded.

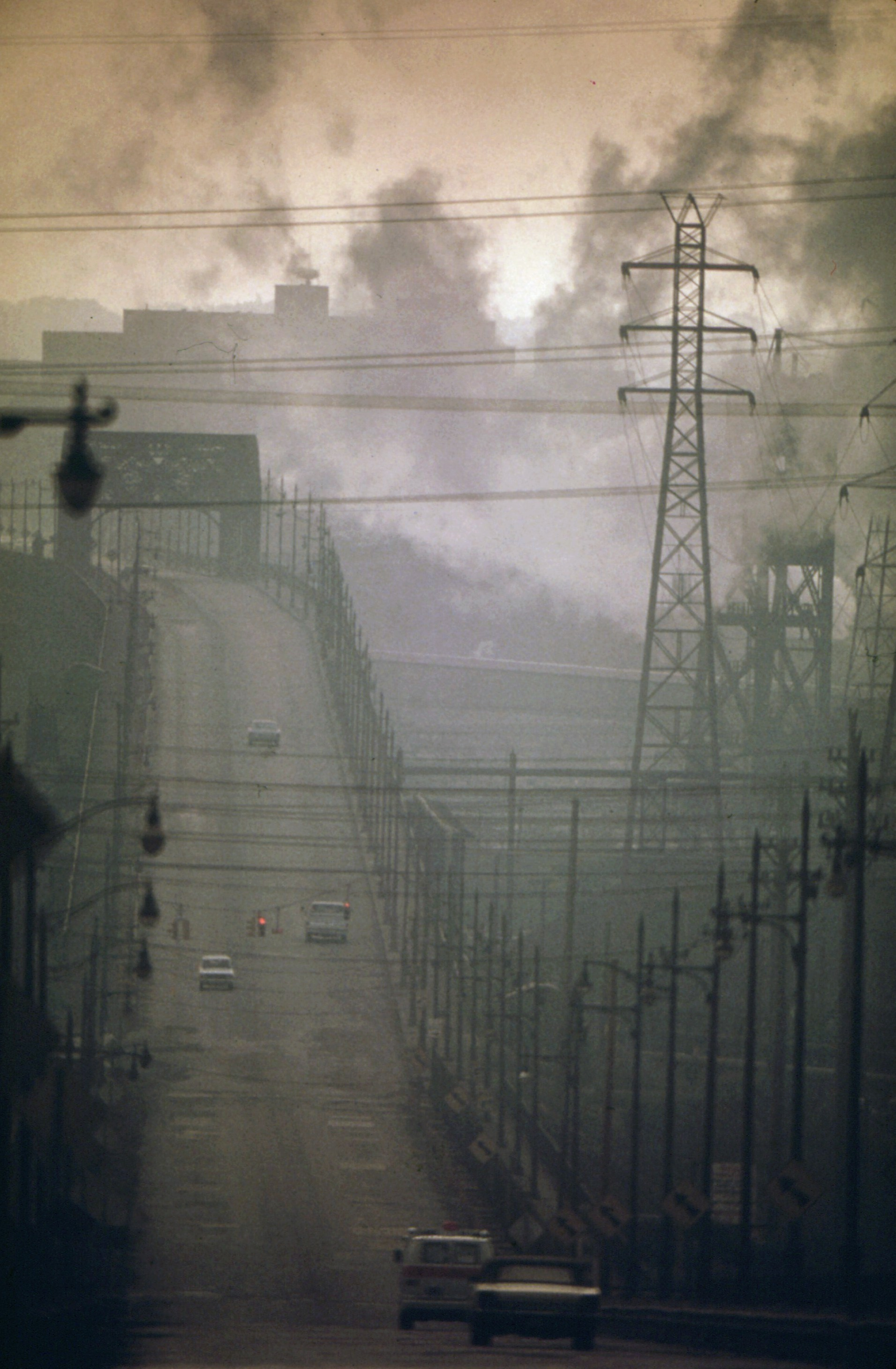
16 December: Cancer mainly the result of environmental factors.

- 14 December – A new atomic force microscope is announced by MIT, capable of scanning images 2,000 times faster than existing commercial models. This allows it to operate with near-real-time video speed to capture structures as small as a fraction of a nanometer from single strands of DNA down to individual hydrogen bonds.
- 15 December
  - Two teams of physicists, working independently at CERN, report preliminary hints of a possible new subatomic particle (more specifically, the ATLAS and CMS experiments, using 13 TeV proton collision data, showed a moderate excess around 750 GeV, in the two-photon spectrum): if real, the particle could be either a heavier version of a Higgs boson or a graviton.
  - A new world record for the smallest inkjet image is announced, after researchers in Switzerland used quantum dots to produce a 0.0092 mm^{2} (80 μm x 115 μm) colour photo of tropical clown fish at a resolution of 25,000 dpi.
- 16 December – Cancer is overwhelmingly a result of environmental factors, and not largely down to bad luck, a study by medical scientists suggests. Maintaining a healthy weight, eating a healthy diet, minimizing alcohol and eliminating smoking reduces the risk of developing the disease, according to researchers.
- 17 December – Researchers develop a new Big Data statistical method, known as iGWAS, which identifies five longevity loci associated with healthy aging.
- 19 December – A final flyby of Enceladus, moon of Saturn, by the Cassini spacecraft, is reported by NASA.
- 21 December
  - U.S. company SpaceX, headed by Elon Musk, achieves a historic milestone in space flight by landing a Falcon 9 rocket vertically, demonstrating that cheaper reusable rockets might be possible.
  - In response to the dramatic decline of lion populations in the wild, the U.S. Fish and Wildlife Service announces two lion subspecies as endangered and threatened. Panthera leo leo, found in India and Africa, is listed as endangered, and Panthera leo melanochaita, in eastern and southern Africa, is listed as threatened.
- 22 December – NASA delays the launch of the InSight mission to Mars in March 2016, due to an air leak in one of the primary scientific instruments. The mission was launched in May 2018.
- 28 December – Scientists report the discovery of a new type of basaltic rock, rich in ilmenite, a black mineral, on the moon by Chang'e-3, a Chinese spacecraft that landed on the moon in 2013.
- 30 December – The seventh row of the periodic table is officially declared full, after the discovery of elements 113, 115, 117 and 118.

== Awards ==
- Queen Elizabeth Prize for Engineering: Robert S. Langer.
- UNESCO Medal for the Development of Nanoscience and Nanotechnologies: Valentin Bukhtoyarov, Constance Chang-Hasnain, Soodabeh Davaran, Vladimir Fortov, Mikhail Kovalchuk, Tebello Nyokong, Mikhail Selyanin and Shem Wandiga.

== Deaths ==
- 8 January – John Duckworth, British physicist (b. 1916).
- 20 January – Lawrence Hogben, New Zealand meteorologist and naval officer (b.1916).
- 27 January – Charles H. Townes, American Nobel Prize-winning physicist and contributor to the invention of the laser (b.1915).
- 25 February – Raymond Smallman, British metallurgist and academic (b. 1929).
- 4 April – Ioan Pușcaș, Romanian gastroenterologist (b. 1932).
- 23 May – John Forbes Nash, Jr., American mathematician, laureate of the Nobel Prize in Economics (1994), subject of A Beautiful Mind (b. 1928).
- 29 June – Joseph Bryan Nelson, British ornithologist and academic (b. 1932).
- 30 August – Oliver Sacks, British neurologist (b. 1933).
- 30 September – Guido Altarelli, Italian theoretical physicist (b. 1941).

== See also ==
- 2015 in paleontology
- 2015 in spaceflight
- List of emerging technologies
- List of years in science
- List of species described in 2015
