= DNA (disambiguation) =

DNA, or deoxyribonucleic acid, is a molecule that carries genetic information.

DNA or dna may also refer to:

== Companies ==
- DNA Films, a British film studio
- DNA Oyj, a Finnish telecommunications company
- DNA Productions, an American animation studio
- DNA Publications, an American publishing company
- DNA Studio, an American advertising agency
- Ginkgo Bioworks, a biotech company (NYSE stock symbol:DNA)
- Dan Air (Romania), a Romanian airline (ICAO code:DNA)
- DNA Music, a sub-label of the Philippine label Star Music

== Computing ==
- DIGITAL Network Architecture, DECnet's peer-to-peer networking architecture
- BitTorrent DNA, a download accelerator
- Windows DNA, a defunct predecessor of the Microsoft .NET Framework
- Direct Note Access, technology for music editing from Celemony Software
- DNA computing, computing using molecular biology hardware

== Entertainment ==
- Daily News and Analysis, an Indian broadsheet newspaper between 2005 and 2019
- DNA (1997 film), an American science fiction action film
- DNA (2020 film), a French drama film
- DNA (British TV series), a British television crime drama, aired in 2004 and 2006
- DNA (Danish TV series), a Danish television crime drama starring Anders W. Berthelsen, aired in 2019 and 2023
- "DNA" (Red Dwarf), a 1991 episode of Red Dwarf
- DNA (2024 film), a Malayalam-language crime thriller film
- DNA (2025 film), a Tamil-language crime action drama film
- Duet Night Abyss, a 2025 Chinese video game

== Literature ==
- DNA Magazine an Australian monthly magazine
- Les Dernières Nouvelles d'Alsace or Les DNA, a daily French newspaper
- DNA, a 2007 play by Dennis Kelly
- DnA, the joint pen name of Dan Abnett and Andy Lanning, British comic book writing duo

== Music ==
=== Bands ===
- DNA (American band), a no wave band
- DNA (duo), an electronic dance music duo
- DNA, a rock band formed in 1983 by Rick Derringer and Carmine Appice
- DNA, a Kazakh boy group under Juz Entertainment
- DNA (girl group), a Filipino P-pop girl group formed in 2025

=== Albums ===
- DNA (Backstreet Boys album) (2019)
- DNA (Wanessa Camargo album) (2011)
- DNA (Last Live at CBGB's) 1993 album by DNA
- D.N.A. (John Foxx album) (2010)
- DNA (Koda Kumi album) (2018)
- DNA (Little Mix album) (2012)
- D.N.A. (Mario album) (2009)
- DNA (Matthew Shipp and William Parker album) (1999)
- DNA (Trapt album) (2016)
- DNA (Ian Yates album) (2014)
- DNA (Ghali album) (2020)
- DNA, a 2019 album by Jeanette Biedermann
- DNA, a 2026 debut album by the Filipino girl group DNA

=== Songs ===
- "DNA" (BTS song) (2017)
- "DNA" (Empire of the Sun song) (2013)
- "D.N.A." (A Flock of Seagulls song) (1982)
- "DNA" (Kendrick Lamar song) (2017)
- "DNA" (Little Mix song) (2012)
- "DNA" (More than a Game), written by Andrea Bocelli, Ejae, Megan Thee Stallion, and produced by David Guetta for the 2026 FIFA World Cup album (2026)
- "DNA", by Craig David from 22 (2022)
- "DNA", by Danny Brown from XXX
- "DNA", by K.Flay from Solutions (2019)
- "DNA", by the Kills from Blood Pressures
- "DNA", written by Howard Benson, Lenard Skolnik, Lia Marie Johnson, and Sidnie Tipton and recorded by Lia Marie Johnson (2016)
- "DNA", by Rye Rye from Go! Pop! Bang!
- "DNA", by Wale from Shine
- "DNA", by Earl Sweatshirt eaturing Na-Kel from I Don't Like Shit, I Don't Go Outside
- "D/N/A", from the video game Hatsune Miku: Colorful Stage!

== Politics and government ==
- Democratic National Assembly, a political party in Trinidad and Tobago
- Det norske Arbeiderparti or Norwegian Labour Party
- National Anticorruption Directorate or Direcția Națională Anticorupție, a Romanian anti-corruption agency
- The National Assembly or De Nationale Assemblée, the parliament of Suriname
- Democratic – Neutral – Authentic, German: Demokratisch – Neutral – Authentisch, a right wing political party in Austria

== Other uses ==
- Corporate DNA, factors underlying and affecting organizational culture
- Z-DNA, one of the possible double helical structures of DNA
- DNA profiling, a technique used to identify individuals via DNA characteristics
- DNa inscription, an ancient inscription at the tomb of Darius the Great
- DNA Lounge, a nightclub in San Francisco, California, United States
- Dynamic network analysis, a scientific field in sociology and statistics
- Dynamic New Athletics, a team competition format in athletics
- DNA, an index herbariorum code in the FloraNT database
- DeNA, a mobile provider in Japan
- D.N.A.: Dark Native Apostle, a 2001 PS2 action game from Tamsoft
- DNA², a 1993 manga by Masakazu Katsura, subsequently adapted into an anime
- D.N.Angel, a 2003 manga/anime franchise by Yukiru Sugisaki
- DNAR or "do not attempt resuscitation", legal order to withhold cardiopulmonary resuscitation (CPR) or cardiac life support
- Did Not Attend, a motorsport term
- Upper Grand Valley Dani language, an ISO 639-3 code

== See also ==
- RNA (disambiguation)
