= Unsilent Night =

Performance art by Phil Kline

- by Phil Kline
- Album cover for Unsilent Night, available on Cantaloupe Music
- Genre: Musique concrète; performance art
- Composed: 1992
- Performed: 1992–present
- Scoring: Recorded sounds and electronics for boomboxes and other music-playing devices

Unsilent Night is a musical composition and participatory performance art piece by American composer Phil Kline which, since its creation in 1992, has been performed around the world annually in December. In the performance of this composition, volunteers carrying boomboxes and other music players parade through the streets of the participating city, presenting an ambient cacophony of recorded bells, harps, and electronic musical instruments composed by Kline. Considered Kline's most popular work to date, performances began in the New York City neighborhood of Greenwich Village and have since spread to 124 cities around the world, including the United States, Canada, Europe, Oceania, Africa, and Asia.

== Performance ==
In the performance of this work, each participant selects one of four audio tracks, like musical parts, to present during the parade. These audio tracks are offered free-of-charge to participants through the Unsilent Night mobile application and website. After meeting at their city's established starting point, all of the participants start playing their cassette tapes or audio files simultaneously, and then begin walking a predetermined route outdoors through the city. Throughout the performance, the audience (bystanders and participants) hear a soundscape of bells, harps, electronic instruments, and some references to Gregorian chant. The event lasts 45 minutes, the length of a cassette tape.

Each performance of Unsilent Night has differing environmental circumstances, like the number of participants, the chosen route through the city, the balance of its musical parts, and more; therefore, every performance is a unique experience. Some cities provide their own variations on the event, too; for example, Austin, Texas, performs Unsilent Night with its participants on bicycles. Furthermore, the sonic experience of this piece also changes based on the audience's location around or within the parade.

Unsilent Night is performed exclusively by the public in each participating city, but may be organized by independent organizations, municipalities, or volunteers.

== History ==
After graduating from Columbia University in the early 1970s, Kline began his career in music, performing in and composing for art-punk groups such as Dark Day, The Del-Byzanteens, and the Glenn Branca Ensemble. In the early 1990s, pushing his avant-garde compositions further, Kline began creating tape-based sound installations for collections of boomboxes inspired by the work of Brian Eno, Steve Reich, and Glenn Branca. The first of these was called Bachman's Warbler (1990), which was written for harmonicas and twelve boomboxes and premiered at Bang on a Can Marathon in New York City in 1992. The concept behind these pieces later contributed to Unsilent Night, which premiered in Greenwich Village in December 1992.

While Kline initially presented Unsilent Night using cassettes and boomboxes, in 2011 he released the Unsilent Night mobile application for Apple and Android devices and began hosting the piece's music on the official Unsilent Night website. In the performances following these additions, Unsilent Night participants have mainly used smartphones or MP3 players and speakers to perform this work. However, at the performances which Kline leads in-person (New York City and nearby locations), he still provides some early-arriving participants with vintage boomboxes from his own collection.

== Critical reception ==
Critical reception for both the Unsilent Night composition and its annual performance have been generally positive. NPR described Unsilent Night as an event that "transform[s] the coldest urban area with the warmth of musical fellowship". The Village Voice claimed that it is "a shimmering sound-wall of bells and chimes that is dreamlike to wander through in the December nip." Of the recorded CD version available on Cantaloupe Music, The New York Times stated that Unsilent Night "immerses the listener in suspended wonderment, as if time itself had paused inside a string of jingle bells."
