= Scott Crary =

American film director

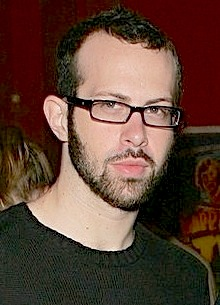
- Crary at the 2005 Tribeca Film Festival
- Born: Scott Aaron Crary; April 12, 1978 (age 48); Oahu, Hawaii, U.S.
- Other name: S. A. Crary
- Occupations: Director, producer, writer
- Years active: 2004–present
- Website: hungerartist.co

Scott Crary (also known as S. A. Crary; born 1978) is an American film director, producer and writer, best known for having directed, produced, filmed and edited the film Kill Your Idols, a documentary examining three decades of New York art punk bands.

== Film career ==
Crary's debut film, Kill Your Idols, features such noted no wave and art punk bands as Sonic Youth, Swans, DNA, Teenage Jesus and the Jerks, Suicide, Black Dice, Gogol Bordello, Yeah Yeah Yeahs, Liars, among others. The film received the award for Best Documentary at the 2004 Tribeca Film Festival and was subsequently screened at over 50 international film festivals, before being released theatrically in 2006. It was acquired for distribution in North America by Palm Pictures, in Europe by Minerva Pictures/RARO Video, and in Japan by Uplink. Kill Your Idols was also acquired for television by Showtime and Sundance Channel.

Crary served on the jury of the 2005 Tribeca Film Festival alongside Alan Cumming, Whoopi Goldberg, Darren Arronofsky, Tom Wolfe, Damon Dash, Jeff Bezos, and others.

In 2005, Nokia commissioned Crary to direct the short film Perdu Dans La Ville, shot entirely on Nokia 6682 Imaging Smartphones.

In 2007, Crary directed the music video for the song "Story Goes First" by the band Katamine. The video starred Kurt Feldman of the indie pop band The Pains of Being Pure at Heart.

In May 2008, Crary's film, Kill Your Idols, was named on Black Book Magazine's list of 'Iconic and Influential Music Documentaries', alongside such films as Dig!, I Am Trying to Break Your Heart: A Film About Wilco, 1991: The Year Punk Broke, Meeting People Is Easy, and The Devil and Daniel Johnston. In May 2011, the film was also included on Nylon Magazine's list of 'Top Music Documentaries'.

Crary produced the 2010 documentary film William S. Burroughs: A Man Within, featuring Iggy Pop, John Waters, Patti Smith, Gus Van Sant, David Cronenberg, Jello Biafra, John Giorno, Genesis P-Orridge, Laurie Anderson, and others. William S. Burroughs: A Man Within premiered at the 2010 Slamdance Film Festival and was acquired for distribution in North America by Oscilloscope Laboratories, in Australia by Madman Entertainment, in Germany by Neue Visionen, and in France by Arte.

In 2011, Crary produced an episode of the PBS series Independent Lens, hosted by America Ferrera.

In 2013, Crary's film, Kill Your Idols, was included in the permanent archives of The Rock and Roll Hall of Fame.

Crary served as a producer on the 2017 film Queercore: How to Punk a Revolution, a feature documentary on Queercore directed by Yony Leyser. The film features interviews with Bruce LaBruce, Kathleen Hanna, Kim Gordon, Rick Castro, John Waters, Peaches, Dennis Cooper, and others. Queercore: How to Punk a Revolution premiered at Sheffield Doc/Fest on June 12, 2017, and was acquired for television by Arte in France and by ZDF in Germany. It was announced on February 9, 2018, that all U.S. rights for the film had been acquired by distributor Altered Innocence. It was released theatrically on September 23, 2018, and on DVD, Blu-ray and VOD on January 8, 2019.

In 2018, Crary produced Fire Music, a feature documentary on free jazz, directed by Tom Surgal and featuring Cecil Taylor, Ornette Coleman, Prince Lasha, Carla Bley, Bobby Bradford, Sonny Simmons, and others. Fire Music premiered at the 56th New York Film Festival on September 29, 2018 and was released theatrically on September 10, 2021. The film was acquired by The Criterion Collection and released on VOD on June 1, 2022.

=== Upcoming projects ===
On January 3, 2019, Crary was announced as producer of an upcoming feature documentary on Jeffrey Lee Pierce and his band The Gun Club. The film, entitled Elvis From Hell, will feature original interviews with Nick Cave, Debbie Harry, Mick Harvey, Jim Jarmusch, Mark Lanegan, Moby, Kid Congo Powers, Jack White, and others.

== Other works ==
=== Advertising ===
In addition to his film work, Crary has been involved extensively in advertising as well, working with companies such as Nokia, Mazda, Guitar Center, Bacardi, Ray-Ban, The Contrarian Media, Apple, Seagram's Gin and others.

=== Art ===
Drowned Ophelia, an oil painting by Crary

Crary has been exhibited at numerous museums and art institutions internationally. His work has been presented at the Centre de Cultura Contemporània de Barcelona, the Musée d'art contemporain de Montréal, the Zeitgeist Multi-Disciplinary Arts Center in New Orleans, the Pera Museum in Istanbul, and London's Institute of Contemporary Arts. In 2005, Sight & Sound's Stephen Dalton characterized Crary's experimental video pieces as "short meditative loops" that "often deliver a kōan-like punchline."

=== Books ===
In 2020, Crary announced he had begun authoring "a book of illustrated short stories" called Children Remember. The title of the book is an allusion to the song of the same name by the band Circus Mort, which was fronted by Michael Gira who later formed Swans, a band featured in Crary's film Kill Your Idols.

On April 16, 2015, Crary previewed selections from a forthcoming conceptual photo book which depicts the former New York City residences of celebrated creative personalities, such as Jean-Michel Basquiat, William S. Burroughs, Diane Arbus, Bob Dylan, J.D. Salinger, Mark Rothko, Nico, and others.

=== Music ===
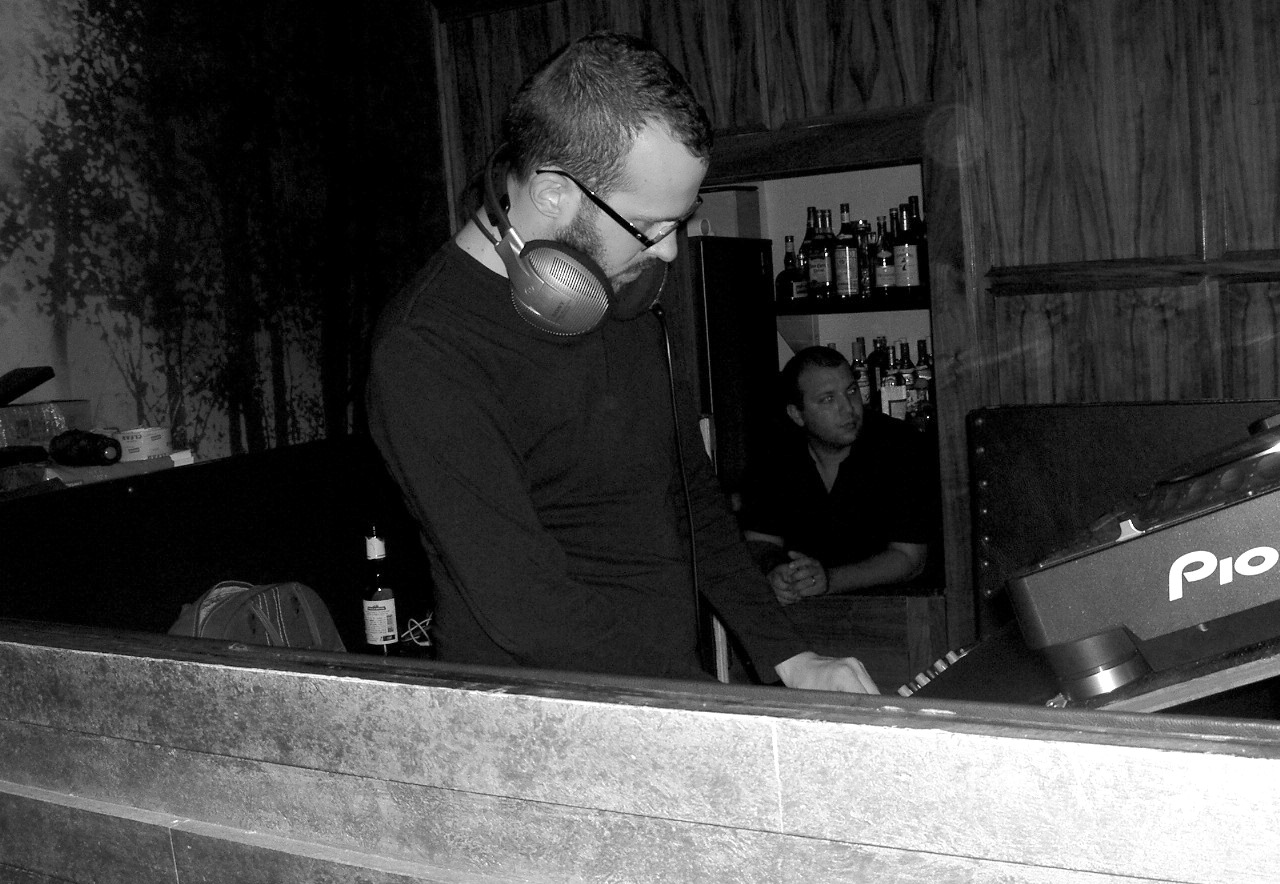
Crary performing as a DJ in 2006

Although more significantly known for his subsequent film work, Crary at first came to public attention in the mid to late 1990s as a hip-hop turntabilist, mixtape deejay and occasional producer, using the stage name DJ S.T.R.E.S.S. During this time, he performed as a supporting act on tours for such artists as De La Soul, Jungle Brothers, Smif-n-Wessun, Heltah Skeltah, and Chuck D of Public Enemy. He also released a number of self-produced mixtapes, which are notable for featuring some of the earliest appearances of artists like El-P, Mos Def, and Eminem, as well as original freestyles by The Roots, KRS-One, and Jeru The Damaja. As a member of the Universal Zulu Nation and an affiliate of the Native Tongues, Crary was associated with the consciousness movement in hip-hop.

== Influence ==
In 2006, the Belgian graphic design agency Kidnap Your Designer chose its name as a reference to Crary's film Kill Your Idols.

Footage of Crary's film Kill Your Idols was incorporated into the music video for the song "Window In The Skies" by the band U2.

In the 2011 novel Απόψε θα χιονίσει, θα το δεις, Greek author Daphne Manousou based the character of Edd on Crary.

In 2012, a bar named Kill Your Idol (in homage to Kill Your Idols) opened in Miami's South Beach neighborhood, promoting itself as "a throw back to the emerging No Wave movement of the late 70s." A framed poster of Crary's film hangs over the bar there.

In April 2012, artist Seth Kim-Cohen used Crary's film Kill Your Idols as a basis for his solo exhibition, Tomorrow Is The Question? Is the Question!, at the Audio Visual Arts (AVA) Gallery in New York.

Lydia Lunch credited Crary as the inspiration for her 2012-2013 "Retro/Virus" concert tour.

In 2013, Crary was included in the books Resonances: Noise and Contemporary Music, published by Bloomsbury Publishing, and The Music Documentary: Acid Rock to Electropop, published by Routledge.

Crary was included in the 2014 book Fight Back: Punk, Politics and Resistance, published by Manchester University Press.

In 2015, Crary was included in the book Tranquillo, non importa, published in Italy by Edizioni Sette Città.

In 2016, Crary was included in the book Downtown Manhattan 78-82: De la No Wave aux Dancefloors, published in France by Le Texte Vivant.

In February 2016, Norwegian band Karokh premiered the song "Boogies", inspired by Crary's film Kill Your Idols.

In 2017, Crary was included in the book Culturcide and Non-Identity across American Culture, published by Rowman & Littlefield.

In 2020, Crary was included in Jonathan Rhodes Lee's book Film Music in the Sound Era, published by Routledge.

== Personal life ==
Crary lives in the Brooklyn Heights neighborhood of New York City. He has a dog named Kafka, after the author Franz Kafka.

=== Family ===
Scott Crary is the great-great-great-great-grandson of 19th century poet and abolitionist Oringe Smith Crary.

He is also cousin to geophysicist and Arctic explorer Albert Paddock Crary, the first person to have set foot on both the North and South Poles.

== Filmography ==
=== Films ===
Year	Film	Functioned as					Notes
Year	Film	Director	Producer	Writer	Cinematographer	Editor	Notes
2004	Kill Your Idols	Yes	Yes	Yes	Yes	Yes	Awarded Best Documentary at the 2004 Tribeca Film Festival
2005	Perdu Dans La Ville	Yes		Yes	Yes	Yes	Short film. Produced in promotion with Nokia
2006	Huldufólk 102					Yes	
2006	Kill Your Idols: More.	Yes	Yes	Yes	Yes	Yes	Companion featurette released on the DVD of the 2004 film Kill Your Idols
2007	Berlin				Yes		Camera Operator
2008	Beautiful Losers						Consultant
2009	The Constant Dream of the Blinded Eye	Yes		Yes	Yes	Yes	Short film. Produced for Babelgum TV
2010	William S. Burroughs: A Man Within		Yes				Associate Producer
2011	Beats, Rhymes & Life: The Travels of a Tribe Called Quest						Special Thanks
2013	A Girl and a Gun				Yes		Additional Cinematography
2015	Stretch and Bobbito: Radio That Changed Lives						Special Thanks
2016	Offal	Yes	Yes	Yes	Yes	Yes	Companion featurette released on the DVD reissue of the 2004 film Kill Your Idols
2017	Queercore: How to Punk a Revolution		Yes				Consulting Producer / Executive Producer
2021	Fire Music		Yes				Co-Producer
TBA	Elvis From Hell		Yes				
TBA	The Sum of the Prey	Yes	Yes	Yes			Narrative film. In development

=== Television series ===
Year	Series	Functioned as			Notes
Year	Series	Director	Producer	Writer	Notes
2005	The Instant Talk Show	Yes		Yes	Co-director; Episode: "Pilot"; Guest starring Philip Seymour Hoffman and Ben Lee
2011	Independent Lens		Yes		Associate Producer; Episode: "Season 12, Episode 14"; Hosted by America Ferrera
2016	Vinyl				Music consultant; Episode: "Pilot"
TBA	Break North		Yes	Yes	In development

=== Music videos ===
Year	Song	Musician	Notes
2002	"Warsaw"	Cat Power	Director, cinematographer
2007	"Window in the Skies"	U2	Contributing Cinematographer
2007	"Story Goes First"	Katamine	Director, writer, cinematographer, editor

== Awards and accolades ==
- 2004—Winner, Best Feature Documentary at the Tribeca Film Festival for Kill Your Idols
- 2004—Nominated, Best Foreign Documentary at the São Paulo International Film Festival for Kill Your Idols
- 2006—Winner, Audience Award at the Camden International Film Festival for Huldufólk 102
- 2008—Kill Your Idols included on Black Book Magazine's list of 'Iconic and Influential Music Documentaries'
- 2010—Winner, Van Gogh Award for Best Biography at the International Documentary Film Festival Amsterdam for William S. Burroughs: A Man Within
- 2010—Winner, Gold Kahuna Award at the Honolulu Film Awards for William S. Burroughs: A Man Within
- 2010—William S. Burroughs: A Man Within named on Sight & Sound's Critics' Poll of the year's best films
- 2011—Kill Your Idols included on Nylon Magazine's list of 'Top Music Documentaries'
- 2013—Kill Your Idols included in The Rock and Roll Hall of Fame archives
- 2015—Kill Your Idols ranked at #5 on Taste of Cinema's list of 'Essential Punk Movies'
- 2016—Kill Your Idols ranked at #7 on Mafab Magazine's list of the '50 All-Time Best Music Movies'
- 2017—Winner, Felix Award at the Rio de Janeiro International Film Festival for Queercore: How to Punk a Revolution
- 2021—Fire Music named on Sight & Sound's Critics' Poll of the year's best films
