= RNA (disambiguation) =

RNA, or ribonucleic acid, is a family of large biological molecules.

RNA or rna may also refer to:

== Organizations ==
- RNA Society, a scientific society
- Religion News Association
- Republic of New Afrika, a black nationalist community and political lobby group
- Rochester Numismatic Association
- Rohingya National Army
- Romantic Novelists' Association
- The Royal National Agricultural and Industrial Association of Queensland, organiser of the Ekka
- The Royal Nepali Army, renamed the Nepali Army in 2008
- Royal Neighbors of America, an American fraternal order

== Other uses ==
- RNA (journal), a scientific journal
- Radio Nacional de Angola or Angola National Radio
- Ripley and New Albany Railroad, a Mississippi shortline railroad
- RNA Showgrounds, Brisbane, Australia
- Runa language, a former ISO 639-3 code

== See also ==
- DNA (disambiguation)
