= Dean Buonomano =

American neuroscientist and author

Dean Vincent Buonomano (born 1965) is an American neuroscientist and author. He is a professor at UCLA whose research focuses on neurocomputation and how the brain tells time. Buonomano has been described as one of the "first neuroscientists to begin to ask how the human brain encodes time" and has been published in various scientific journals. He is the author of two books, Brain Bugs: How the Brain's Flaws Shape our Lives and Your Brain is a Time Machine: The Neuroscience and Physics of Time. Buonomano's first book Brain Bugs examines the human brain's functional strengths and weaknesses, ultimately attributing some of the brain's 'bugs' (or flaws) to evolution.

== Early life ==
Buonomano was born in Rhode Island in 1965 and lived in Hamilton, Ontario, Canada before moving to Brazil at the age of 7 in 1972. Buonomano's younger sister was born in 1974 and he attributes her to being one of his first "test dummies" for his psychological experiments. An interview conducted by Anna Azvolinsky from The Scientist reported Buonomano's recollection of his childhood exploration in science stating, "One of my initial interests in neurobiology was a result of my big-brother experience, of witnessing a young brain develop. I saw my sister go from a baby that's vulnerable and helpless to a child making sense of the buzzing, sometimes confusing sensory world we live in." This initial childhood interest sparked his lifelong career and interest in the field of psychology and neurobiology.

== Education ==
After graduating from the State University of São Paulo, Campinas (UNICAMP) in Brazil, Buonomano attended graduate school at the University of Texas Graduate School of Biomedical Sciences at Houston, where he worked with John H. Byrne on synaptic plasticity and computational models of learning and memory. Buonomano's first published work was done with the help of Jack Byrne in 1990 "demonstrating that the synaptic plasticity of the pleural ganglion can be long-lived, lasting up to 24 hours." Buonomano then went on to join the University of California, San Francisco as a postdoctoral fellow working with Beverly Wright in Michael Merzenich's lab. His mentor, Michael Merzenich, focused research on synaptic plasticity and computational models of timing. This led to Buonomano's second published work in 1995 once again focusing on synaptic plasticity.

== Career and research ==
Buonomano's research focuses on how the brain tells time and processes temporal information. As the proposed mission statement posted on Buonomano Lab's mainpage states, "The primary goal of my laboratory is to understand how functional computations emerge from networks of neurons". He is a proponent of the theory that timing and temporal processing are so critical to brain function that most neural circuits are capable of telling time. He developed the influential theory that the brain tells time and processes temporal information not through an internal clock as scientists worldwide had previously theorized, but instead as a result of neural dynamics.

Buonomano is identified as one of the developers of general neurocomputational framework that he refers to as state-dependent networks or dynamic attractors, and others refer to as liquid state machines or reservoir computing. Buonomano Lab utilizes research methods such as computational modeling, in vitroelectrophysiology, optogenetics, and human psychophysics to conduct research observing how individual neurons and the brain as a whole perceive and respond to time. Buonomano's research has led to a number of experimental and theoretical contributions to the field of timing in the brain.^{[6]}

Buonomano joined the UCLA faculty in 1998 and has worked in the department of Behavioral Neuroscience there ever since. Buonomano is also a member of the Brain Research Institute at UCLA, Integrative Center for Learning and Memory at UCLA, Neuroengineering Training Program, and the current leading member of Buonomano Lab. Buonomano attributes the success of his research to keeping his lab team relatively small.

== Books ==
Dean Buonomano's first book, Brain Bugs: How the brain's flaws shape our lives, was originally published in July 2011.^{[9]} The book is written at a lower level and is part of the scientific genre. Buonomano's audience is mainly aimed at the general public for popular reads but also pulls in readers that are experts in the field of neuroscience. Brain Bugs has been widely reviewed in popular press such as Newsweek, Discover Magazine, Scientific American, The New Yorker, The Atlantic and Fresh Air (National Public Radio (NPR)). Buonomano was interviewed on the NPR talk show Fresh Air^{[11]} and participated in a dialogue about Brain Bugs at the Rubin Museum of Art with performance artist Laurie Anderson. He gave a talk about brain bugs at TEDx Vienna in 2017. Brain Bugs was also featured on The Wall Street Journal as a bestseller. Since its release, Brain Bugs is in libraries across the country and translated into three different languages.

Brain Bugs: How the brain's flaws shape our lives discusses Buonomano's main field of research, temporal processing, attributing much of our temporal processing to our method of memory storage. The New York Times Sunday Book Reviewer Christopher F. Chabris claimed although the idea of the brain having some major flaws was not necessarily a new finding, "Buonomano's focus on the mechanisms of memory, especially its 'associative architecture' as the main causes of the brain's bugs" is a new concept. Dean Buonomano illuminates the causes and consequences of these "bugs" in terms of the brain's innermost workings and their evolutionary purposes and ultimately both praises and criticizes the functions of the human brain arguing, "The human brain is the most complex device in the known universe, yet it is an imperfect one."

Buonomano mostly focus' on the human brain's memory storage methods with many examples of our brain's shortcomings. Buonomano points out glitches of the human brain such as our inability for mental long division or larger multiplication and our unreliable memory, especially in times of crises. By the same reasoning, Buonomano argues many of our external differences we observe between others fuels tendencies of distrust for people due to neural coding. Buonomano also highlights advertising companies that depend on the human brain's shortcomings to influence its judgment. Summarizing his work's relevancy, Buonomano states, "ultimately, who we are as individuals and as a society is defined not only by the astonishing capabilities of the brain but also by its flaws and limitations."

Buonomano's second book Your Brain is a Time Machine: The neuroscience and physics of time (Norton, 2017) was published in April 2017. The publisher Norton's synopsis states that Buonomano examines temporal processing of the brain, but with a new added element to his argument. Buonomano argues that our brains are "complex system that not only tells time but creates it".
