= John H. Byrne =

American neuroscientist

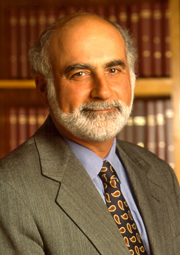
- Byrne in 2019
- Born: 1946
- Education: New York University Tandon School of Engineering
- Scientific career
- Fields: Neuroscience
- Thesis: Receptive Fields and Response Properties of Aplysia Mechanoreceptor Neurons (1973)
- Doctoral advisor: Eric Kandel
- Doctoral students: Dean Buonomano

John H. "Jack" Byrne (born 1946) an American neuroscientist, is the Virgil and June Waggoner Chair of Neurobiology and Anatomy at McGovern Medical School in Houston, Texas.

== Career and Research ==
After completing his Ph.D. at NYU, and a post-doctoral fellowship at Columbia, Byrne joined the faculty at the Department of Physiology at the University of Pittsburgh School of Medicine, where he investigated the ink motor reflex of Aplysia californica. In 1982, Byrne moved to Houston for a faculty position in the Department of Physiology and Cell Biology at McGovern Medical School of The University of Texas Health Science Center at Houston (UTHealth). Byrne served as professor and chair of the Department of Neurobiology and Anatomy at McGovern Medical School from 1987 to 2017. He is currently the director of the UTHealth Neuroscience Research Center.

Byrne’s research interests over the past 40 years have focused on elucidating the neural and molecular mechanisms of memory by exploiting the technical advantages of Aplysia californica. This animal exhibits a number of ubiquitous forms of learning such as classical conditioning and operant conditioning and has a simple nervous system with relatively large identified neurons, which facilitates the analyses. His lab uses an interdisciplinary approach that ranges from behavioral to molecular levels, including computational modeling and attempts to relate higher-level phenomena to lower-level mechanisms.

== Teaching ==
In collaboration with faculty in the Department of Neurobiology & Anatomy, Byrne et al., developed and launched Neuroscience Online: an Electronic Textbook for the Neurosciences, an Open-Access Electronic Textbook for the study of neuroscience. As a complement to Neuroscience Online, Byrne with the department of Neurobiology & Anatomy launched Neuroanatomy Online: an open-access electronic laboratory for the neurosciences.

John Byrne is the editor-in-chief for the Cold Spring Harbor Press journal Learning & Memory.

== Honors, awards, and memberships ==
- Elected Fellow, American Association for the Advancement of Science
- The University of Texas System Regent's Teaching Award
- International Neural Network Society Hebb Award
- Dana Foundation
- Society for Neuroscience
- Chair, NIH Study Section on Learning, Memory and Decision Neuroscience
