= Dan Braun =

American musician (born c. 1962)

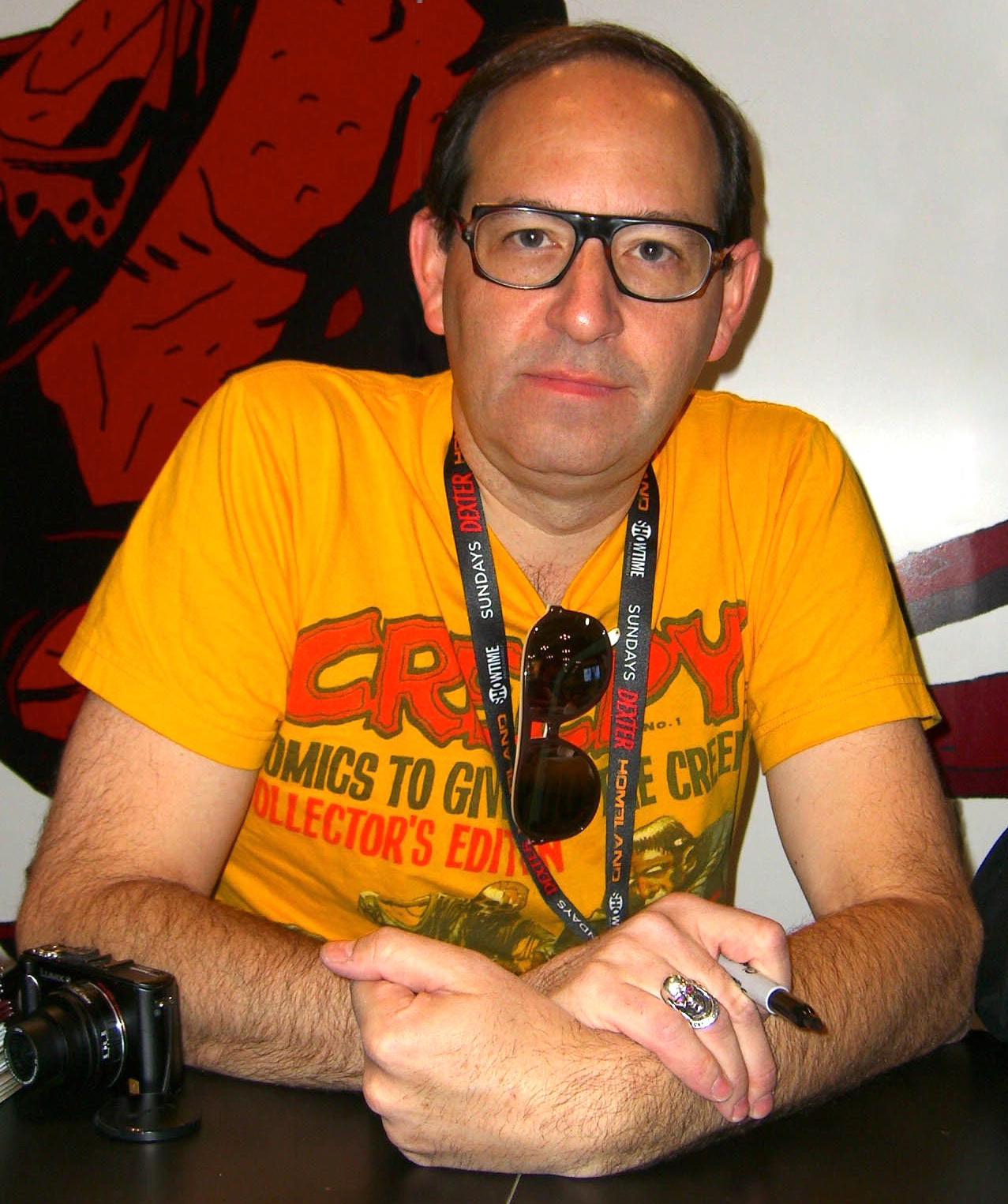
- Braun at the 2011 New York Comic Con

Background information
- Born: c. 1962 (age 63–64)
- Genres: Post-punk, no wave, industrial
- Occupations: Musician; artist; film producer

Dan Braun (born circa 1962) is an American musician, composer, writer, editor, art director, and film producer.

== Early music career ==
Dan Braun and his twin brother Josh have performed, separately and together, in bands including Circus Mort with singer Michael Gira; T-Venus (with Julia Heyward and Pat Irwin); The Del-Byzanteens (with future filmmaker Jim Jarmusch); and the Spinal Root Gang (with the future Madonna on lead vocals).

After recording one EP on Labor Records in 1981, Circus Mort broke up. Braun joined with Gira in the band Swans for a short stint in 1982, and was on the album Body to Body, Job to Job (1991). He went on to play with a myriad of New York bands and musicians including Robin Crutchfield, performance artist Julia Heyward, composer Pat Irwin, and with producer Lefferts Brown in the band Radio Firefight. The Braun brothers then joined The Del-Byzanteens, with Dan on drums. They recorded one album, Lies to Live By, and one single, "Draft Riot". Braun also toured and recorded with composer Glenn Branca on his Symphony #5. The Braun brothers formed their own band in 1982, Deep Six, with Rick Oller, Trey Sabitelli, and Tony Braun, their younger brother. Tony left the band and Phil Kline from The Del-Byzanteens joined on guitar. The band recorded one album, Garage D'or, on Twin Tone/Coyote Records in 1987 and in 1993 released one single on #1 Records, "Pretty White/Looking for a Reason".

== Advertising career ==
While still pursuing his musical career, Braun became a graphic designer in the world of advertising. He went on to become an art director, working on the Absolut Vodka campaign. Following the merger of TBWA and Chiat/Day, he was made creative director, overseeing Absolut's early internet experiments including "Absolut Panushka", an experimental animation site; "Absolut Kelly", focusing on the work of Kevin Kelly; and "Absolut DJ", a custom online DJ application that let consumers create "visual music" and interact with musical theorists like DJ Spooky and Coldcut.

== Submarine ==
In 1998, Braun and two partners launched Submarine, self-described as a "convergence programming studio". The studio's first project was "Absolut Director", which allowed users to create their own rescripted movies online. Spike Lee, Mary Harron, and Chris Smith were three of the directors who participated. The site won numerous advertising and web design awards.

Submarine Entertainment, formed in 2001, expanded the entertainment activities of the previous company and reunited the Braun twins as working partners. The company, which produces and develops feature films and documentaries, has represented and sold for distribution movies, including Eat That Question: Frank Zappa in his own words, Blackfish, Yo Yo Ma, The Music of Strangers, Life Animated, Danny Says, The Witness, Winter's Bone, Norman Lear: Just Another Version of You, The Wrecking Crew, Big Star: Nothing Can Hurt Me, NAS:Time is Illmatic, Muscle Shoals, Cutie and the Boxer, Chasing Ice, Super Size Me, Spellbound, The Cove, Tiny Furniture, and Joan Rivers: A Piece of Work, as well as several Academy Award for Best Documentary Feature winners, including 20 Feet From Stardom, Man on Wire, Searching for Sugarman and Citizenfour.

In 2011, the company began Submarine Deluxe as a theatrical releasing division of Submarine.

Braun was executive producer of the 2006 film Kill Your Idols, which won Best NY Documentary at the 2004 Tribeca Film Festival; the 2010 film Blank City, about 1970s experimental and no wave filmmakers; the 2014 film Sunshine Superman, about base jumping; and was a producer of the 2015 film Peggy Guggenheim: Art Addict, about art collector Peggy Guggenheim. Braun will executive produce the upcoming feature adaptation of "Batkid Begins" starring Julia Roberts.

Braun also produced and created web series The Instant Talk Show, with host Nick Scoullar, from 2005 to 2008.

== Creepy and Eerie relaunch ==
In 1999, the Braun brothers started pursuing rights to Warren Publishing's defunct horror-comics magazines Creepy and Eerie. With two partners, they formed the New Comic Company, which completed the acquisitions after a seven-year negotiation. In 2008, New Comic collaborated with Dark Horse Comics to release the reprint book series Creepy Archives. The first volume reached #2 on The New York Times Bestsellers list for graphic novels. In 2009, Braun and editor Shawna Gore won the Eisner Award for Best Archival Collection. In July 2009, New Comic and Dark Horse launched the quarterly color comic book Creepy with new material. Braun, the series' consulting editor, wrote the story "Hell Hound Blues" in issue #1. Soon after, a new Eerie comic-book series began.

Braun announced at the 2013 San Diego Comic Con that he and his brother, Josh, were developing a Creepy anthology movie with Chris Columbus and 1492 Pictures.
