= ViroCap =

ViroCap is a test announced in 2015 by researchers at Washington University in St. Louis which can detect most of the infectious viruses which affect both humans and animals. It was demonstrated to be as sensitive as the various Polymerase chain reaction assays for the viruses. The test examines two million sequences of genetic data from viruses. The research was published in September 2015 in the online journal Genome Research.

The researchers followed up their work in 2018, publishing comparisons between Metagenomic Shotgun Sequencing (MSS) and ViroCap.

ViroCap has since been utilised in a study conducted by the University Medical Center Utrecht, Utrecht, Netherlands in 2019.
