= Fire Music (film) =

- Theatrical release poster
- Directed by: Tom Surgal
- Written by: John Northrup; Tom Surgal
- Produced by: Peter Afterrman; Dan Braun; Josh Braun; Nels Cline; Scott Crary; Lin Culbertson; Ron Mann; John Loggia; Thurston Moore; Jeff Tweedy
- Starring: Rashied Ali; Carla Bley; Bobby Bradford; Gary Giddins; Tristan Honsinger; Prince Lasha; Ingrid Sertso; Sonny Simmons; Sirone
- Edited by: John Northrup
- Music by: Lin Culbertson
- Distributed by: The Criterion Collection
- Release dates: 29 September 2018 (NYFF); 10 September 2021 (Theatrical); 1 June 2022 (VOD)
- Running time: 88 minutes
- Country: United States
- Language: English

Fire Music is a 2021 documentary film directed by Tom Surgal about free jazz. The documentary focuses on the key innovators associated with the movement, including John Coltrane, Ornette Coleman, Cecil Taylor, Albert Ayler, Don Cherry, and Sun Ra.

== Release ==
An abbreviated rough cut of the film debuted at the New York Film Festival on September 29, 2018.

Fire Music was released theatrically on September 10, 2021.

The film was also acquired by The Criterion Collection and released on VOD on June 1, 2022.
