= RNA Society =

International society

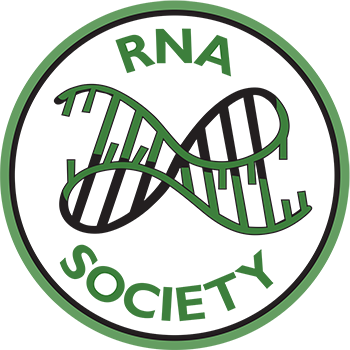
- Formation: 1993
- Official language: English
- President: Anna Marie Pyle
- Key people: Kristian Baker (CEO)
- Website: http://www.rnasociety.org/

The RNA Society is a non-profit, international scientific society that serves to facilitate the dissemination of scientific results and concepts in ribonucleic acid (RNA) research. The society was founded in 1993 and currently consists of over 1800 members.

== History ==
The RNA Society was founded in 1993. By Olke Uhlenbeck's account, the society spawned from a group of scientists studying RNA processing which first grew from a meeting at Brookhaven National Laboratory in 1974 and held annual meetings at Cold Spring Harbor starting in 1982. The society was formed for tax reasons following a surplus of money from a 1992 RNA processing meeting in Boulder, Colorado. The first president was Tom Cech, Joan Steitz was the first vice-president and president-"elect", Chris Greer was the first CEO, and Uhlenbeck was the first secretary/treasurer. In 2005, after more than 20 years of the society's existence, John Abelson deemed it a big success through its unique journal and annual meeting styles.

== Organization ==
The RNA Society is governed by an elected board of directors and a president, as well as an unelected CEO and CFO. Presidents and directors serve two-year terms; the current president is Anna Marie Pyle. In addition to these society officials, society affairs including the annual meeting and awards are accomplished by a number of chairs and committees.

Since 1995 the RNA society has facilitated the peer-reviewed journal RNA through Cold Spring Harbor Laboratory Press with the editor in chief being Timothy W. Nilsen. The society hosts annual meetings and since 2016 has funded RNA salons for regional meetings throughout the year. The society also gifts annual awards, including Travel Fellowships, a Young Scientist Award, Early- and Mid-career Awards, and the Elisa Izaurralde Award.

== See also ==
- RNA (journal)
- List of RNA biologists
- Protein Society
- American Society for Biochemistry and Molecular Biology
