= Kill Your Idols (film) =

2006 American documentary film

- Theatrical release poster
- Directed by: Scott Crary
- Produced by: Dan Braun; Josh Braun; Scott Crary
- Starring: Glenn Branca; Michael Gira; Eugene Hütz; Arto Lindsay; Lydia Lunch; Thurston Moore; Karen O Lee Ranaldo; Martin Rev; J.G. Thirlwell
- Distributed by: Palm Pictures
- Release date: July 7, 2006
- Running time: 75 minutes
- Country: United States
- Language: English

Kill Your Idols is a documentary film about three decades of art punk bands in New York City, directed and produced by Scott Crary and executive produced by Dan Braun and Josh Braun. The film debuted at the 2004 Tribeca Film Festival, where it won the award for Best Documentary.

== Structure ==
The documentary begins with a historical overview of the early art punk and no wave movements that originated in New York City in the 1970s. Through photos, archival performance footage and interviews with seminal bands like Suicide, Teenage Jesus and the Jerks, DNA, and Theoretical Girls, the inspirations for and ideologies of those movements are discussed as well as their subsequent influence on early 1980s post-punk bands like Sonic Youth, Swans, and Foetus. The film then jumps forward to 2002 to introduce bands emerging at that time that either claimed some affinity with the early art punk and no wave movements or were depicted as such by the media. Pitchfork writer Brandon Stosuy cites 2002 as the year when "the post-No New York moment bubbled most briskly." Crary uses this revival as a pretense to discuss notions of artistic influence and cultural nostalgia. Regarding his intentions for the film's thematic premise, Crary stated:

Of course the irony of a movement like No Wave, which sought to consciously rebuke what came before, eventually leaving a concentrated legacy of its own appealed to me. And the film became more about defining that irony than any sort of attempt at a historical document or overview.

— Scott Crary, Interview in Filmmaker Magazine

After offering brief surveys (through interviews and original performance footage) of bands like Yeah Yeah Yeahs, Liars, A.R.E. Weapons, Black Dice, Flux Information Sciences, and Gogol Bordello, the film then dramatically shifts tone, becoming an intergenerational dialectic between those emerging bands and the innovators of art punk and no wave introduced in the first part of the film, so as to contrast the past and the then present. The discussion culminates with thoughts from both generations on the changing music industry and how modern media's ubiquity can prematurely expose and corrupt burgeoning music scenes.

As Dorian Lynskey of Empire writes of the overall effect of the documentary: "Ostensibly about the ultra-obscure New York art-punk scene of 1977-82, this cleverly edited film is really a meditation on originality and nostalgia."

== Style ==
Kill Your Idols is notable for its complete lack of narration, instead relying only on abstract title cards and juxtapositional placement of interview soundbites to build a narrative arc. This results in what Rick Mele of The Cinema Source terms "a sort of minimalist and cynical expressionism," noting: "Crary splices together interviews so deftly and playfully that the different artists seem to continue each other's thoughts."

The documentary also makes considerable use of humor.

== Release ==
The film was acquired for distribution by Palm Pictures, premiering theatrically on July 7, 2006 and released on DVD on August 29, 2006.

The film was also acquired for television by Showtime and Sundance Channel.

== Critical reception ==
Kill Your Idols was released to mixed reviews. On Metacritic the film has a score of 52% based on 10 reviews.

Sight & Sound praised the film's "engagingly raw style", calling it "an enjoyable monument to an undervalued chapter in rock history." NME gave it 4 out of 5 stars, saying the film was "compelling stuff" and "thrillingly scratchy and lo-fi." Moviefone said the film "manages to leave even those who know nothing about punk feeling nostalgic for the passion and intelligence of its early days." TV Guide gave it 3 out of 4 stars, commending the film as a "sharp look at the crisis of innovation in an age of commodified nostalgia." However, both The New York Times and Entertainment Weekly criticized the film's inclusion of the more modern bands, with the former writing that "Crary never figures out what story he wants to tell" and the latter writing that the film "spends more time preaching about the anarchy of the good old days than it does revealing them."

Since its initial limited release, Kill Your Idols has gained popularity as a cult film, continuing to regularly screen at revival and repertory events internationally. The film was included on Black Book Magazine's 2008 list of 'Iconic and Influential Music Documentaries' and Nylon Magazine's 2011 list of 'Top Music Documentaries'. In 2013, the film was invited into the permanent archives of The Rock and Roll Hall of Fame.

== See also ==
- Art punk
- No wave
