= Fire Music =

Fire Music may refer to:

- Fire Music (Archie Shepp album), 1965
- Fire Music (Gallon Drunk album), 2002
- Fire Music (Danko Jones album), 2015
- Fire Music (film), a 2018 documentary film
