= DNA on DNA =

Compilation album by DNA
- Released: May 11, 2004
- Recorded: 1978–1982
- Genre: No wave
- Length: 62:47
- Label: No More
- Producer: Jason Gross, Alan Schneider

DNA chronology
DNA (Last Live at CBGB's) (1993)	DNA on DNA (2004)

Professional ratings
Review scores
Source	Rating
Pitchfork	8.1/10
Tiny Mix Tapes	4.5/5 stars
Tom Hull – on the Web	B+
The Village Voice	A−

DNA on DNA is a compilation album by DNA, released on May 11, 2004, through No More Records. Booklet liner notes written by Glenn O'Brien and Jason Gross.

== Track listing ==
No.	Title	Length
1.	"You & You"	2:07
2.	"Little Ants"	2:06
3.	"Egomaniac's Kiss"	2:11
4.	"Lionel"	2:08
5.	"Not Moving"	2:39
6.	"Size"	2:15
7.	"New Fast"	1:14
8.	"5:30"	1:04
9.	"Blonde Red Head"	1:52
10.	"32123"	0:54
11.	"New New"	2:49
12.	"Lying on the Sofa of Life"	1:52
13.	"Grapefruit"	5:00
14.	"Taking Kid to School"	1:31
15.	"Young Teenagers Talk Sex"	1:05
16.	"Delivering the Good"	2:09
17.	"Police Chase"	1:38
18.	"Cop Buys a Donut"	1:09
19.	"Detached (Early Version)"	1:45
20.	"Low"	1:56
21.	"Nearing"	2:14
22.	"5:30 (Early Version)"	1:54
23.	"Surrender"	3:48
24.	"Newest Fastest"	1:14
25.	"Detached"	1:20
26.	"Brand New"	2:13
27.	"Horse"	2:47
28.	"Forgery"	0:59
29.	"Action"	1:04
30.	"Marshall"	1:52
31.	"A New Low"	1:43
32.	"Calling to Phone"	2:15

== Personnel ==
=== DNA ===
- Arto Lindsay – guitar, vocals
- Ikue Mori – drums
- Tim Wright – bass guitar (7–18, 24–32)
- Robin Crutchfield – organ (1–6, 19–23), vocals (5, 21, 23, 25)

=== Production and additional personnel ===
- Chris Flam – mastering
- Jason Gross – production
- Alan Schneider – production
