= Queercore: How to Punk a Revolution =

- Theatrical release poster
- Directed by: Yony Leyser
- Written by: Yony Leyser
- Produced by: Nina Berfelde; Scott Crary; Thomas Janze; Yony Leyser
- Starring: Lynn Breedlove; Kim Gordon; Kathleen Hanna; Silas Howard; G.B. Jones; Bruce LaBruce; Genesis P-Orridge; Peaches; John Waters
- Music by: Hyenaz
- Distributed by: Altered Innocence; Arte; Edition Salzgeber
- Release date: 2017
- Running time: 83 minutes
- Country: Germany
- Language: English

Queercore: How to Punk a Revolution is a 2017 English-language German documentary film directed by Yony Leyser about the social and cultural movement known as Queercore. The documentary focuses on the movement's diverse elements, including zine culture, music, film, and activism.

== Release ==
The film debuted at the Sheffield Doc/Fest on June 12, 2017 and was acquired for distribution in Europe by Edition Salzgeber. It was also acquired for television by Arte in France and by ZDF in Germany.

It was announced on February 9, 2018 that all U.S. rights for the film had been acquired by distributor Altered Innocence, with a U.S. theatrical release planned for late 2018. The film premiered theatrically on September 23, 2018 and was released on DVD, Blu-ray and VOD on January 8, 2019.
