= Cold Spring Harbor Protocols =

- CSH Protocols logo
- Discipline: Biology
- Language: English
- Edited by: Alejandro Montenegro-Montero

Publication details
- Former name(s): CSH Protocols
- History: 2006–present
- Publisher: Cold Spring Harbor Laboratory Press
- Frequency: Monthly

Standard abbreviations
- ISO 4: Cold Spring Harb. Protoc.

Indexing
- ISSN: 1940-3402 (print); 1559-6095 (web)

Links
- Journal homepage

Cold Spring Harbor Protocols (formerly CSH Protocols) is an online scientific journal and methods database for biologists, published by Cold Spring Harbor Laboratory Press. Protocols are presented step-by-step and edited in the style that has made Molecular Cloning, Antibodies, Cells and many other CSH manuals essential to the work of scientists worldwide. Protocols in the database come from CSH manuals, courses taught at Cold Spring Harbor Laboratory, and newly submitted methods from the scientific community. The journal was launched in June 2006.

== See also ==
- Cold Spring Harbor Laboratory Press
- Cold Spring Harbor Laboratory
- Protocol (natural sciences)
