= Josh Braun =

American film producer (born 1961)

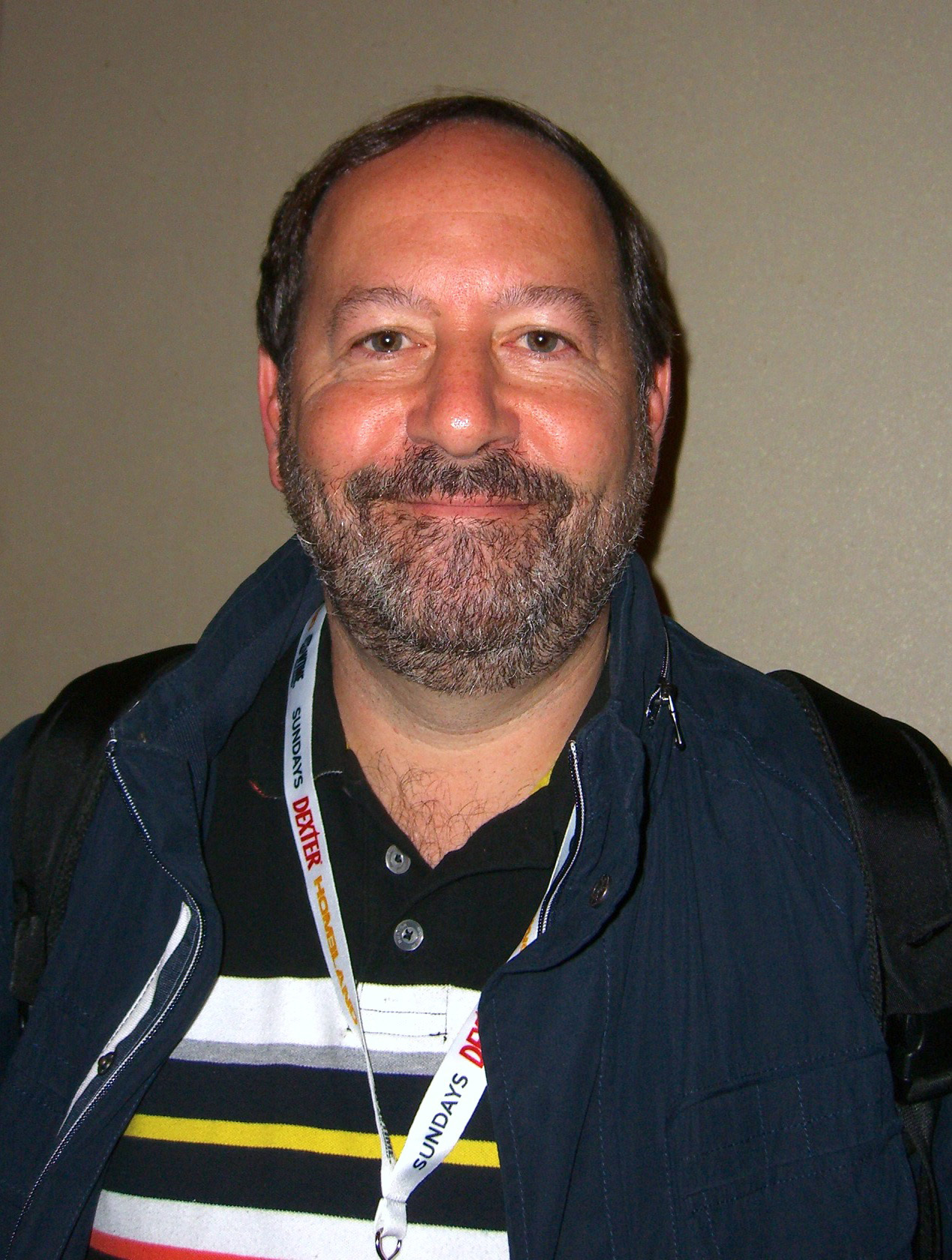
- Braun at the 2012 New York Comic Con
- Born: 1961 (age 64–65)
- Occupations: Businessperson film producer musician comics publisher
- Website: www.submarine.com

Josh Braun (born 1961) is an American businessperson, film producer, musician and comics publisher known for his work in the bands Circus Mort and The Del-Byzanteens, for his formation in the companies Submarine Entertainment, and New Comic Co., the latter of which is responsible for republishing the horror comics Creepy and Eerie.

== Early life ==
Braun and his twin brother Dan grew up in New York City in the 1960s and became fans of horror publications like Creepy and Eerie at a young age, on which they would spend their allowances.

== Career ==
The Brauns began careers in advertising and TV. They became reacquainted with their childhood reads at weekend flea markets.

The Brauns started the post-punk/no wave band Circus Mort with Rick Oller and Michael Gira, who later went on to form Swans. After the break-up of Circus Mort, Josh and Dan joined The Del-Byzanteens, a No Wave band featuring filmmaker Jim Jarmusch on vocals and keyboards.

From 1991 to 1999 Braun worked with Fremantle Media as Senior Vice President and head of sales, where he was responsible for the sales, production, and acquisitions of such programs as The Anti Gravity Room, Baywatch, All My Children, Third Rock from the Sun, South Park, The Price Is Right, and many others.

In 1999, they set out to buy the rights to the forgotten titles, which they felt there could market into revived brands that could be adapted into feature films, television, broadband shorts, Broadway shows, and licensed properties. The Brauns formed New Comic Co. to buy the rights to the Creepy and Eerie, a transaction that took seven years to complete. In 2008, New Comic struck a deal with Dark Horse Comics to publish Creepy Archives, the first in a series of reissues. Though Brauns expected to sell 5,000 copies, given the $49 price, it sold three times that amount. In 2009, the first of the Eerie Archives reached No. 2 on The New York Times graphic novels bestseller list. The company eventually launched New Creepy Comic Book, which introduced an extended family of Creepy characters. In 2009 the Creepy Archives series won the Eisner Award for Best Archival Comic Book Collection. In July 2009, an all-new biannual Creepy comic was released, featuring work from comic book artists Bernie Wrightson and Angelo Torres.

In 2001 Josh and Dan formed Submarine Entertainment, a company that represents, produces, and develops feature films and documentaries including Winter's Bone (2010 Sundance Grand Jury Prize winner), Man on Wire (2009 Academy Award winner, Best Documentary), The Cove (2010 Academy Award winner, Best Documentary), Werner Herzog's Cave of Forgotten Dreams and Encounters at the End of the World, Joan Rivers: A Piece of Work, Winnebago Man, Spellbound, Super Size Me, and Food, Inc.. Variety listed Submarine Entertainment as one of the top film reps in the business.

Braun produced the 2009 feature film The House of the Devil and executive produced David Cronenberg's A History of Violence and Scott Crary's Kill Your Idols.
