= John Gavanti =

Studio album by members of Mars and DNA
- Released: 1980
- Recorded: 1980
- Genres: No wave, experimental music
- Labels: Hyrax (original LP); Atavistic (CD reissue)

John Gavanti is a 1980 no wave opera album by members of the band Mars and a member of DNA. It was written by Sumner Crane (of Mars), and played by the former plus Mark Cunningham (of Mars), China Burg (of Mars) and Ikue Mori (of DNA). Arto Lindsay (of DNA) and his brother Duncan Lindsay also participated in the recording sessions. All were prominent members of New York City's short-lived No Wave music scene.

The opera is a loose retelling of Mozart's 1787 opera Don Giovanni, which in turn is based on the legend of Don Juan. The title character is a libidinous figure endowed with magical powers, and the songs of the opera follow him on a series of adventures, many of them involving the pursuit of various females, including a female lion, a young girl, and a grandmother "in the beautiful autumn of life."

== Description ==
Cunningham wrote about the project on his personal website:

"John Gavanti was, in a sense, a band, as we spent over a year developing and rehearsing the work. It consisted of Sumner Crane, the author of the libretto and songs, Don Burg, alter ego of China Burg, and myself as well as Ikue Mori from DNA. In the recording sessions we also used Arto Lindsay and his brother Duncan on garbage lid percussion for a samba takeoff. Sumner played guitar and piano, Don bass clarinet and I managed to get in trumpet, trombone, baritone horn and tuba. Ikue played the viola and cello. Neither she nor Lucy had ever touched those instruments before. Sumner called the shots generally but the arrangements were collective improvs. We recorded it in NY at Sear Sound, an all vacuum tube studio later popularized by Sonic Youth. It was released on my own label Hyrax in 1980, and sold over the years almost all the 3000 vinyl copies printed. It's now been reissued as a CD on Atavistic.

In the early eighties, some crazy Italian fans made a video of the whole opera which was really quite amazing; we figured the only way to represent it would be a big budget film, but they did it with no budget, an all male cast and lots of energy and humor. Unfortunately finding a copy is probably next to impossible."

== Reviews ==
Professional ratings
Review scores
| Source | Rating |
|---|---|
| Allmusic | (?) |

Glenn Kenny of Trouser Press wrote of John Gavanti: "Some have called this the most unlistenable record ever made, and that's a fine invitation indeed."

== Track listing ==
All tracks composed by Sumner Crane.

1. "Overture"
2. "I Awake"
3. "Down To The Ocean"
4. "On Board Ship"
5. "Gavanti Samba"
6. "Lo! La!"
7. "O Ancient Ocean"
8. "New York Blues"
9. "Higher And Higher"
10. "Africa"
11. "Mirror Mirror"
12. "Venice/ Locus Solus"
13. "Gavanti's Lament"
14. "Homeward Bound"
