= Nancy Arlen =

American sculptor (1942–2006)

Nancy Arlen on back of No New York LP cover 1978

Nancy Arlen (January 29, 1942 – September 17, 2006) was a cast polyester resin sculptor and drummer for the no wave band Mars.

== Art ==
In the 1970s, Arlen as a sculptor showed her cast-polyester abstractions at Robert Steffanotti Gallery. She also showed at the New Museum. Arlen found her working materials at the plastic shops of Canal Street (Manhattan). Arlen made a series of glass works in 1983.

== Music ==
Arlen played drums for Mars, one of New York’s original No Wave bands.

Mars played live about two dozen times, all in Manhattan. Their first show was at CBGB's in January 1977; their last one was at Max's Kansas City on December 10, 1978. Their recorded debut was the "3-E"/ "11,000 Volts" 7-inch single, released by Rebel Records/ ZE Records. The group then released a single live EP in 1979 or 1980, though they had broken up in 1978. Both recordings were compiled by Lydia Lunch's self-run label, Widowspeak Records, in 1986, as 78; the songs were slightly remixed and tweaked by Jim Thirlwell (a.k.a. Foetus). It was reissued by Atavistic Records on CD in 1996 as 78+.

In 1978, Mars appeared on the influential No New York compilation LP produced by Brian Eno, along with DNA, Teenage Jesus and the Jerks, and James Chance and the Contortions, which helped to bring the nascent No Wave genre into the foreground.
