= William S. Burroughs: A Man Within =

- Theatrical release poster
- Directed by: Yony Leyser
- Written by: Yony Leyser
- Produced by: Carmine Cervi; Scott Crary; Ilko Davidov; Yony Leyser
- Starring: Laurie Anderson; Jello Biafra; David Cronenberg; John Giorno; Thurston Moore; Genesis P-Orridge; Iggy Pop; Patti Smith; Gus Van Sant; John Waters
- Distributed by: Oscilloscope Laboratories
- Release date: November 17, 2010
- Running time: 87 minutes
- Country: United States
- Language: English

William S. Burroughs: A Man Within is a 2010 independent American documentary film directed by Yony Leyser about William S. Burroughs, featuring previously unreleased footage and interviews with his friends and colleagues.

The film uses archival footage and interviews with John Waters, Patti Smith, Iggy Pop, Gus Van Sant, Genesis Breyer P-Orridge, Sonic Youth, Laurie Anderson, Amiri Baraka, Jello Biafra, and David Cronenberg. The film is narrated by Peter Weller, with a soundtrack by Patti Smith and Sonic Youth.

== History ==
The conception of William S. Burroughs: A Man Within started in Lawrence, Kansas in 2005. Director Yony Leyser was expelled from CalArts and moved to Kansas. Leyser wrote an article, "From Beatnik to Anarchist: Radical Eruptions in Lawrence." He mentioned Burroughs in the article, got in touch with people from the estate, and then met several of Burroughs' friends.

Leyser also derived material from James Grauerholz. To Burroughs, Grauerholz had been "his fan, his live-in boyfriend, his otherwise-romantically-coupled secretary and friend, his tour booker and road manager, his personal editor, etc, etc.."

Leyser collected material by interviewing friends of Burroughs, and people who had been inspired by him.

== Release ==
The film was released on Adam Yauch's Oscilloscope Pictures. It premiered at the Slamdance Film Festival in Utah, and has been featured on PBS Independent Lens.

=== Critical reception ===
The film was a Critic's Pick of The New York Times; Stephen Holden says, "“A Man Within” is embellished with scratchy line drawing that evokes Burroughs’s skeletal vision of humanity. There is not a word or image wasted in a documentary you wish ran an extra half-hour beyond its condensed 90 minutes."

John Anderson of Variety writes, "Leyser is clearly a Burroughs acolyte, and he taps into the man's sensibility: The abstract stop-motion animation by Aimee Goguen and Dillon Markey creates aptly crazy interludes between interviews and archival bits, which include avant-garde movies Burroughs made when was a relative youth (even if he never quite looked like one). There is a wealth of anecdotal material. Like his subject, Leyser strives to disengage from the conventional, while still being lucid. He succeeds admirably."

Sheri Linden of the Los Angeles Times says, "Digging for psychological understanding, Leyser doesn't parse the literary work itself, letting recordings of Burroughs suffice — not a bad decision..." and calls the film an "intimate and moving portrait it paints."

V.A. Musetto of the New York Post calls the film "reverential and entertaining," and notes that the film includes previously unseen and rare footage from VHS tapes donated by William S. Burrough's friends.

"Offers a concise summary of Burroughs' life and works. Maybe too concise. At a mere 88 minutes, it feels a bit glancing. But as an introduction or refresher course, it gets the job done," writes Keith Phipps, of the Onion's A.V. Club. He rated the film a B−, while the overall community rating at the A.V. Club is an A.

Bill Stamets of the Chicago Sun-Times gave William S. Burroughs: A Man Within three stars.

William Fowler of Sight and Sound magazine says, "Formally and structurally conventional, this documentary is also rich, compelling and filled with reflections that are both articulate and emotionally sensitive."

On the review aggregator website Rotten Tomatoes, 88% of 17 critics' reviews are positive..

=== Awards ===
William S. Burroughs: A Man Within won the Van Gogh Award for Best Biography, Amsterdam International Film Festival, the Netherlands, along with the Gold Kahuna Award, Honolulu International Film Festival, Hawaii. The film was named as one of 2010's top 10 movies by Sight and Sound Magazine.

The film was an Official Selection at the 2010 Chicago International Movies and Music Festival, the Sao Paul International Film Festival, the Seattle International Film Festival, the Sarasota Film Festival, the Maryland Film Festival, the Vienna International Film Festival, and the Jameson Dublin International Film Festival.

== Soundtrack ==
The soundtrack is by Sonic Youth and Patti Smith.
