= Phil Kline =

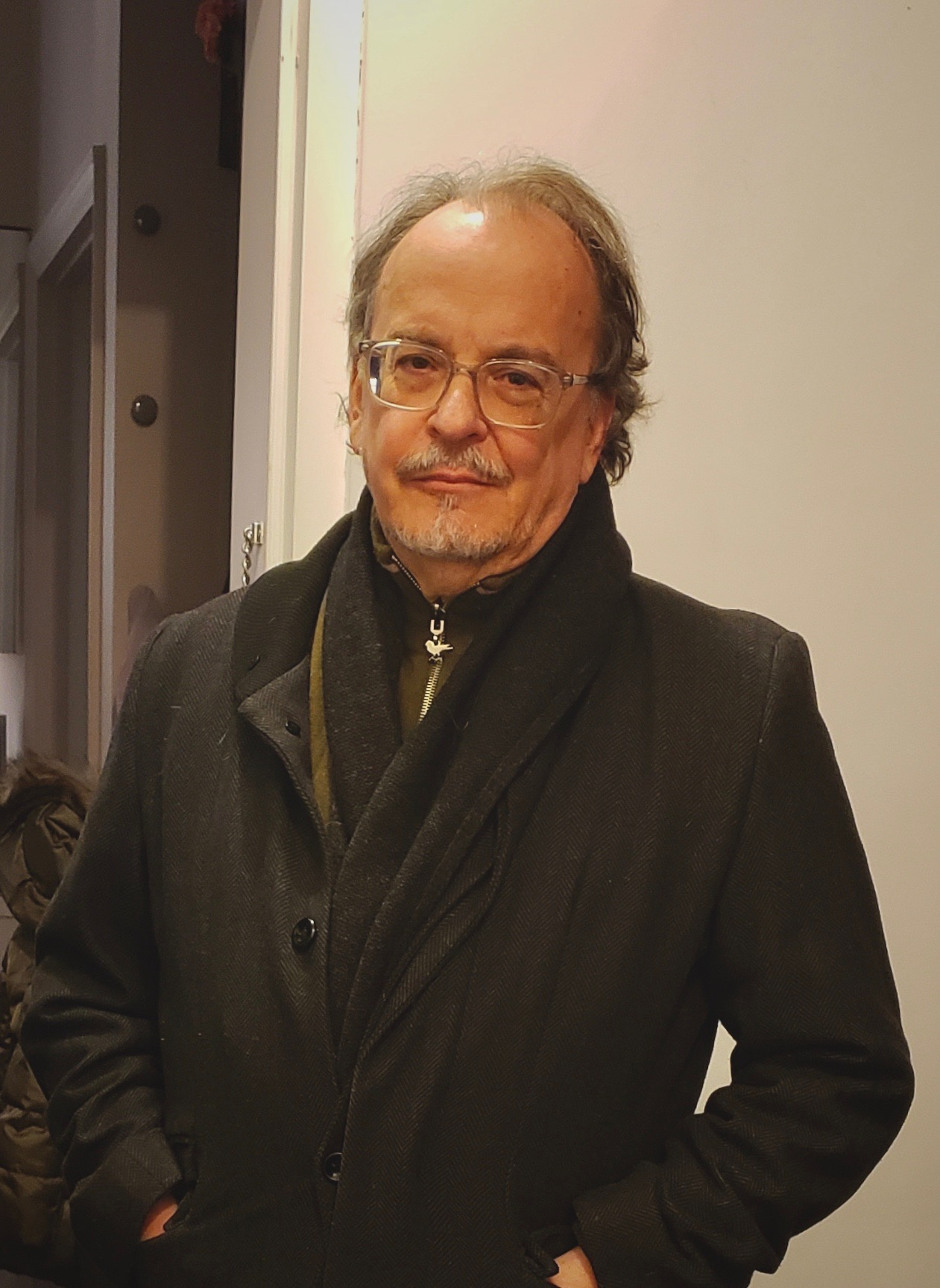
- Kline after a performance of his Unsilent Night in New York City, December 2018.

Background information
- Born: Akron, Ohio
- Genres: contemporary classical, performance art, experimental, art punk,
- Occupations: Composer, sound artist, performer
- Years active: 1982–present
- Label: Cantaloupe Music
- Website: philkline.com

Phil Kline (born 1953) is an American composer, sound artist, and performer most recognized for his Unsilent Night (1992) and Zippo Songs (2004). Beginning as a guitarist and singer in the New York City art punk scene, Kline has since gained notability through his song cycles and theatrical works, musical performance art pieces, work with Bang on a Can, and WQXR's online new-music radio show. With five studio albums to date, a majority of his compositional work can be found on Cantaloupe Music.

== Education and early works ==
Kline was born in 1953 and grew up in Akron, Ohio. After moving to New York City to pursue a degree in English literature from Columbia University and graduating in 1975, he attended Mannes College of Music. In the late 1970s, Kline began his career as a full-time musician and first joined the band Dark Day with Robin Crutchfield (also of the band DNA). When he left Dark Day, he co-founded the no-wave, art-punk band The Del-Byzanteens alongside filmmaker Jim Jarmusch, author Lucy Sante, and painter James Nares. After these projects, he also toured internationally and recorded with the Glenn Branca Ensemble and began assisting with video projects by Nan Goldin.

== Career ==
As a continuation of his experimental work, Kline began creating tape-based sound installations for collections of boomboxes inspired by the work of Brian Eno, Steve Reich, and Glenn Branca. The first of these was called Bachman's Warbler (1990), which was written for harmonicas and twelve boomboxes and premiered at the Bang on a Can Marathon in New York City in 1992. The concept behind these pieces later contributed to his Unsilent Night (1992), which has since brought Kline worldwide recognition.

First performed in New York City, Unsilent Night is an annual public performance piece in which anyone may participate. Every December, as part of this performance, a volunteer parade carrying boomboxes and other music players passes through Greenwich Village, presenting an ambient cacophony made of recorded bells, harps, and electronic instruments to the neighborhood. While Unsilent Night features musical references to ancient Christmas music, the piece itself and its performance are not religion-specific. Since its premiere in 1992, the Unsilent Night tradition has spread to over 116 cities around the world, mostly in the United States and Canada, but also to major cities across Europe, Oceania, Africa, and Asia.

Kline's other notable work primarily includes song cycles and opera. Kline's song cycles have historically had political themes, such as his Three Rumsfeld Songs, which borrow text from the Pentagon briefings of Secretary of Defense Donald Rumsfeld following the September 11 terrorist attacks and during the War in Iraq. The source for Kline's Zippo Songs (2004), the song cycle for which he is best known, comes from US government-issued Zippo Lighters from the Vietnam War, on which some soldiers etched short sayings or poems. These sayings and poems, compiled into Zippo Songs, therefore offers a lens into the social, spiritual, sexual, and emotional lives of these American Vietnam War soldiers. Zippo Songs was written for singer Theo Bleckmann, as well as for violin, percussion, and guitar. Kline's lounge-inspired, staged song cycle Out Cold (2012)—about the desperation of lost love—was also written for and performed by Bleckmann.

More recently, Kline has delved into the opera genre with his Tesla, which explores the life and works of inventor Nikola Tesla in collaboration with filmmaker Jim Jarmusch, a colleague from their band, The Del-Byzanteens. Kline has also written music for dance and ballet, such as his work for the Birmingham Royal Ballet.

Other than these projects, Kline's work includes continuing commissions from Bang on a Can, American Opera Projects, the Brooklyn Youth Chorus, WNYC, the New York State Council on the Arts, Ethel and Alice Tully Hall at Lincoln Center, Jennifer Koh, Muzik3, the La Jolla Symphony Orchestra, the St. Luke's Chamber Ensemble, and for the Kotschmar Memorial Organ in Portland, Maine. Furthermore, his works have had performances at venues across the world including, Lincoln Center, the Barbican Centre, the Amsterdam Royal Concertgebouw, the Brooklyn Academy of Music, the Royal Conservatory of Music of Toronto, The Whitney Museum, the Cleveland Museum of Art, the Kimmel Center, Trinity Church, Symphony Space, National Sawdust, The Kitchen, and the Badlands National Park.

== Critical reception ==
Throughout his career, Phil Kline's music has been respected for its experimental nature. The New York Times describes it as having "the tonal richness of Barber, the austerity of Stravinsky, and the harmonic piquancy of Ligeti," and New York magazine has said that Kline "long ago declared independence from any musical Establishment."

Kline's Unsilent Night has been called "a magical musical parade," “a tribute to the joy of caroling" (The Village Voice), and "an ethereal sound sculpture" (The Guardian); it's been noted for the "benign sense of wonder it instilled in observers" (San Francisco Chronicle).

Furthermore, although Brian Olewnick (The Squid's Ear) said that Kline's Zippo Songs has a "lack of memorability," Alex Ross (The New Yorker, The Rest is Noise) described this collection as "one of the most brutally frank song cycles ever penned," and Anne Midgette for The New York Times described it as "brilliant American lieder for the 21st century."

Kline's contemporary adaptation of the Catholic Mass, John the Revelator (2006), was called "offbeat" and "moving" (The New York Times), and AllMusic called it "easily one of the most moving and engaging mass settings in recent memory."

== Discography ==
Studio Albums
Title	Label	Year
John the Revelator	Cantaloupe Music	2009
Around the World in a Daze	Starkland	2009
Zippo Songs	Cantaloupe Music	2004
Unsilent Night	Cantaloupe Music	2001
Glow in the Dark	Composers Recordings, Inc.	1998
Emergency Music	Composers Recordings, Inc.	1997

Compilation Albums
Title	Track	Label	Year
Messiah Remix	"Hallelujah!”	Cantaloupe Music	2004
Ethel	"Blue Room and Other Stories"	Cantaloupe Music	2003
Renegade Heaven	"Exquisite Corpses"	Cantaloupe Music	2001
Immersion	"The Housatonic at Henry Street"	Starkland	2000
The Alternative Schubertiade	"Franz in the Underworld”	Composers Recordings, Inc.	1999
New York Guitars	"Fantasy on One Note”	Composers Recordings, Inc.	1996
Bang on a Can Vol. 2	"Bachman's Warbler”	Composers Recordings, Inc.	1993
