= Learning & Memory =

- Discipline: Neurobiology of learning and memory
- Language: English
- Edited by: John H. Byrne

Publication details
- History: 1994-present
- Publisher: Cold Spring Harbor Laboratory Press
- Frequency: Monthly
- Open access: Hybrid and delayed, after 12 months
- License: CC BY-NC/CC BY
- Impact factor: 1.8 (2023)

Standard abbreviations
- ISO 4: Learn. Mem.

Indexing
- CODEN: LEMEFO
- ISSN: 1072-0502 (print); 1549-5485 (web)
- LCCN: 94660978
- OCLC no.: 56123340

Links
- Journal homepage; Online access; Online archive

Learning & Memory is a monthly peer-reviewed scientific journal covering the neurobiology of learning and memory. It was established in 1994 and is published by Cold Spring Harbor Laboratory Press. The editor-in-chief is John H. Byrne (University of Texas Health Science Center at Houston).

== Abstracting and indexing ==
The journal is abstracted and indexed in the Science Citation Index, Current Contents/Life Sciences, The Zoological Record, BIOSIS Previews, PsycINFO, Scopus, and Index Medicus/MEDLINE/PubMed. According to the Journal Citation Reports, the journal has a 2023 impact factor of 1.8.
