= Lies to Live By =

Studio album by The Del-Byzanteens
- Released: 1982
- Studio: Sorcerer Studios
- Genre: New Wave
- Length: 31:09
- Label: Don't Fall Off the Mountain
- Producer: Charlie Walden, The Del-Byzanteens

Lies to Live By is the sole studio album by American band The Del-Byzanteens, released in 1982 by record label Don't Fall Off the Mountain.

== Music ==
"Draft Riot" features a "hyper-disco" beat and quirky guitar sounds that have been compared to the B-52's.

"War" is a protest song in a funk punk style with "lyrics from Caribbean calypso records."

"Sally Go Round the Roses" is in a "tray soul of the old Jaynettes' shuffle."

== Track listing ==
1. Lies To Live By - 3:57
2. Draft Riot - 3:25
3. War - 2:58
4. Sally Go Round the Roses - 4:30
5. Girls Imagination - 6:03
6. Welcome Machines - 4:29
7. Apartment 13 - 5:47

== Reception ==
Hot Press called the album "a debut equal to anything out of New York these past six years", and Melody Maker described it as "mighty stuff... You are strongly urged to investigate this record... outstanding." Tiny Mix Tapes called it a "great one-time album".
