= Circus Mort =

American post-punk band

- Also known as: Metal Envelope; The Circus Morticians
- Genres: Post-punk
- Years active: 1979–1981
- Label: Labor
- Spinoffs: Swans; The Del-Byzanteens
- Past members: Michael Gira; Rick Oller; Dan Braun; Josh Braun; Angelo Pudignano; Mike Pedulla; Jonathan Kane

Circus Mort was an American post-punk band formed in late 1979 in New York City by future Swans vocalist Michael Gira and guitarist Rick Oller. Twin brothers Dan and Josh Braun were recruited on bass and keyboard, respectively. The band cycled through three different drummers: Angelo Pudignano, Mike Pedulla, and Jonathan Kane (also later of Swans). Circus Mort recorded only one EP, a self-titled effort on Labor Records, before disbanding in 1981.

== History ==
According to Oller, shortly after he and Gira moved from Los Angeles to New York CIty in 1979, they met Contortions bassist Don Christensen, who invited them to practice in his rehearsal space, where they auditioned other musicians. Josh Braun was recruited on the recommendation of Christensen, which subsequently led to the addition of Josh's twin brother Dan. Pudignano joined after answering an advertisement in the Village Voice.

The band's original name was "the Metal Envelope," which was scrapped in favor of "Circus Mort" (a contraction of "the Circus Morticians"), a name Dan Braun remembers suggesting. Oller stated that it felt appropriate given the "demented circus" sound of some of the band's music.

The band recorded the songs "Require Require" and "Working for Pleasure" at Sorcerer Sound Studios in late 1979, which led to the interest of promoter Jim Fouratt. He hired the band to play at the rock disco Hurrah in February 1980, opening for Snatch.

Pudignano left the band and was replaced by Mike Pedulla. The band played at various clubs around New York throughout 1980. Late that year, Pedulla announced that he was leaving the band, and Kane took his place. Shortly after, the band landed a recording contract with the newly formed Labor Records. They recorded demos of two songs, "Children Remember" and "Yellow Light," at Sorcerer Sound in preparation for a forthcoming EP. Producer Peter Ivers oversaw the recording of further tracks at Minot Sound in White Plains, New York.

Their first performance after the recording was opening for Bauhaus in February 1981. The band's final performance was in Boston, with the Neats, before disbanding shortly thereafter.

Gira, with Kane, went on to form Swans. Dan Braun joined Swans for a short period, playing live with them at CBGB, a recording of which was included on the compilation album Body to Body, Job to Job. Both Dan and Josh Braun were members of the Del-Byzanteens alongside Jim Jarmusch and Phil Kline, and later went on to form Deep Six with Kline and Oller. Kane went on to play with Rhys Chatham and La Monte Young. Gira later formed the Angels of Light, and was the founder of Young God Records.

== Discography ==
Circus Mort

EP by Circus Mort
- Released: 1981
- Recorded: December 18-21, 1980
- Studio: Minot Sound Studios, White Plains
- Genre: Post-punk; dance-punk; no wave
- Length: 13:52
- Label: Labor
- Producer: Peter Ivers

Side A
No.	Title	Length
1.	"Swallow You"	3:15
2.	"Children Remember"	3:34

Side B
No.	Title	Length
3.	"Yellow Light"	3:44
4.	"Watch the Puppet"	3:21
Total length:		13:52
