= A Taste of DNA =

EP by DNA
- Released: 1981
- Recorded: 1980 at Vanguard Studios, New York City, NY
- Genre: No wave
- Length: 9:48
- Label: American Clavé
- Producer: DNA

DNA chronology
A Taste of DNA (1981)	DNA (Last Live at CBGB's) (1993)

Professional ratings
Review scores
Source	Rating
Allmusic	4.5/5 stars
Robert Christgau	A−
The Rolling Stone Jazz Record Guide	1/5 stars
Spin Alternative Record Guide	8/10

A Taste of DNA is an EP by the no wave band DNA, released in 1981 through American Clavé. It was to be the band's last album to be released before they disbanded the following year.

== Track listing ==
All songs written by DNA

Side one
No.	Title	Length
1.	"New Fast"	1:13
2.	"5:30"	1:05
3.	"Blonde Red Head"	1:55

Side two
No.	Title	Length
1.	"32121"	0:53
2.	"New New"	2:49
3.	"Lying on the Sofa of Life"	1:53

== Personnel ==
DNA

- Arto Lindsay – guitar, vocals
- Ikue Mori – drums
- Tim Wright – bass guitar

Additional musicians and production

- Mark Berry – recording
- DNA – production
- Vlado Meller – mastering
