= Anna Marie Pyle =

American academic

- Education: Princeton University, Columbia University
- Scientific career
- Workplaces: Yale University, University of Colorado

Anna Marie Pyle is an American academic who is a Sterling Professor of Molecular, Cellular & Developmental Biology and a Professor of Chemistry at Yale University. and an Investigator for Howard Hughes Medical Institute. Pyle is the president of the RNA Society, the vice-chair of the Science and Technology Steering Committee at Brookhaven National Laboratory, and previously she served as chair of the Macromolecular Structure and Function A Study Section at the National Institutes of Health.

== Early life and education ==
Pyle grew up in Albuquerque, New Mexico, and it was there that she first became interested in science. It wasn't until after earning her bachelor's degree from Princeton University that she committed to a career in chemistry. In 1990, she graduated from Columbia University with a Ph.D. in chemistry. Pyle went on to postdoc at the University of Colorado until in 1992 she established a research group at Columbia University Medical Center in the Department of Biochemistry and Molecular Biophysics. In 2002, she moved to Yale University.

== Research ==
Pyle joined Yale University in 2002. She researches the architectural features of large RNA molecules and RNA remodeling enzymes using experimental biochemistry and crystallography. such as self-splicing introns and other noncoding RNAs. She has focused her research to understand how large RNAs assemble into specific, stable tertiary structures, and also how ATP-dependent enzymes in the cell recognize and remodel RNA. Specifically, she was successful in crystallizing and solving the structure of a group IIC intron from the bacterium Oceanobacillus iheyensis and moves through the stages of splicing. Pyle's research may be helpful in drug development as RNA's tertiary structure could provide insight into druggable biomolecules.

== Selected awards and honors ==
- 2023 Elected member of the U.S. National Academy of Sciences
- 2018 Appointed as Sterling Professor of Molecular, Cellular, and Developmental Biology
- 2007 Elected American Association for the Advancement of Science (AAAS) Fellow
- 2005 Appointed member of the American Academy of Arts and Sciences
