= The Del-Byzanteens =

1980s American band

Poster for a Del-Byzanteens performance at CBGB's

The Del-Byzanteens was a New York-based no wave band active in the early 1980s. The band comprised Phil Kline (vocals, guitar); Jim Jarmusch (vocals, keyboards); Philippe Hagen (bass); Josh Braun (percussion, drums); and Dan Braun (drums, percussion). Lucy Sante wrote lyrics to some of their songs, while Jamie Nares sometimes contributed as a percussionist, and occasionally John Lurie performed with them on stage. Josh and Dan Braun had previously been in Circus Mort with Michael Gira (later of Swans), and later went on to form Deep Six along with Phil Kline.

They released a 12" EP: Girl's Imagination (1981), an LP: Lies to Live By (1982), and a 7" single: Draft Riot (1982). In 1985-86 they recorded two more songs ("The Last Time" and "Fascination"), which were never finished or officially released.

"At that time everyone in New York had a band," Jarmusch recalled in an interview for The Washington Post (1984). "The idea was that you didn't have to be a virtuoso musician to have a band. The spirit was more important than having technical expertise, and that influenced a lot of filmmakers." According to Sante, they were "a band that insouciantly blended high and low, virtuosity and amateurism, calypso and science fiction, pots and pans and drones and the Supremes. They released several records, on a British label, which did very well in the former Yugoslavia."

They played a number of concerts at clubs such as CBGB, Hurrah and the Mudd Club in New York City. Two of their songs were featured in Wim Wenders' 1982 film The State of Things. At the time, Hot Press said that their debut LP was "a debut equal to anything out of New York these past six years", and Melody Maker described it as "mighty stuff... You are strongly urged to investigate this record... outstanding." Like the filmmaker Jim Jarmusch, many of its members have gone on to become famous in their own right, making music (Phil Kline), art (Jamie Nares), and writing (Sante).

Their back catalogue has never been re-issued on CD, and Del-Byzanteens vinyl is a rare sight on the second-hand market. However, "Girl's Imagination" was featured on the Beggars Banquet Records's 1999 compilation Pspyched!, and again on the Gomma compilation Anti-NY in 2001, while "My Hands Are Yellow (from the job that i do)" was released on New York Noise Vol 2, in 2003. Three of their shows at the Hurrah club were filmed, in their entirety, by Merrill Aldighieri. In early 2011 she released a 52-minute "hand-made" DVD, "Eskimo Lounge Music", featuring live footage from these performances, interfoiled with recent interviews with the band members.
