= RNA (journal) =

- Discipline: Biochemistry, molecular biology, RNA
- Language: English
- Edited by: Timothy W. Nilsen

Publication details
- History: 1995–present
- Publisher: Cold Spring Harbor Laboratory Press on behalf of the RNA Society (United States)
- Frequency: Monthly
- Open access: Delayed, after 12 months
- Impact factor: 3.949 (2018)

Standard abbreviations
- ISO 4: RNA

Indexing
- CODEN: RNARFU
- ISSN: 1355-8382 (print); 1469-9001 (web)
- LCCN: sn95038641
- OCLC no.: 807231080

Links
- Journal homepage; Online access; Online archive

RNA is a monthly peer-reviewed scientific journal that covers research on all aspects of RNA molecules, including their structures, metabolism, functions, and evolution. The journal was established in 1995 and originally published by Cambridge University Press. Since 2003 it is published by Cold Spring Harbor Laboratory Press on behalf of the RNA Society. The editor-in-chief is Timothy W. Nilsen (Case Western Reserve University).

== Abstracting and indexing ==
The journal is abstracted and indexed in Science Citation Index, Current Contents/Life Sciences, BIOSIS Previews, Scopus, and Index Medicus/MEDLINE/PubMed. According to the Journal Citation Reports, the journal has a 2018 impact factor of 3.949.
