= Mars (band) =

American rock band

- Self-titled Mars record cover

Background information
- Origin: New York, New York, United States
- Genres: No wave; experimental rock; avant-garde; noise rock
- Years active: 1975–1978
- Labels: Rebel Records; ZE Records; Widowspeak; Atavistic (reissues); G3G (reissues)
- Past members: Sumner Crane; Mark Cunningham; China Burg; Nancy Arlen; Rudolph Grey
- Website: markcunningham.cat

Mars were an American, New York City-based experimental noise rock band, formed in the no wave scene in 1975 when China Burg (née Constance Burg; a.k.a. Lucy Hamilton) (guitar, vocals) and artist Nancy Arlen (drums) brought Mark Cunningham (bass) and vocalist Sumner Crane together to talk about music. They were joined briefly by guitarist Rudolph Grey of Red Transistor. The band played one live show under the name China before changing it to Mars. In the course of their career, they pivoted from angular compositions to freeform noise music jams, consistently featuring absurd lyrics and non-standard drumming. All the members were said to be completely untrained in music before forming the band.

== History ==
Mars played Live about two dozen times, all in Manhattan. Their first show was at CBGB's in January 1977; their last one was at Max's Kansas City on December 10, 1978. Their recorded debut was the 3-E/ 11,000 Volts 7-inch single was recorded and mixed by Jay Dee Daugherty and Brooke Delarco under the direction of Lenny Kaye and later released by Rebel Records/ ZE Records. The group then released a single live EP in 1979 or 1980, though they had broken up in 1978. Both recordings were compiled by Lydia Lunch's self-run label, Widowspeak Records, in 1986, as 78; the songs were remastered and remixed by Jim Thirlwell (a.k.a. Foetus). It was reissued by Atavistic Records on CD in 1996 as 78+.

In 1978, Mars appeared on the influential No New York compilation LP produced by Brian Eno, along with DNA, Teenage Jesus and the Jerks, and James Chance and the Contortions, which helped to bring the nascent No Wave genre into the foreground. An All Music reviewer wrote of their contributions: "Mars creates interesting music out of apparent chaos; the vocals are babbled and the guitars, bass and drums sound like they're weaving in and out of the song while going in several different directions at once, yet the band is oddly compelling in its crazed, cacophonous way."

=== Post-breakup ===
In 1985, China Burg collaborated with Lunch on the album The Drowning of Lucy Hamilton.

Due to complaints about Thirlwell's modifications on 78/78+, the full studio recordings of Mars (totaling about 30 minutes) surfaced in 2003 on the Spanish labels G3G and Spookysound. Cunningham ran both Hyrax Records and Spookysound Records. (To clarify: 78, 78+, and Mars LP: The Complete Studio Recordings, NYC 1977–1978 all feature essentially the same half-hour batch of music, but with very slight auditory differences.) After the breakup of Mars, Cunningham was part of the bizarre John Gavanti "no wave opera" project with Crane, Arto Lindsay, and others. He has also worked with the band Don King, and with his current outfit, Convolution. The MARS EP, on Charles Ball’s Lust/Unlust label, was recorded in December 1978 in one live session and was the last time the band played together. The songs included on the EP were: N.N. End, Scorn, Outside Africa, Monopoly and Immediate Stages of the Erotic.

Crane died of lymphoma on April 15, 2003. Arlen died on September 17, 2006, following heart surgery.

== Legacy ==
Mars was featured in 2023 at the Centre Pompidou in a Nicolas Ballet curated no wave exhibition entitled Who You Staring At: Culture visuelle de la scène no wave des années 1970 et 1980 (Visual culture of the no wave scene in the 1970s and 1980s).

== Discography ==
- "3-E" (b/w "11,000 Volts") – 7", 1978 (Rebel Records, RB 7802) (later released as a 12" on ZE)
- No New York – LP, 1978 (Antilles/ Island) (split compilation with three other bands)
- Mars – 12" EP (live), 1979 or 1980 (Lust/Unlust/Infidelity)
- 78 – LP, 1986 (Widowspeak)
- Live Mars 77–78 – CD, 1995 (DSA) (France)
- 78+ – CD, 1996 (Atavistic)
- Mars LP: The Complete Studio Recordings, NYC 1977–1978 – CD, 2003 (G3G/Spookysound) (Spain; limited edition) (later released on LP by Important) (reissued by No More in 2008)
- Live at Artists Space – LP (live), 2011 (recorded May 6, 1978) (Feeding Tube/Negative Glam)
- Live at Irving Plaza – LP (live), 2012 (recorded August 4, 1978) (Feeding Tube/Negative Glam)
- Rehearsal Tapes and Alt-Takes NYC 1976–1978 – 3-cassette box set, 2012 (recorded between Summer of 1976 and November 1978) (Anòmia; limited edition)
