= DNA (Last Live at CBGB's) =

Live album by DNA
- Released: 1993
- Recorded: June 25, 1982
- Venue: CBGB's, New York City
- Genre: No wave
- Length: 29:08
- Label: Avant
- Producer: DNA

DNA chronology
A Taste of DNA (1981)	DNA (Last Live at CBGB's) (1993)	DNA on DNA (2004)

Professional ratings
Review scores
Source	Rating
AllMusic	3/5 stars

DNA (Last Live at CBGB's) is a live album by DNA, released in 1993 through Avant Records.

== Track listing ==
All lyrics are written by Arto Lindsay, except "Calling to Phone" by Ikue Mori; all music is composed by DNA.

No.	Title	Length
1.	"Newest Fastest"	1:37
2.	"5:30"	1:12
3.	"Detach"	1:35
4.	"New New"	3:11
5.	"32123"	1:13
6.	"Brand New"	3:16
7.	"Horse"	3:13
8.	"Forgery"	1:01
9.	"New Fast"	1:16
10.	"Blonde Red Head"	1:50
11.	"Action"	1:08
12.	"Marshall"	2:11
13.	"Lying on the Sofa of Life"	2:14
14.	"New Low"	1:47
15.	"Calling to Phone"	2:24

== Personnel ==
DNA

- Arto Lindsay – guitar, vocals
- Ikue Mori – drums
- Tim Wright – bass guitar

Production and additional personnel

- Patrick Dillett – mixing
- DNA – production
- Scott Hull – engineering
- John Kilgore – recording
- Howie Weinberg – mastering
