= Yony Leyser =

American film director (born 1985)

Yony Leyser (born 1985) is a director and writer based in Berlin.

== Biography ==
=== Early life and education ===
Yony Leyser was born in DeKalb, Illinois in 1985 to an Israeli-Iranian mother and a German Jewish father.

Leyser studied at the California Institute of the Arts and at the University of Kansas before graduating with a B.A from The New School in New York City, where he majored in film and journalism, and an MFA from the Academy of Media Arts Cologne.

In 2010, Leyser relocated to Berlin.

=== Career ===
After five years in the making, Leyser independently released his first feature film, William S. Burroughs: A Man Within, a documentary film covering William S. Burroughs in 2010. The film features archival footage, some of which was previously unreleased, as well as interviews with Burrough's friends and colleagues. The film received was received positively, with a 88% rating on Rotten Tomatoes. The film was a Critic's Pick of The New York Times and received positive reviews from the Los Angeles Times, and Variety. It was an official selection at multiple international film festivals including the International Documentary Film Festival Amsterdam and Vienna International Film Festival.

In 2015, Leyser released his second feature film, Desire Will Set You Free. Rooted in the director's actual experiences, the film follows an American writer of Palestinian and Israeli descent and a Russian escort as they navigate the Berlin's underground queer scene. The film was the centerpiece of that year's San Francisco Independent Film Festival.

In 2017, Leyser released Queercore: How to Punk a Revolution, a feature-length documentary about the cultural/social movement known as queercore. The film focuses on queercore zine culture, music, cinema, and activism. It debuted at Sheffield DocFest and was acquired by French network Arte and by Germany's ZDF. Leyser also co-wrote a book of the same name, released by PM Press in 2021.

In 2022, Drag Me to the USA was released. The docuseries directed by Leyser follows three German drag queens as they embark on road trip from New Orleans to Los Angeles. It was commissioned and released by RTL+.

In addition to his feature films, Leyser has written and directed a number of theater productions including W(a)rm Holes, which was shown at Maxim Gorki Theater in Berlin.

Leyser has also contributed to publications including Vice.

== Filmography ==
Year	Title	Ref.	Notes
2010	William S. Burroughs: A Man Within		-
2015	Desire Will Set You Free		-
2017	Queercore: How to Punk a Revolution		-
2022	Drag Me to the USA		Docuseries
