= Genome Research =

Genomics academic journal

- Discipline: Genetics, genomics
- Language: English
- Edited by: Hillary Sussman

Publication details
- Former names: PCR Methods and Applications
- History: 1991–present
- Publisher: Cold Spring Harbor Laboratory Press (United States)
- Frequency: Monthly
- Open access: Delayed (after 6 months)
- Impact factor: 5.4 (2024)

Standard abbreviations
- ISO 4: Genome Res.

Indexing
- CODEN: GEREFS
- ISSN: 1088-9051 (print); 1549-5469 (web)
- LCCN: sn95029259
- OCLC no.: 33123409

Links
- Journal homepage; Online access; Online archive

Genome Research is a peer-reviewed scientific journal published by Cold Spring Harbor Laboratory Press. The journal scope covers genome biology, including genome structure, function and evolution, comparative genomics, molecular evolution, genome-scale quantitative and population genetics, proteomics, epigenomics, and systems biology, genomic medicine, and single-cell analysis. New data in these areas are published as research papers, or methods and resource reports that provide novel information on technologies or tools that will be of interest to a broad readership. The journal was established in 1991 as PCR Methods and Applications and obtained its current title in 1995. According to the Journal Citation Reports, the journal has a 2024 impact factor of 5.4.

The journal was established in 1991 as PCR Methods and Applications and was renamed Genome Research in 1995.
