= Corporate DNA =

Factors underlying and affecting organizational culture

Corporate DNA refers, in business jargon, to organizational culture. It is a metaphor based on the biological term DNA, the molecule that encodes the genetic instructions in living organisms.

In a 1997 book, Gareth Morgan defined the corporate DNA metaphor as the "visions, values, and sense of purpose that bind an organization together" to enable individuals to "understand and absorb the mission and challenge of the whole enterprise". Lindgreen and Swaen define it as an "organization's culture and strategy". Ken Baskin defines it as "flexible, universally available database of company procedures and structures" which develops from the company's history, and that the organization's employees behave to satisfy the resultant corporate identity. Baskin also likens the availability of information throughout an organization to the presence of DNA in all of an organism's cells. Arnold Kransdorff defines corporate DNA as the set of institution-specific experiences that "characterizes any organization's ability to perform".

== Definition ==
In a Strategy+Business article, Gary Neilson, Bruce A. Pasternack, and Decio Mendes state that the four DNA bases for an organization are its structure, decision rights, motivating factors, and information. In the book DNA Profiling : The Innovative Company: How to Increase Creative Ability in Business, Isabelle Denervaud and Olivier Chatin state that the four organizational bases are actors, ideation, emotion, and collaboration. Denervaud and Chatin also extend the metaphor by identifying factors that may mutate organizational DNA (discontinuity, traditional playing fields, new lands, and individuals), much like a genetic mutation may change the nucleotide sequence of the genome of an organism, and Neilson, Pasternack, and Mendes describe a company adapting to structural and environmental changes analogous to biological adaptation. The term DNA is also used to describe an organization's ability to innovate.

In Corporate Culture: The Ultimate Strategic Asset, Eric Flamholtz and Yvonne Randle state that organization culture is "transmitted to generations of employees" via that organization's DNA, and that the DNA of the culture of the company is established "during its initial stages" reflecting the "personal and professional values" of the founders. They also state that it can be "transformed through the entrance of new people with new ideas", and that significant differences in organizational performance can be derived from small changes in organizational DNA. According to Virginia Healy-Tangney, such changes must come throughout the organization and are time-consuming. These changes may result in increased productivity and profitability, and in a reduction of employee turnover.

Preservation of organizational DNA is important to ensure business continuity and persistence. Organizations have implemented various techniques to prevent organizational DNA from being controlled by external influences, such as Mars, Incorporated remaining privately owned to limit control of share capital. Another method is by branding corporate work environments to "clearly reflect the culture" of the organization.

DNA is used to describe the skills, properties, or qualities of an individual that describe that individual's character.

The term is also used to describe the set of architectural and spatial characteristics considered by the inhabitants of a city to be constituents of that city's identity. This may include "materials and colours, a typical arrangement of scale and architectural forms, building lot size, roof lines, scale of public and semi-public spaces" which should be respected by new buildings and urban spaces in the city. In an article in Fast Company, Kelli Richards claims that the organizational culture at Apple Inc. in the 1990s has become part of the DNA of Silicon Valley.
