= Cold Spring Harbor Laboratory Press =

American academic publisher

- Parent company: Cold Spring Harbor Laboratory
- Status: Active
- Country of origin: United States
- Headquarters location: Cold Spring Harbor, New York
- Distribution: Oxford University Press
- Nonfiction topics: Biology
- Official website: www.cshlpress.com

Cold Spring Harbor Laboratory Press was founded in 1933 to aid in Cold Spring Harbor Laboratory's purpose of furthering the advance and spread of scientific knowledge.

CSHL Press publishes monographs, technical manuals, handbooks, review volumes, conference proceedings, scholarly journals and videotapes. These examine important topics in molecular biology, genetics, development, virology, neurobiology, immunology and cancer biology. Manuscripts for books and for journal publication are invited from scientists worldwide.

Revenue from sales of CSHL Press publications is used solely in support of research at Cold Spring Harbor Laboratory.

== Journals ==
Scientific journals published by CSHL Press:

- Cold Spring Harbor Molecular Case Studies
- Cold Spring Harbor Perspectives in Biology
- Cold Spring Harbor Perspectives in Medicine
- Cold Spring Harbor Protocols
- Cold Spring Harbor Symposia on Quantitative Biology
- Genes & Development
- Genome Research
- Learning & Memory
- Life Science Alliance
- RNA

== Monographs ==
The Cold Spring Harbor Press monograph series is a series of advanced comprehensive volumes giving the state of the art on the most important model organisms and systems for research in molecular biology. The series began in 1970 with The Lactose Operon edited by David Zipser and Jonathan Beckwith OCLC 67611756.

== Operation centers ==
CSHL Press has two operation centers. The main office is located in Woodbury, New York, near Cold Spring Harbor Laboratory, where editorial, marketing & advertising, composition, and fulfillment & distribution functions are performed. An additional book fulfillment & distribution operation is handled by NBN International in Plymouth, United Kingdom. Its current executive director is John R. Inglis.
