= Robin Crutchfield =

Background information
- Born: Robin Lee Crutchfield; September 8, 1952 (age 73); Dayton, Ohio, United States
- Genres: No wave, electronic, psychedelic folk
- Occupations: Artist, musician, writer
- Instruments: Keyboards, harp
- Years active: 1977–present
- Labels: Lust/Unlust; Plexus; Nigh Eve; Daft; Hand/Eye; Important
- Website: Robin Crutchfield Bio

Robin Lee Crutchfield (born September 8, 1952) is an American artist. He is best known as one of the founding musicians of the former New York No Wave scene. He has performed at such hallowed musical grounds as Tier 3, CBGB's, Max's Kansas City and Artists Space; as well as had his work on display at prestigious venues like MoMA and The Whitney Museum of American Art.

== Biography ==
Born in Ohio, Robin moved to New York in the mid-1970s. He was a performance artist in the SoHo and Tribeca art scene before becoming an original member of the seminal No Wave band DNA alongside Arto Lindsay and Ikue Mori. He played keyboards in the first version of the band, getting to work with musical luminary Brian Eno on the seminal No New York album. Robin left the band to form his own group in 1979. His band, Dark Day, explored wide varieties of keyboard and synthesizer textures and went through several lineup changes. Early on Robin worked with Nina Canal of Ut, and Nancy Arlen of Mars. Towards the end of the band's existence Crutchfield, now working solo, explored a style somewhat reminiscent of European medieval and baroque music.

In 1978 Robin dabbled in acting, taking a small part in cult New York film director Amos Poe's The Foreigner. As well as acting, Crutchfield, true to the DIY attitude of the punk movement, created his own record label, Nigh Eve, on which he released many of his albums.

Crutchfield resumed Dark Day as a solo act in the late 1990s, returning to a familiar electronic sound but with a noticeable natural progression. The albums that followed saw his music turn away from the cold synthesizer textures he'd become known for. In the year 2000 Robin's music was used in the Bravo television series First Person created by Errol Morris.

In early 2002, after a twenty-year hiatus, Crutchfield resumed both painting and writing. His work centered around fairy tales and his music changed to reflect this. By the summer of that same year Crutchfield had exhibited both his new images and words at a gallery show curated by Norman Shapiro at the Leslie-Lohman Gay Art Foundation entitled Verbal/Visual/Tactile: Book Artist's Show.

In 2008, Marc Masters, a contributing writer for The Wire magazine, published his book entitled No Wave. The book, as its name implies, focuses solely on the No Wave scene and features many sections on both DNA and Dark Day, as well as performance and promotional photographs of Crutchfield from that time period. Robin is also featured in Simon Reynolds post-punk opus Rip It Up and Start Again.

As of 2009, Robin has worked with noted independent label Important Records to release his fourth CD of harp/drone folk music entitled The Hidden Folk, which has received rave reviews from both critics and fellow contemporaries such as Kurt Weisman, and Thurston Moore. In late 2009 Crutchfield decided to enter the publishing world with a short book entitled Eleven Faerie Tales. Expanding his world of faeries from music into the written word, Robin used the creation of these fairy tales as a kind of therapy, to best express the emotions he had felt dealing with particularly difficult relationships or friendships over the years. These eleven tales deal with what it means to be a person, living through all the ups and downs of love, while trying to get to the very heart of what makes up our lives. Robin still lives in New York City and continues to create and be involved with the art world, most recently guest deejaying for Ceci Moss on East Village Radio. In the summer of 2015 Robin Crutchfield released the album into the Dark Wood, masterfully exploring the ethereal soundscapes that continue to drive his recordings.

2017 saw Robin releasing a book of his artwork entitled A Few Lines – The Art of Robin Lee Crutchfield. The book contains Robin's original work in line drawings, watercolors, and portraits. Robin has said of this work, "As an artist, and musician, I have always favored results through an economy of means. A few notes in relation to one another, a few lines on a page. My favorite works are ones which manage to convey a great deal through very little; a few notes that respect silence, a few lines that revere the empty page. I feel they help us see ourselves in relation to the vastness of the universe.”

Starting in the Spring of 2017, Crutchfield began hosting radio specials on the Luxuria Music network. This turned into a weekly Internet radio program in the fall of the same year. Robin Crutchfield's Dark Day Escape Pod finds the artist curating a variety of music that he describes as a "road trip hopscotching across time and space from the morass of the morose to the cheerful earful, melodies from the mellow to the melodramatic, the sophomoric to the simply silly." Dark Day Escape Pod can be heard every Monday night from 11 pm – 1am EST on

In 2019, Robin's love of Tarot cards lead him to create Youtube Channel Toadstool Tarot, dedicated to reviewing tarot decks new and old. His renewed interest in Tarot led him to create his own tarot deck, The Open Face Tarot, for which he created the artwork. This minimalist, Major Arcana only deck, can be found through publisher MPC. It was favorably received by respected Tarot reviewer site Hermit's Cave in 2020.

== Discography ==
With DNA

- You & You" b/w "Little Ants 1978 – Lust/Unlust Music
- No New York: various artists (Four DNA tracks), 1978 – Antilles
- DNA on DNA, 2004 – No More Records

As Dark Day

- "Hands in the Dark" b/w "Invisible Man", 1979 – Lust/Unlust Music
- Exterminating Angel, 1980 – Lust/Unlust Music
- Trapped b/w The Exterminations 1–6 1981 – Lust/Unlust Music
- Window, 1982 – Plexus USA
- Darkest Before Dawn, 1989 – Nigh Eve Productions
- Dark Day Collected: 1978–1982, 1998 – Daft Records
- trange Clockwork, 1999 – Self-released
- Loon, 2000 – Self-released
- Robin Crutchfield reading from the White Things, 2001 – Self-released
- The Happy Little Oysters, 2001 – Self-released
- Fifty: A Half-Life, 2002 – Self-released
- Dark Day: Strange Clockwork, 2003 – Nigh Eve Recordings
- Strange Remains, 2005 – Self-released

As Robin Crutchfield

- SongsForFaerieFolk, 2006 – Self-released
- ToadstoolSoup, 2006 – Nigh Eve Recordings
- For Our Friends in the Enchanted Otherworld, 2007 – Hand/Eye
- The Hidden Folk, 2009 – Important Records
- Into the Dark Wood, 2015 – Nigh Eve Recordings

== Bibliography ==
- Eleven Faerie Tales, 2009 – Nigh Eve Publications
- A Few Lines, 2017 – Nigh Eve Publications
