= DNA (American band) =

American no wave band

Background information
- Origin: New York City, New York, U.S.
- Genres: No wave, post-punk
- Years active: 1977–1982
- Labels: Antilles, Avant
- Past members: Arto Lindsay; Robin Crutchfield; Gordon Stevenson; Mirielle Cervenka; Ikue Mori; Tim Wright; Gordon Stevenson; Mary Kathryn Cervenka

DNA was an American no wave band formed in 1977 by guitarist Arto Lindsay and keyboardist Robin Crutchfield, and later joined by drummer Ikue Mori and bassist Tim Wright. They were associated with the late-1970s New York City no wave music and art scene, and were featured on the 1978 compilation No New York.

== History ==
DNA originally consisted of Lindsay, Crutchfield, Gordon Stevenson and Mirielle Cervenka, and took their name from a song by another no wave band, Mars. Stevenson went on to play bass for Teenage Jesus and the Jerks; Cervenka was the older sister of Exene Cervenka of X. Terry Ork, head of Ork Records, booked the band at Max's Kansas City for its first show. Cervenka and Stevenson left after hearing this. Lindsay and Crutchfield hastily recruited Ikue Mori—who at the time had little command of English and no musical experience—to be DNA's drummer.

This lineup of DNA played occasionally at Tier 3, CBGB and Max's Kansas City and recorded one 7" single. Within their first year, they had cemented their reputation as a paradigmatic no wave band when Brian Eno selected them as one of the four groups documented on the No New York LP, the first recording to expose no wave groups to an audience outside of Lower Manhattan. The other three bands appearing on this album were The Contortions, Teenage Jesus and the Jerks, and Mars.

Shortly after the recording of No New York, Crutchfield left DNA to form a new band, Dark Day. He was replaced by Tim Wright, previously of the Cleveland band Pere Ubu. As Wright played bass guitar and not keyboards and was the only member of the band to have any conventional instrumental technique, the change in DNA's sound was dramatic. The music became even more spare and angular, with Wright's bass lines creating a sometimes menacing sound to support Lindsay's scraping, atonal guitar and Mori's irregular rhythms. Their song structures became tighter, briefer, more abstract, and have been compared to haiku.

The Lindsay-Mori-Wright lineup of DNA developed something of a cult following between 1979 and 1982, but perhaps more of their fans came from the art world than from rock audiences. Live shows were frequent in this period, but rarely outside of the CBGB/Mudd Club/Tier 3 circuit in lower Manhattan.

The group's 10-minute debut album, A Taste of DNA was recorded for Kip Hanrahan's American Clavé label, and was later released on Rough Trade in 1980. Some live DNA tracks appeared on compilation albums while the band was still in existence.

Lindsay, Mori, and Wright decided to dissolve the band in 1982. Its final concerts were three consecutive sold-out nights at CBGB. DNA's final encore was a cover of Led Zeppelin's "Whole Lotta Love". This is not included on the CD Last Live at CBGB, released more than a decade later, on John Zorn's Avant label.

Lindsay and Mori, and to a lesser extent Crutchfield, have remained active in music.

DNA on DNA, a comprehensive CD chronicle of the band, was released by No More Records in 2004.

== In popular culture ==
The band is featured in the film Downtown 81 starring Jean-Michel Basquiat.

The rock group Blonde Redhead takes its name from a DNA song.

== Discography ==
=== Live albums ===
- DNA (Last Live at CBGB's) (1993), Avant (Japan), Avant 006 (CD)

=== Compilation albums ===
- DNA on DNA (2004), No More Records, NoCD12

=== Collaboration ===
- John Gavanti (1980)

=== EPs ===
- A Taste of DNA (1981), American Clavé, AMCL 1003EP (12")

=== Singles ===
- "You & You" b/w "Little Ants" (1978), Lust/Unlust Music, 11-CAN-234

=== Compilation appearances ===
- No New York: various artists (four DNA tracks) (1978), Antilles, AN 7067 (LP)
- The Fruit of Original Sin: various artists (three DNA tracks) (1981), Les Disques Du Crepuscule, twi 035 (2xLP)
- American Clavé Sampler: various artists (one DNA track) (1993), American Clave (USA), AMCL 1020/1026 (2xCD)
